= Édouard Didron =

French stained glass artist and art writer

- Born: 13 October 1836; Paris
- Died: 14 April 1902 (aged 65); Paris
- Occupation: Stained glass artist
- Parent(s): Mr Fiot; Ms Didron
- Relatives: Adolphe Napoléon Didron (uncle)

Édouard Didron (1836-1902) was a French stained glass artist and art writer.

== Biography ==
=== Early life ===
Édouard Amedée Didron was born on 13 October 1836 in Paris. His father was Mr Fiot and his mother, Ms Didron. His uncle, the archeologist and art historian Adolphe Napoléon Didron (1806-1867), adopted him.

=== Career ===
He designed the stained glass in the Église Saint-Vincent-de-Paul in Marseille. He also designed stained glass in the Église Sainte-Rosalie in Paris, the Église Saint-Christophe in Cergy, the Église Saint-Ouen in Le Tronquay, the Église Notre-Dame in Neufchâtel-en-Bray, the Cathédrale Saint-Maclou de Pontoise in Pontoise, the Basilica of St. Sernin in Toulouse, the Eglise Notre Dame de Carentan and the Cathédrale Saint-Front de Périgueux in Périgueux.

Additionally, he wrote many books about art. He denounced the "bastardization" of Gothic art, which meant the decoration of bars and private residences with medieval and mock-medieval works. He was also the editor of Annales Archéologiques from 1867 to 1872.

=== Death ===
He died on 14 April 1902 in Paris.

== List of Works ==
France

- Église Saint-Vincent-de-Paul, Marseille, Bouches-du-Rhône
- Cathedrale Saint-Front, Périgueux, Dordogne
- Eglise Saint-Ouen, Le Tronquay, Eure
- Basilica de Saint-Sernin, Toulouse, Haute-Garonne
- Sainte-Roslie, Paris, Île-de-France
- Eglise Notre-Dame, Neufchâtel-en-Bray, Seine-Maritime
- Saint-Christophe Church, Créteil, Val-de-Marne
- Cathedrale Saint-Maclou, Pontoise, Val-d'Oise
- Église Saint Germain des Prés, Paris : dated 1894, in the chapel Saint Joseph in the ambulatory

United Kingdom

- St. Mary's Church, Feltwell, Norfolk

== Bibliography ==
- Nicolas-Marie-Joseph Chapuy, Édouard Didron, Allemagne monumentale et pittoresque: ou ses vues et ses monuments (accompagnés de notes historiques) (Goupil & Vibert, 1845).
- Édouard Didron, Vitraux du Grand-Andely, (Librairie archéologique de Victor Didron, 1863).
- Édouard Didron, Les vitraux à l'expossition universelle de 1867 (Librairie archéologique de Victor Didron, 1868).
- Édouard Didron, Quelques Mots sur l'Art Chrétien à propos de l'Image du Sacré-Cœur (1874).
- Édouard Didron, Louis Clémandot, Exposition Universelle Internationale de 1878 À Paris. Groupe III. Classe 19. Rapport Sur Les Cristaux, la Verrerie, Et Les Vitraux. (1880).
- Édouard Didron, Catalogue de la bibliothèque iconographique et archéologique de feu (Emile-Paul, 1903, 87 pages).

== Gallery ==
Édouard Didron
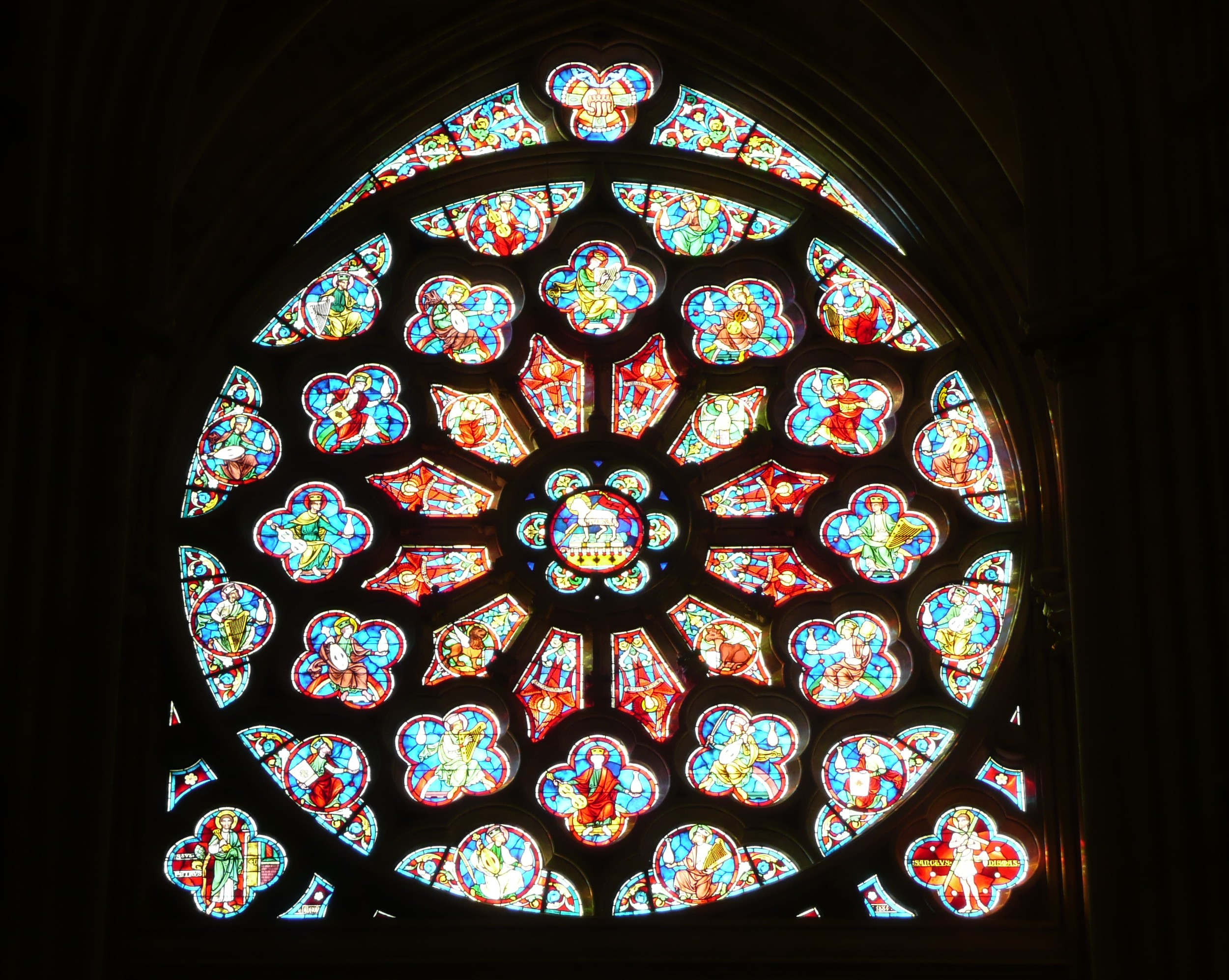
Stained glass inside the Église Saint-Vincent-de-Paul in Marseille

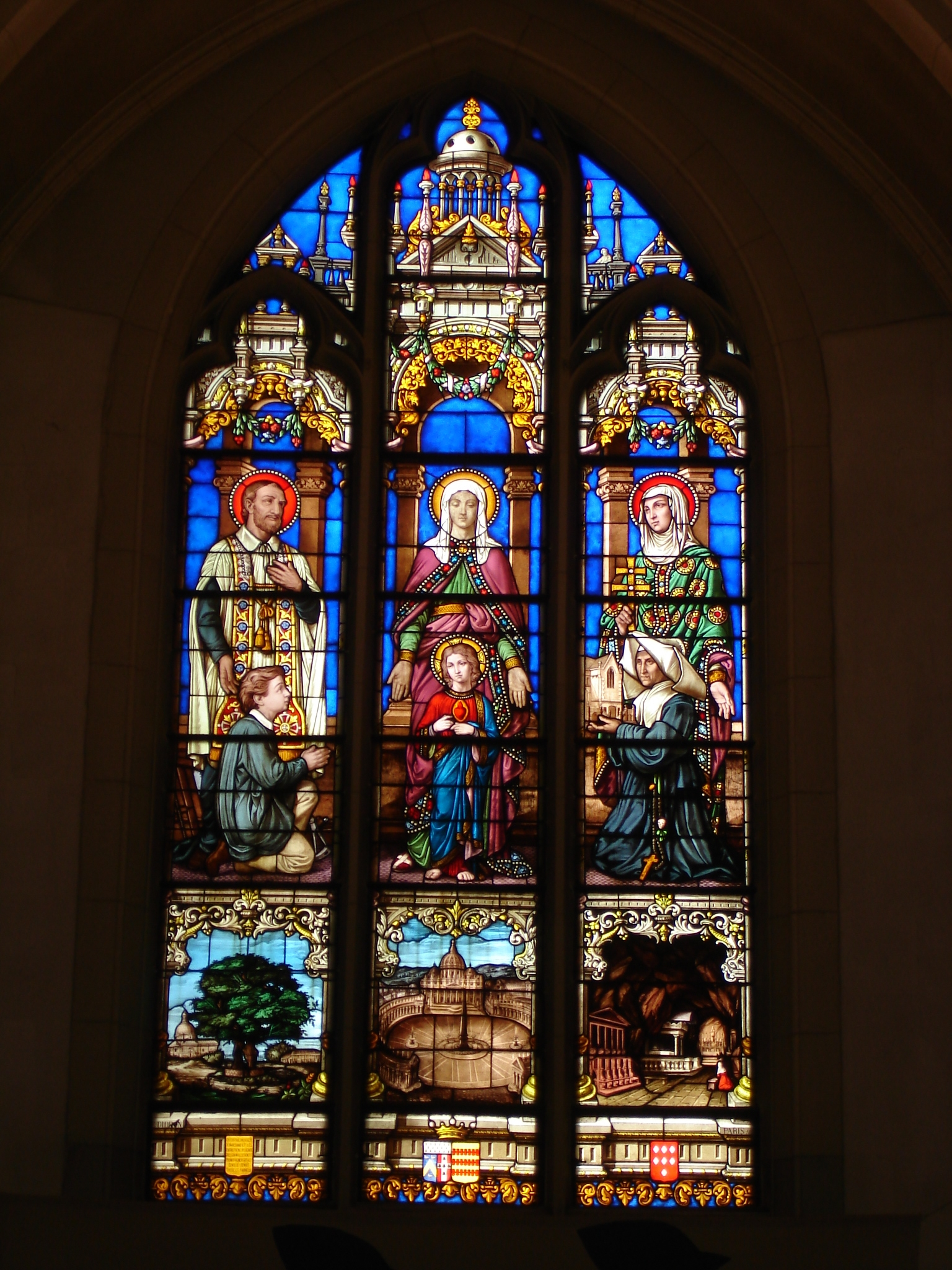
Stained glass inside the Église Sainte-Rosalie in Paris

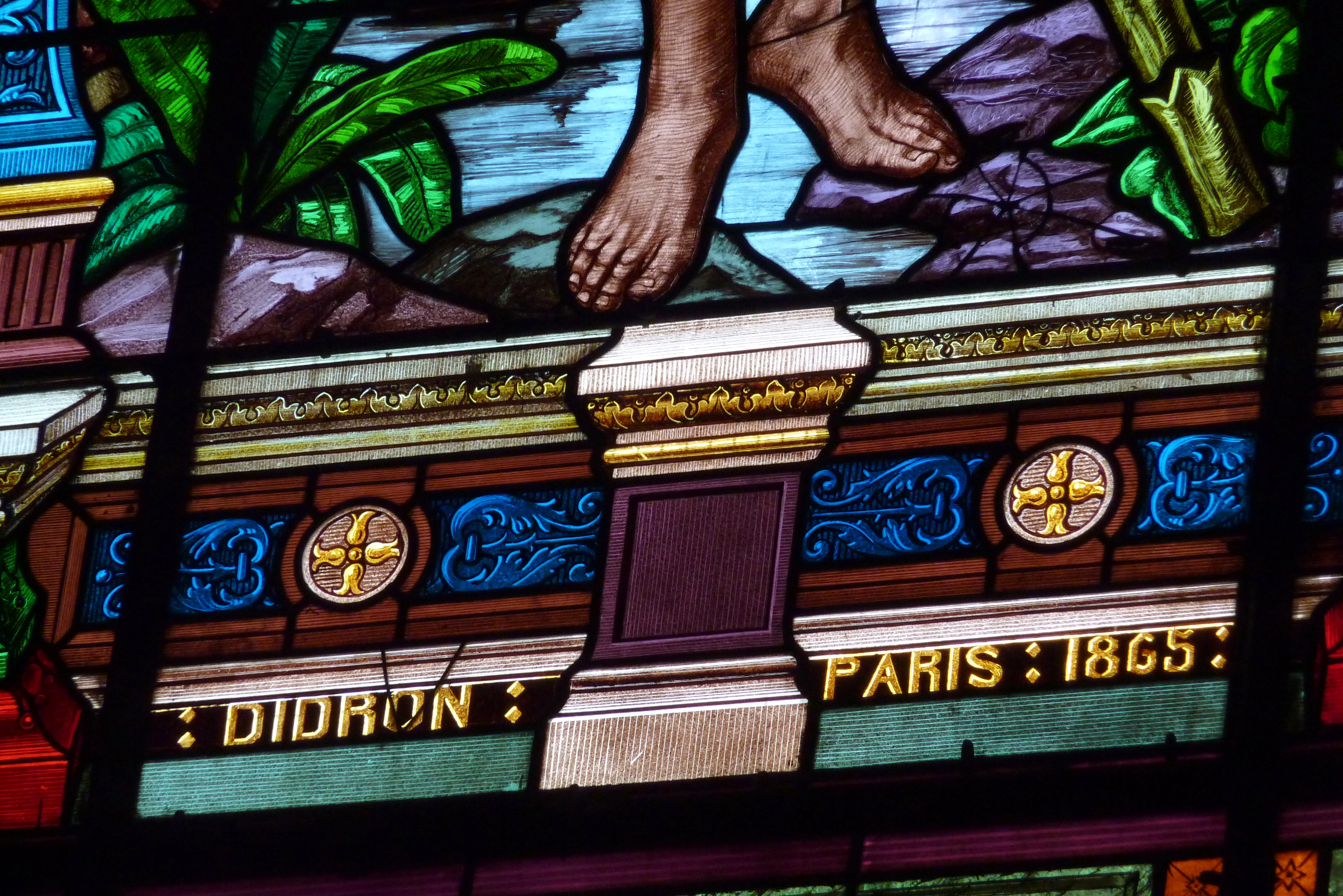
Stained glass inside the Église Saint-Christophe in Cergy

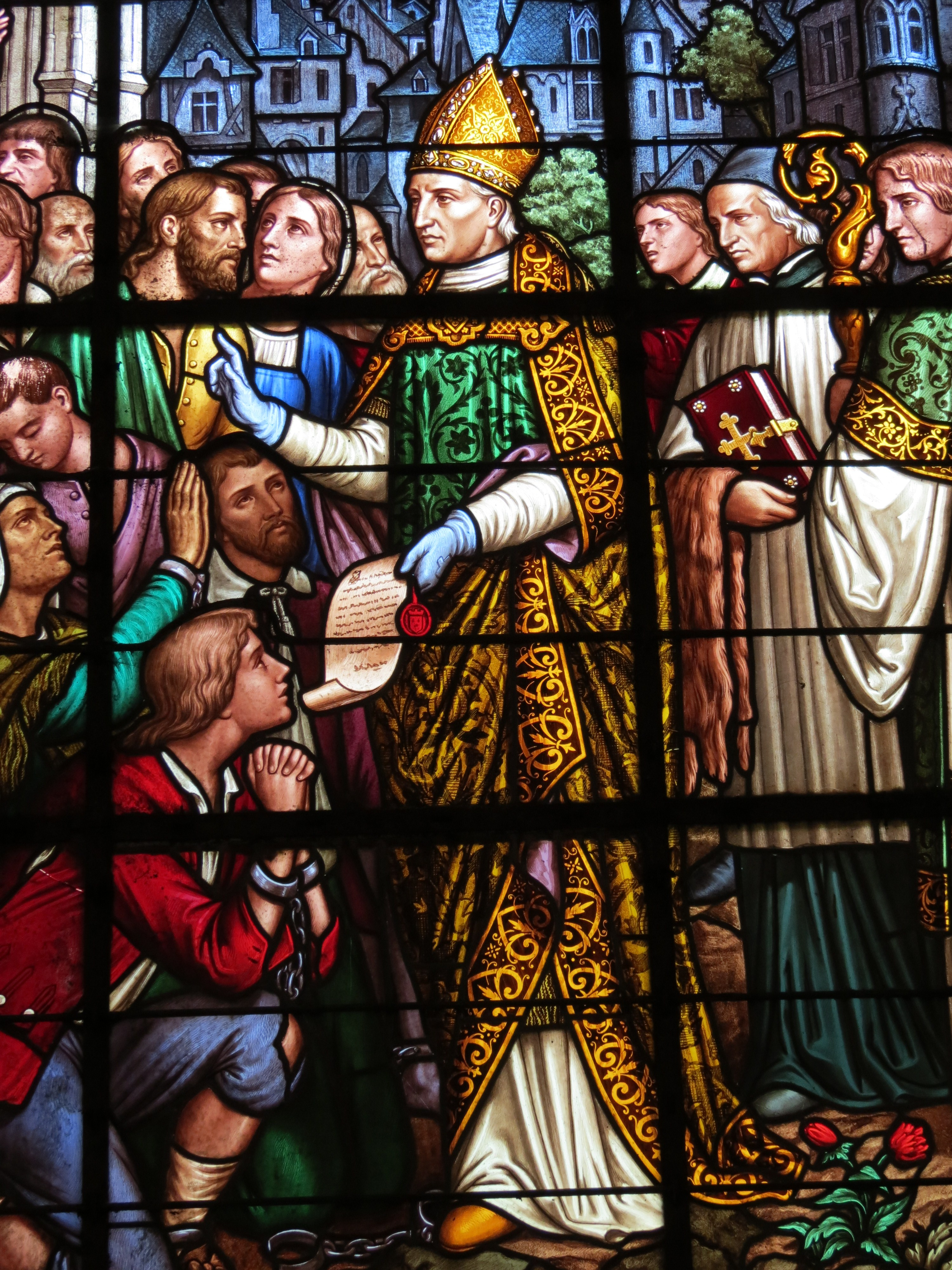
Stained glass representing Archbishop François de Harlay inside the Église Saint-Ouen in Le Tronquay

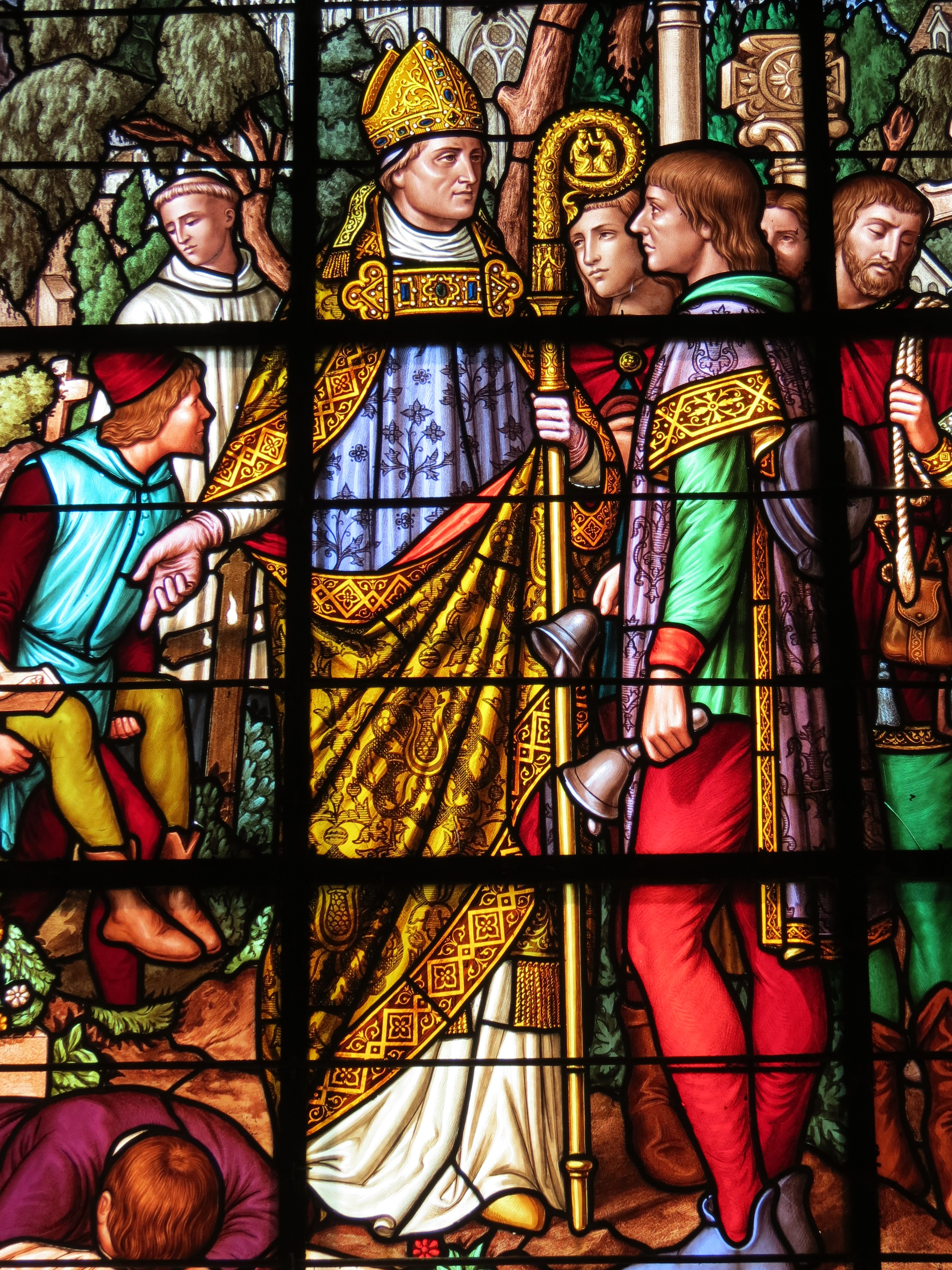
Stained glass representing Archbishop Jean de Marigny inside the Église Saint-Ouen in Le Tronquay

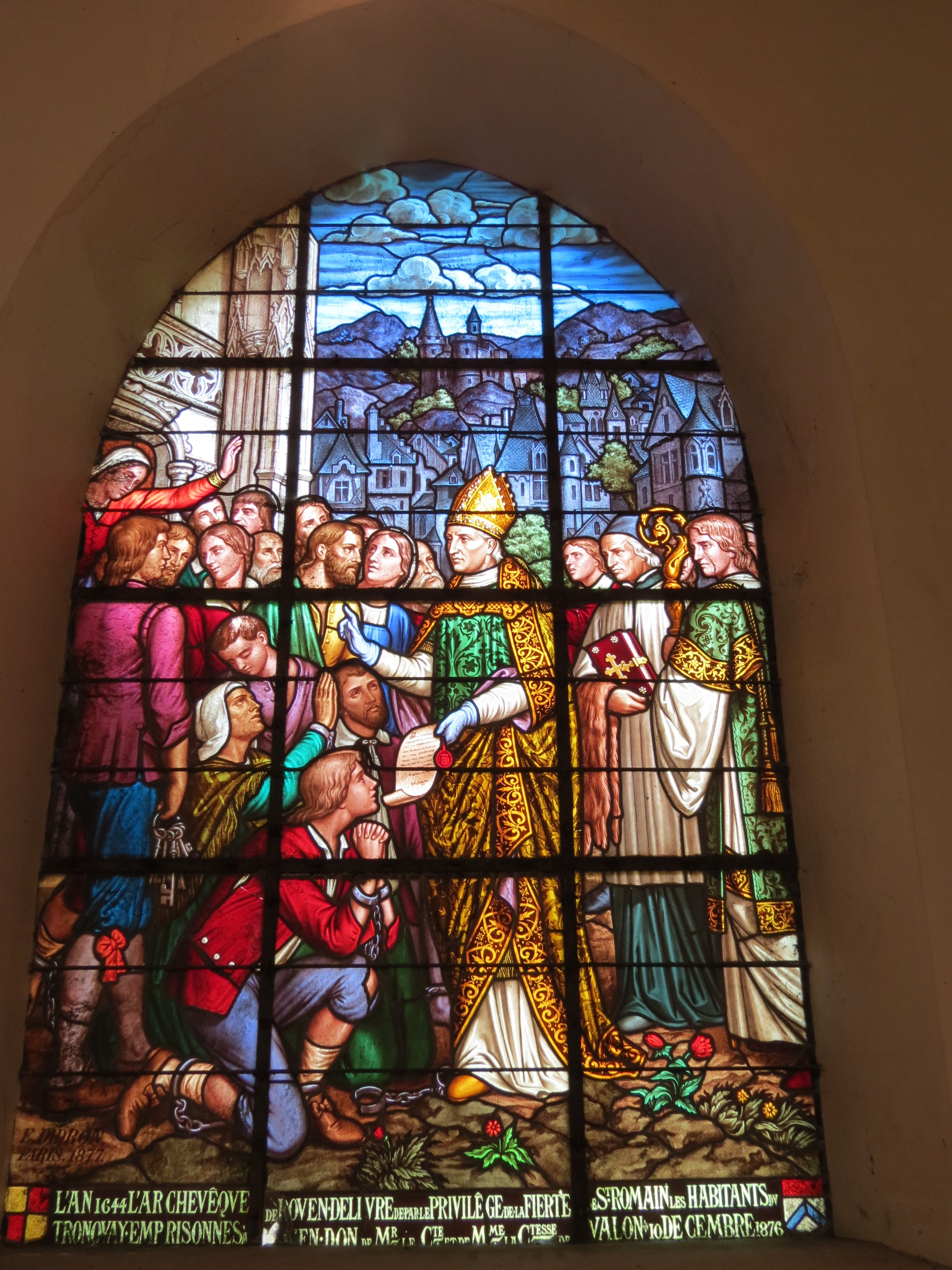
Stained glass inside the Église Saint-Ouen in Le Tronquay

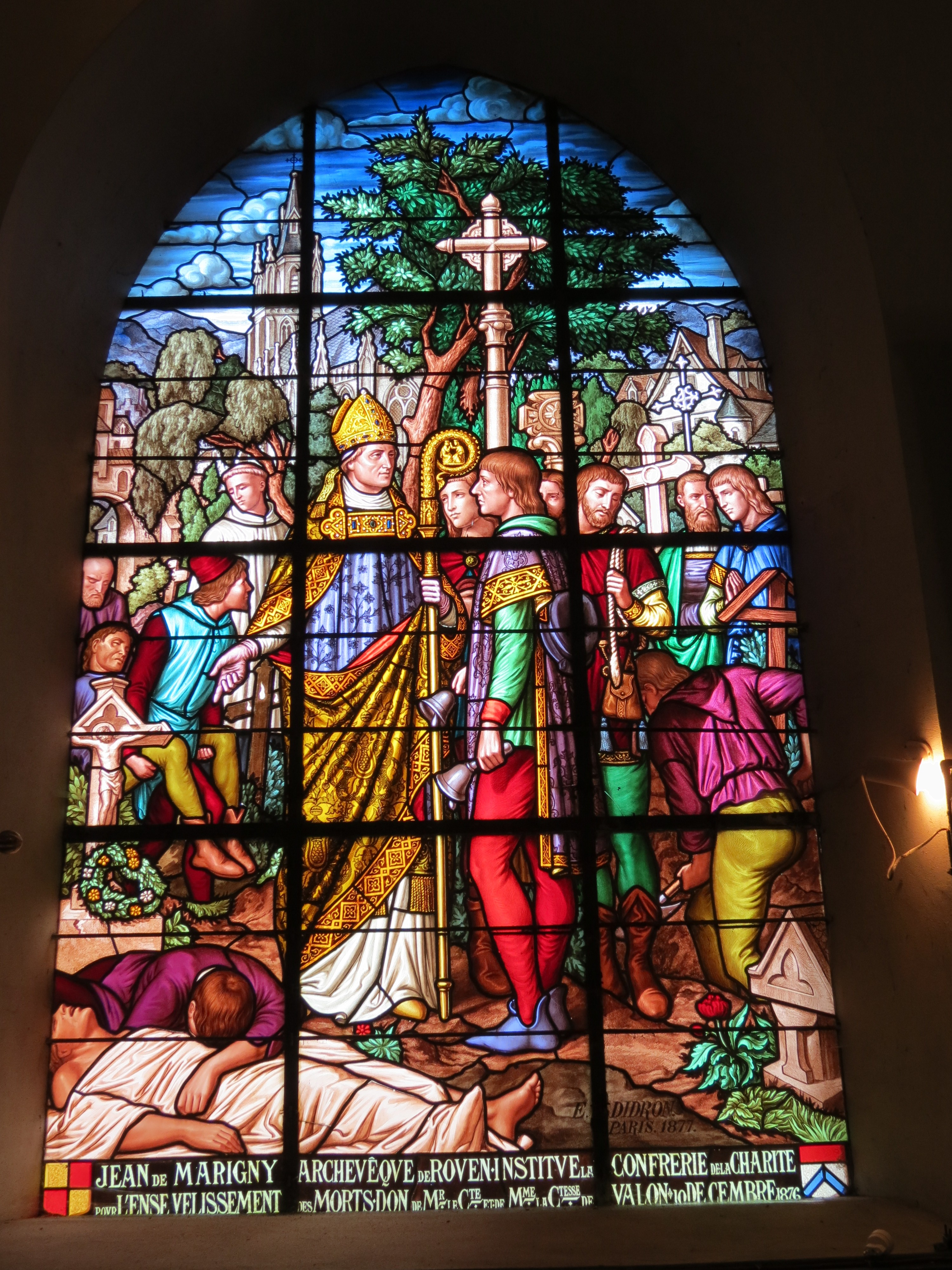
Stained glass inside the Église Saint-Ouen in Le Tronquay

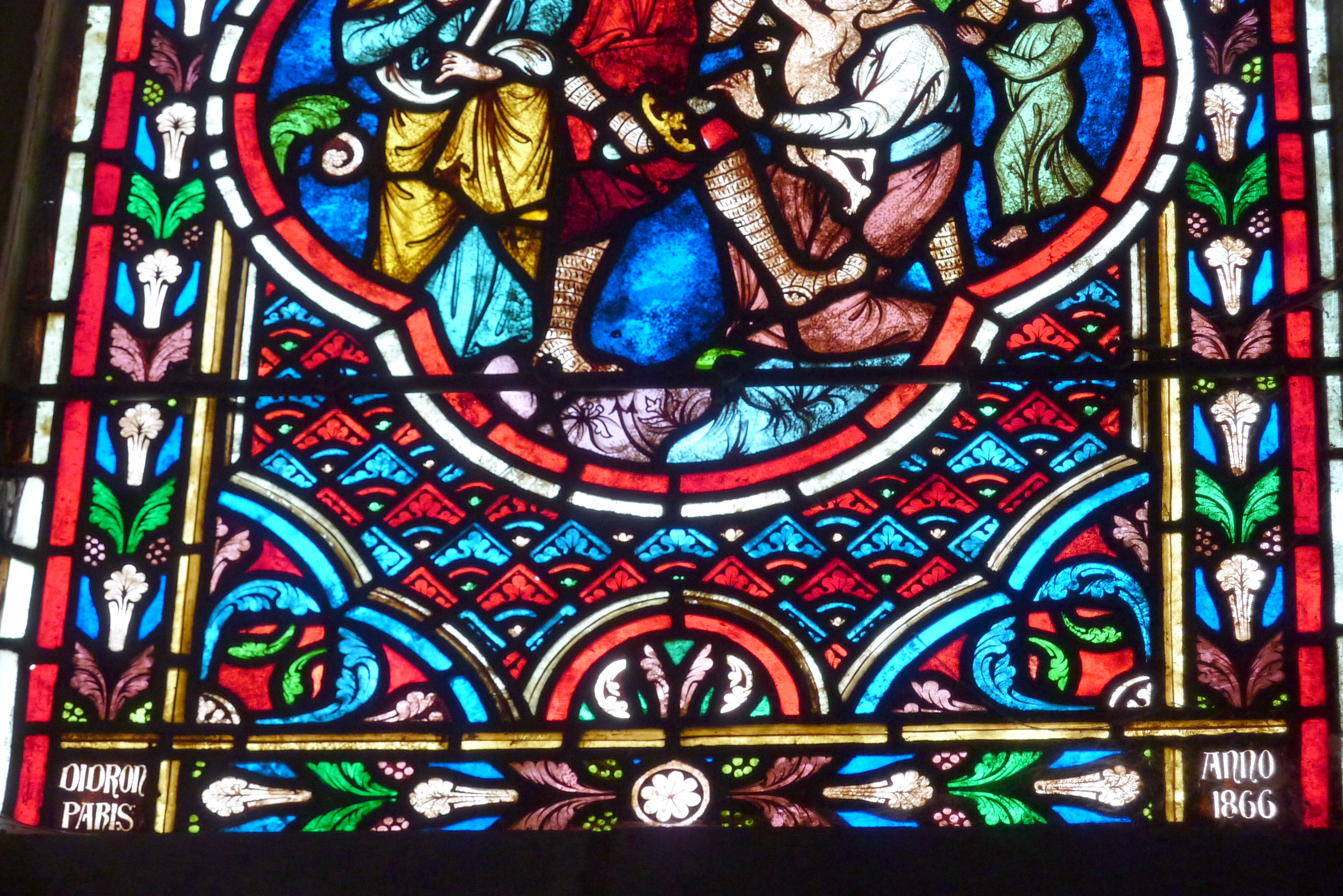
Stained glass inside the Église Notre-Dame in Neufchâtel-en-Bray

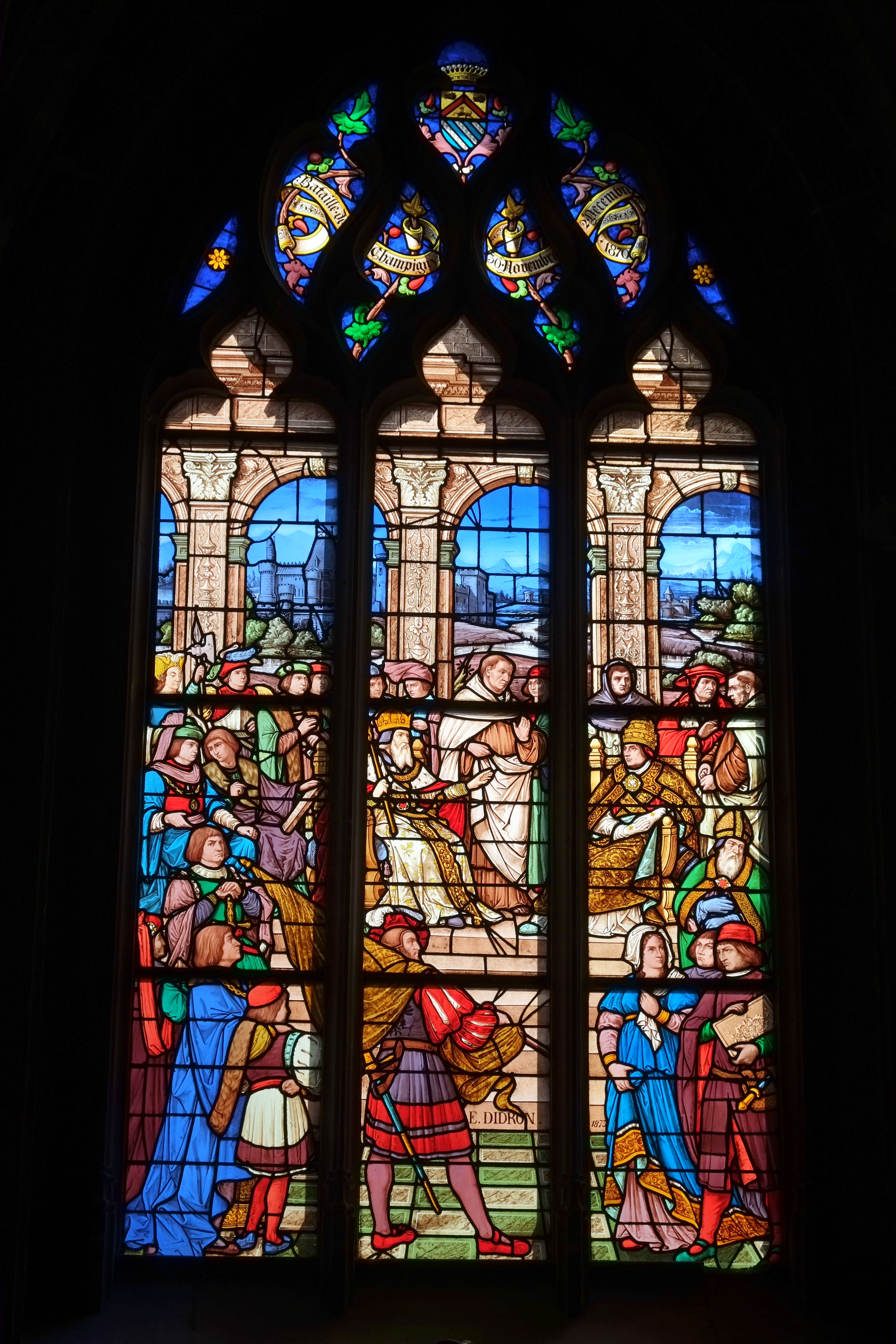
Stained glass inside the Église Notre-Dame in Neufchâtel-en-Bray

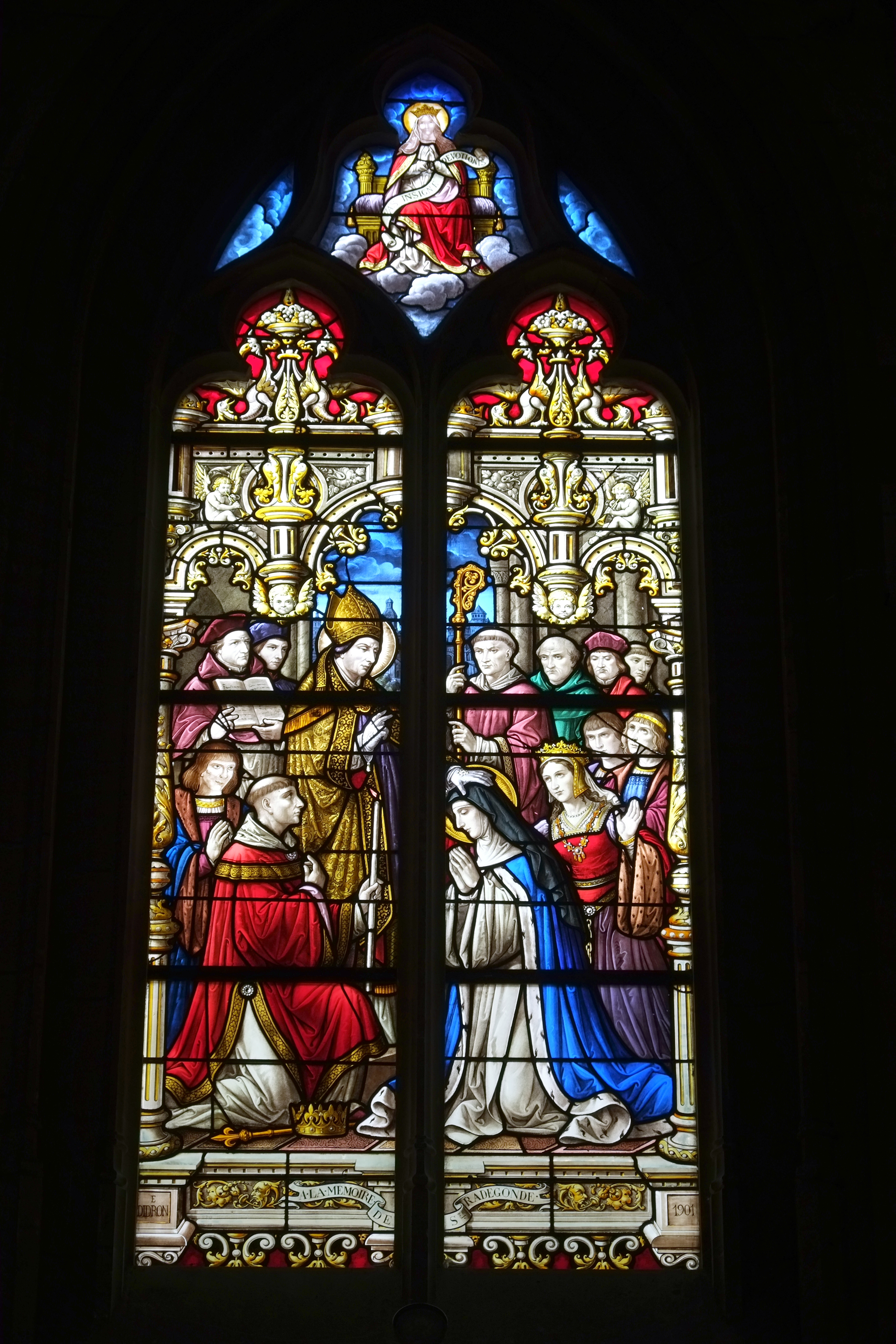
Stained glass inside the Église Notre-Dame in Neufchâtel-en-Bray

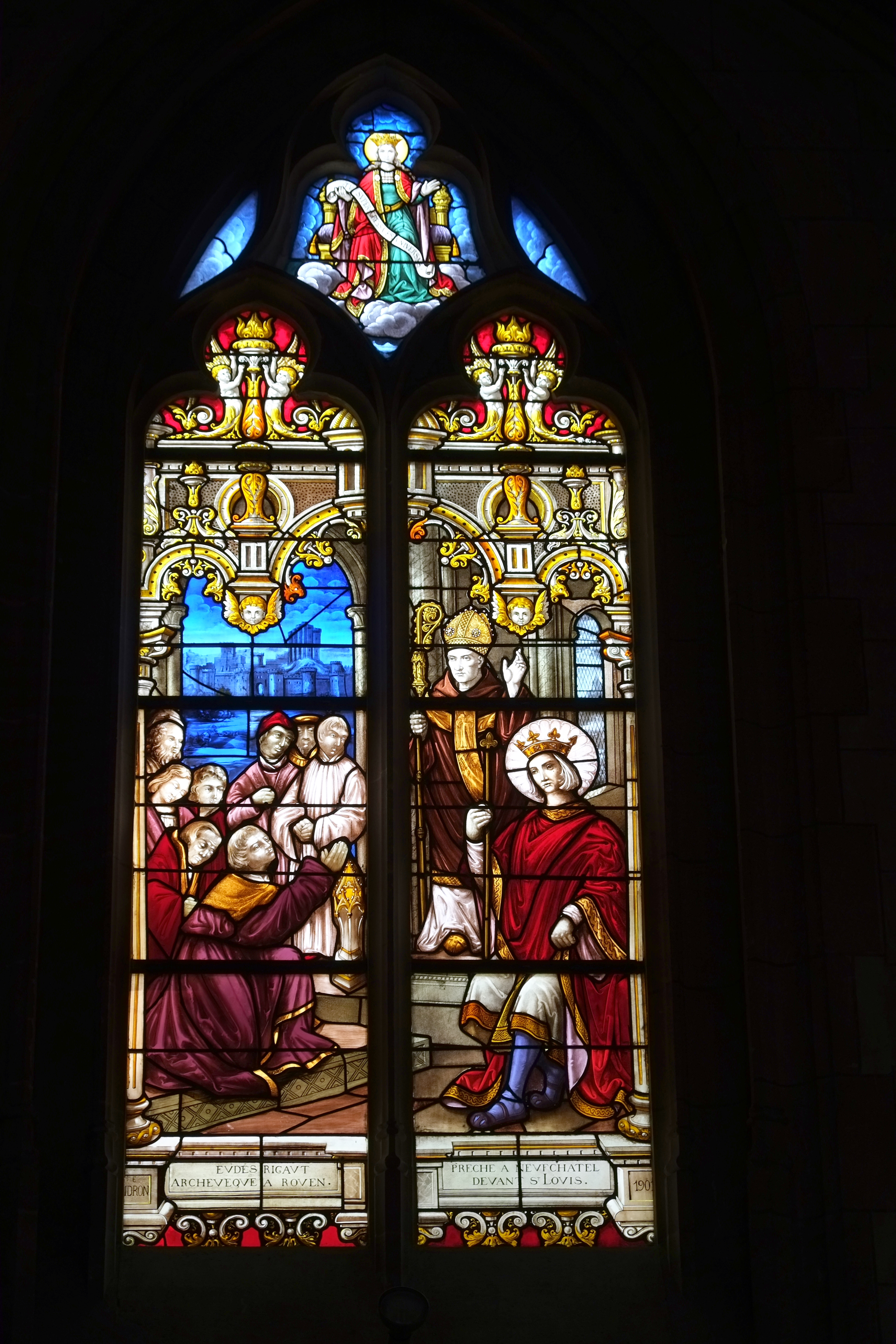
Stained glass inside the Église Notre-Dame in Neufchâtel-en-Bray

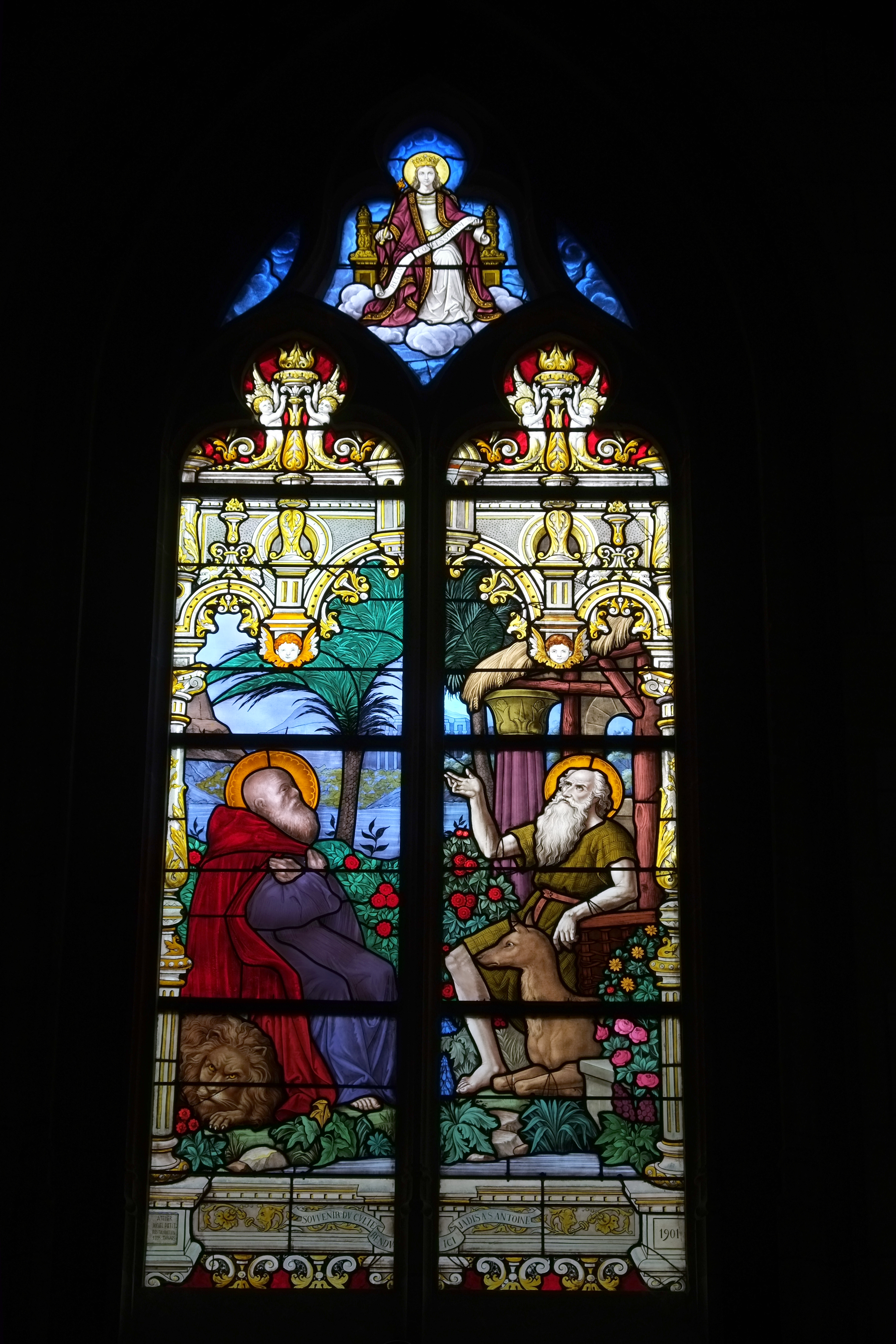
Stained glass inside the Église Notre-Dame in Neufchâtel-en-Bray

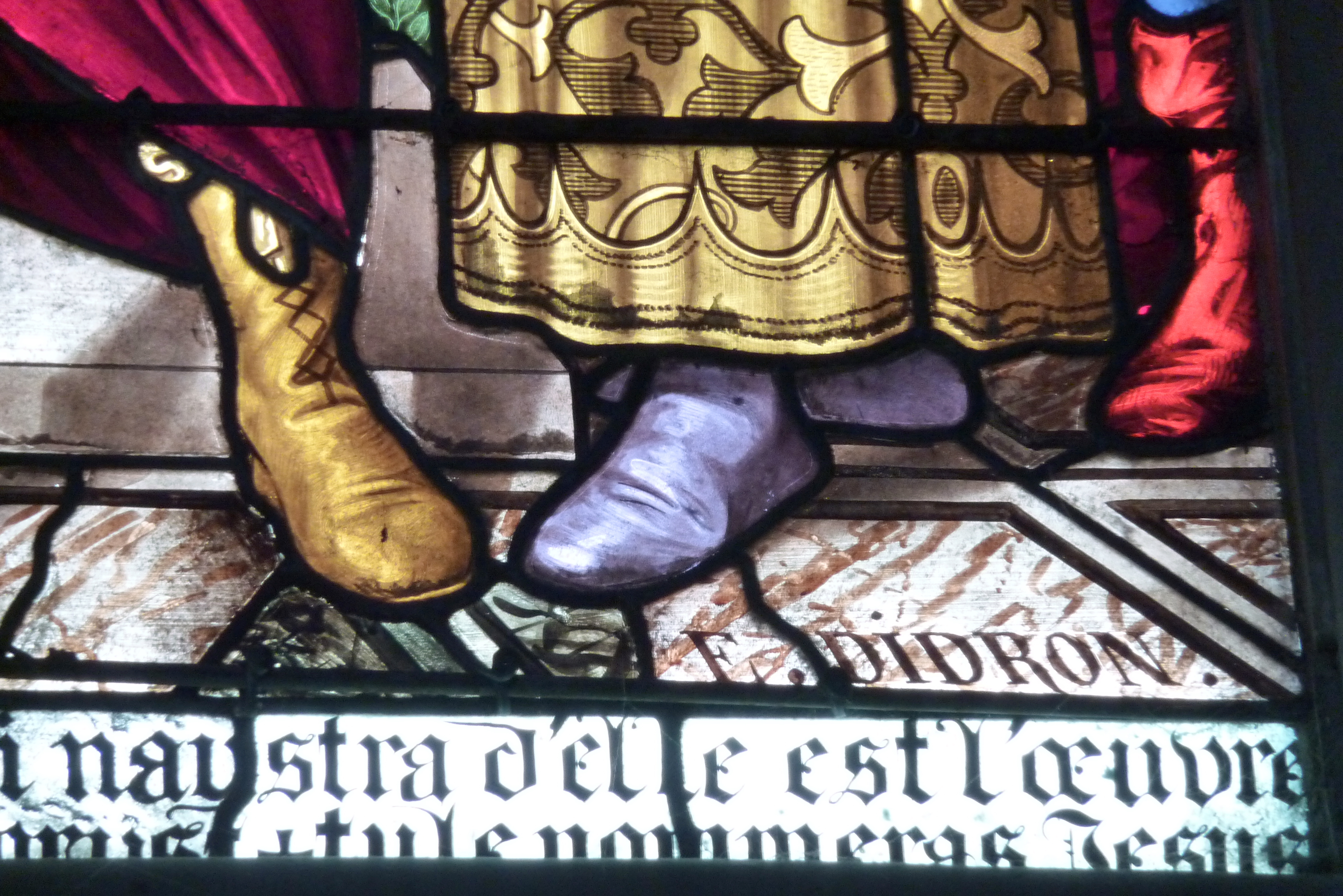
Stained glass inside the Cathédrale Saint-Maclou de Pontoise

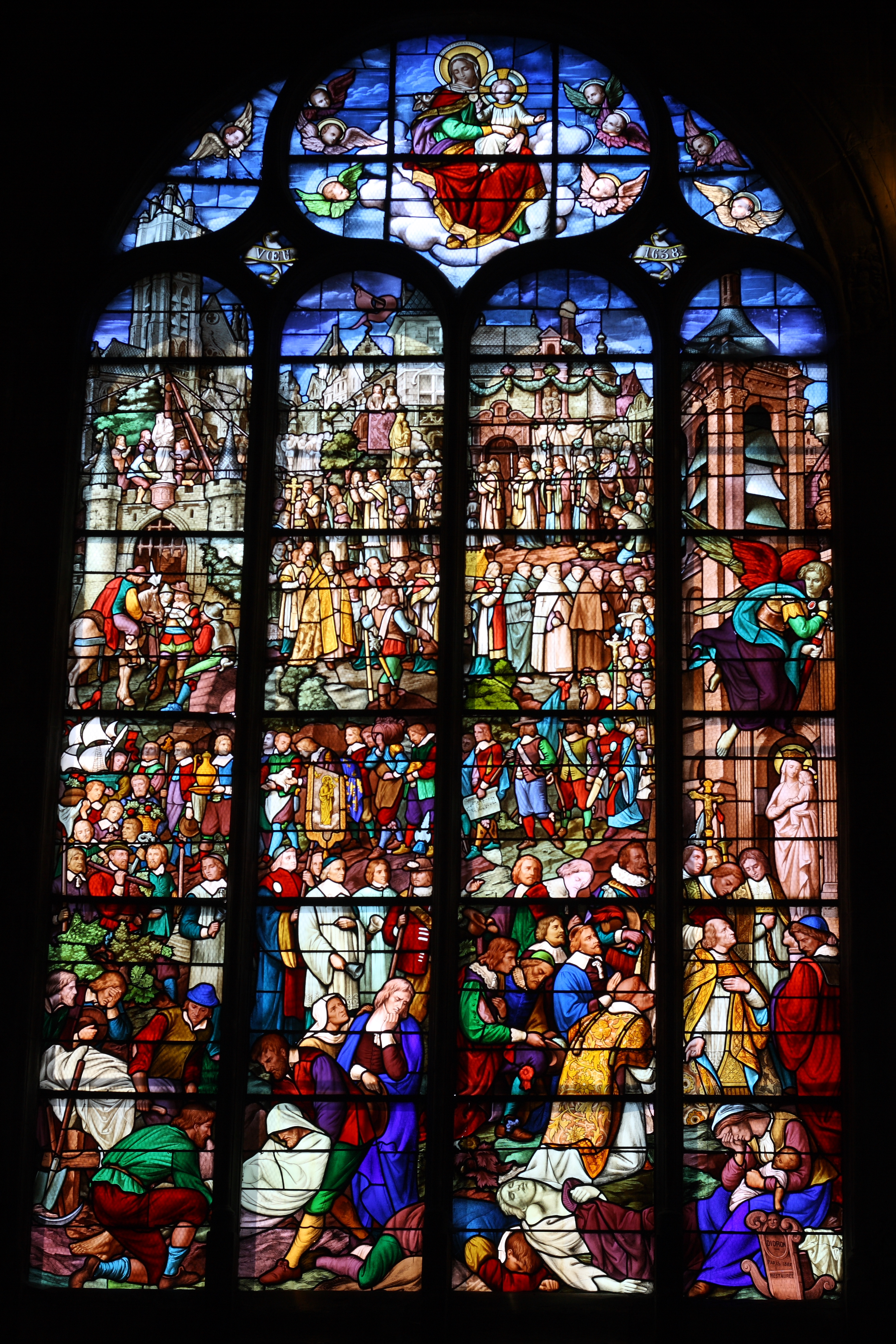
Stained glass inside the Cathédrale Saint-Maclou de Pontoise

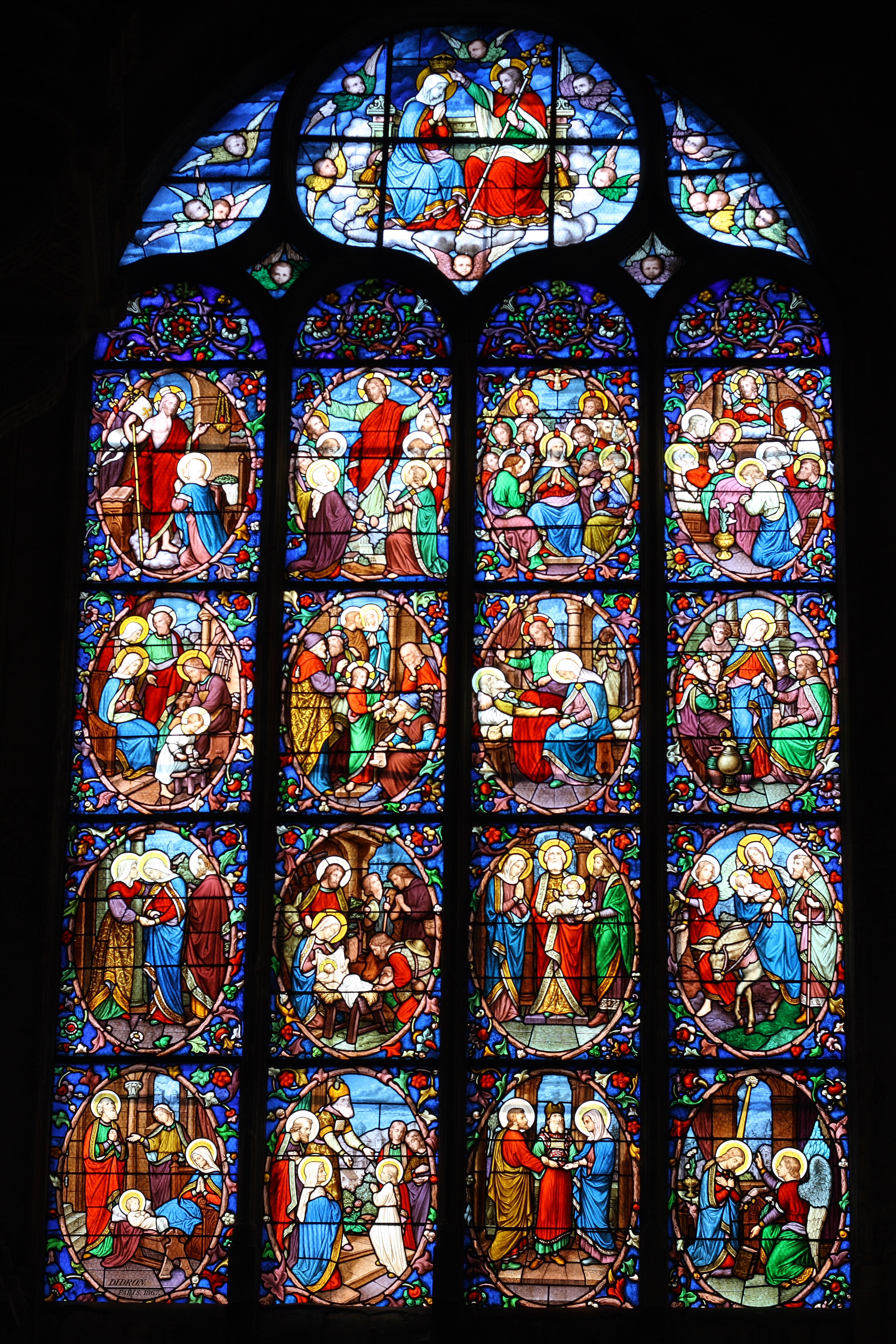
Stained glass inside the Cathédrale Saint-Maclou de Pontoise

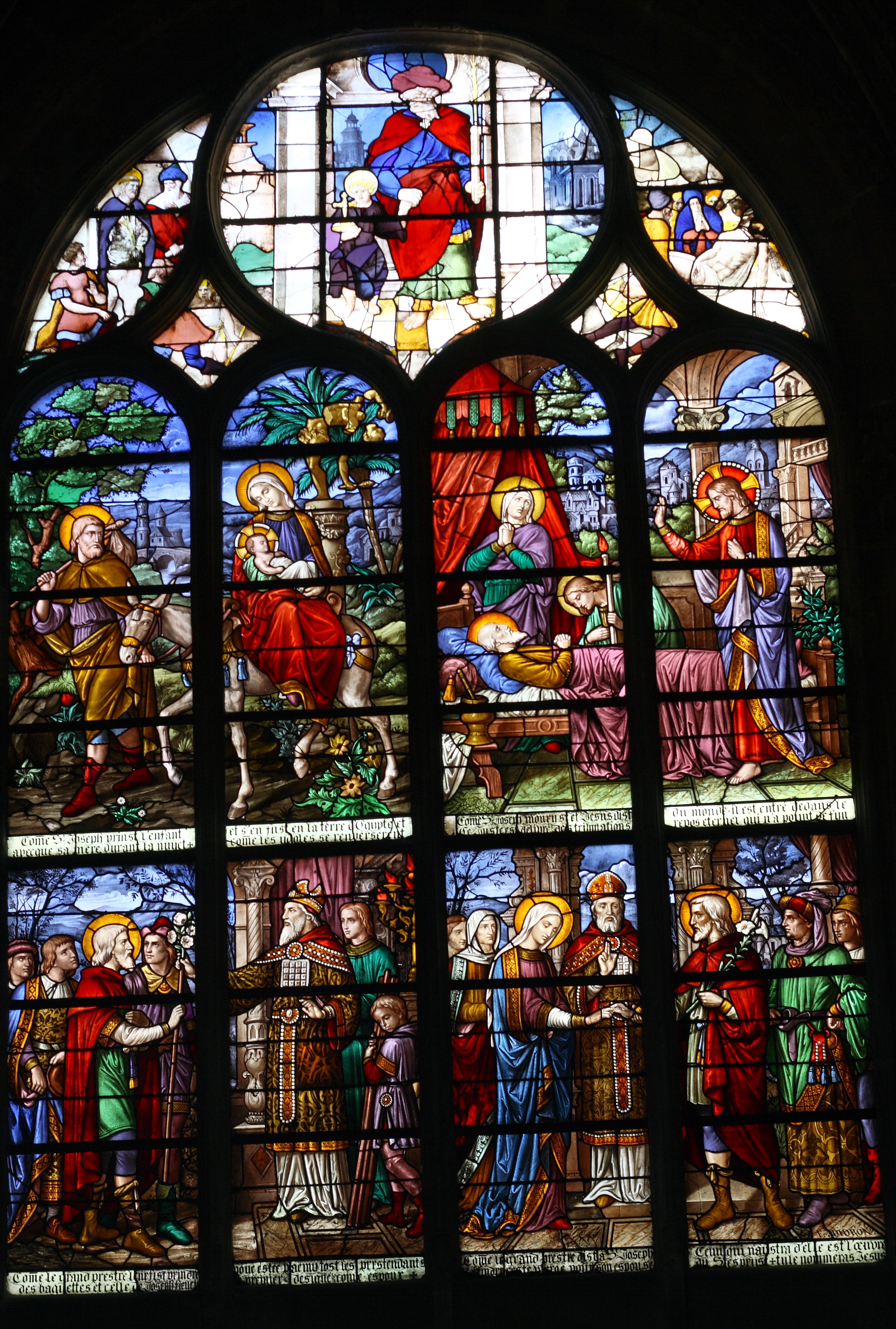
Stained glass inside the Cathédrale Saint-Maclou de Pontoise

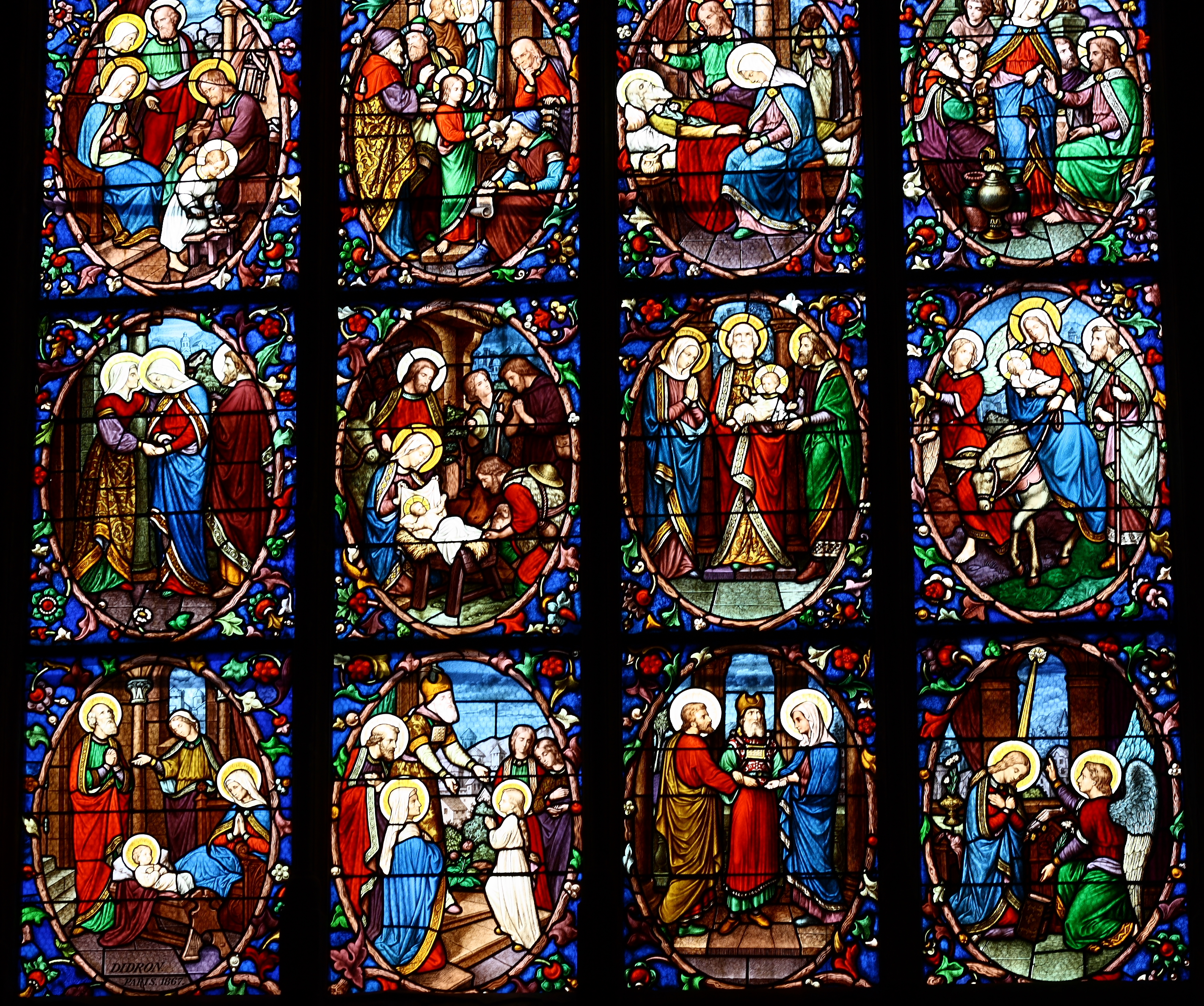
Stained glass inside the Cathédrale Saint-Maclou de Pontoise

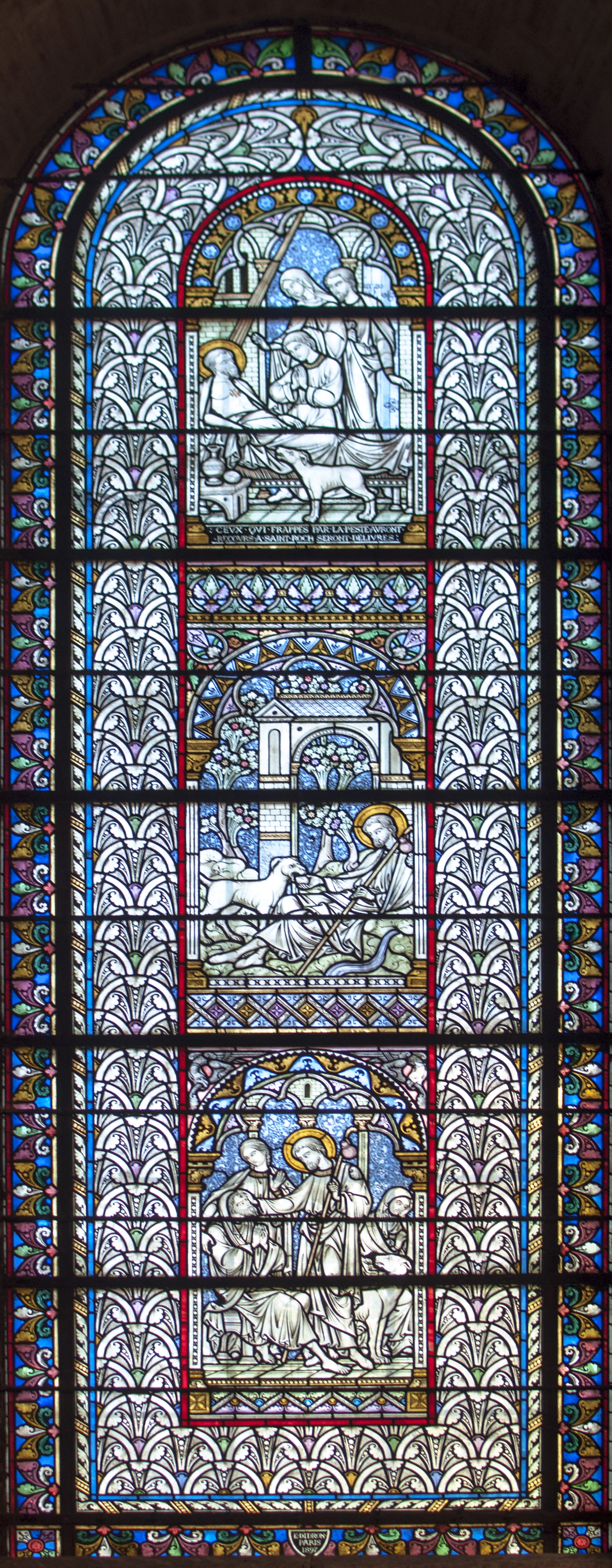
Stained glass inside the Basilica of St. Sernin, Toulouse

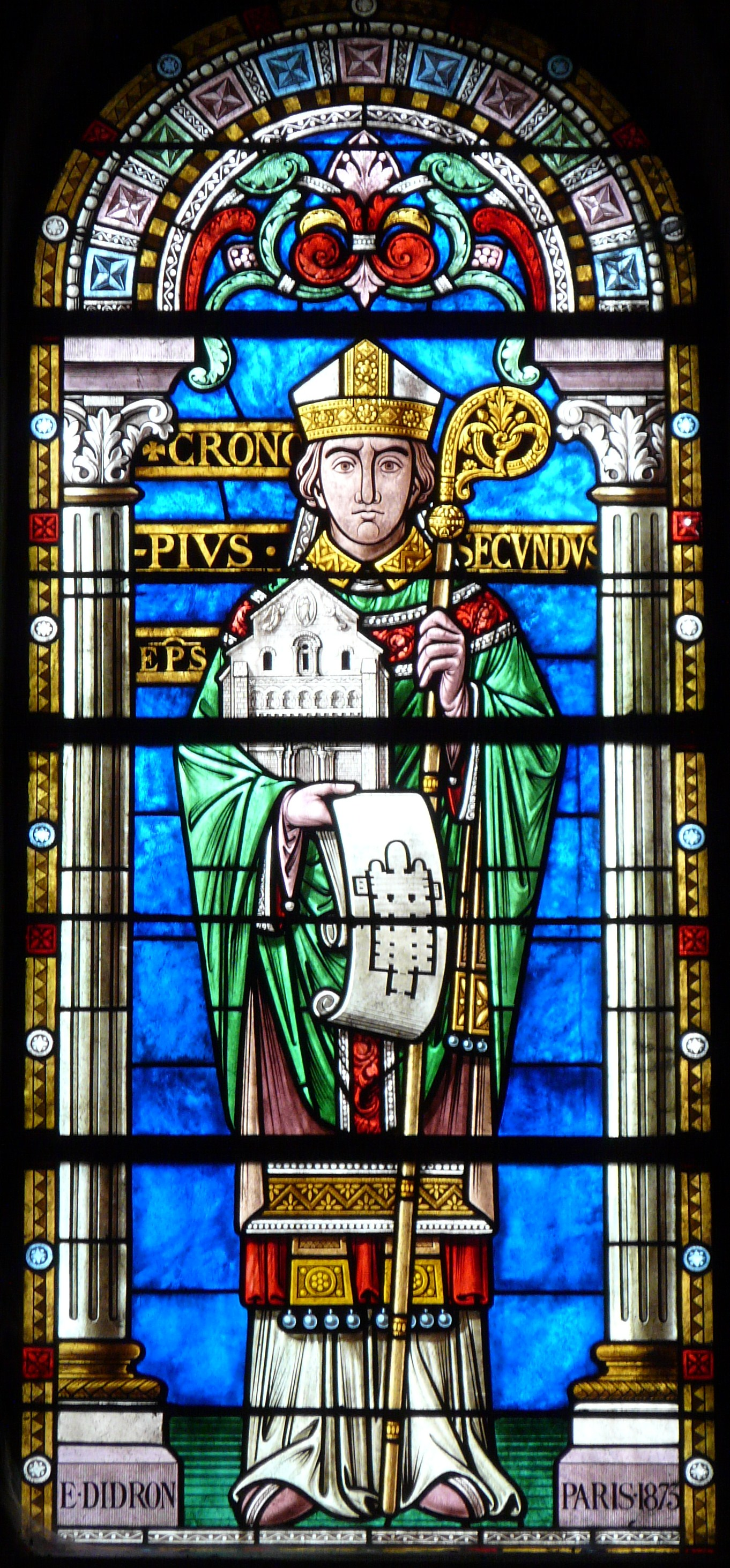
Stained glass inside the Cathédrale Saint-Front de Périgueux

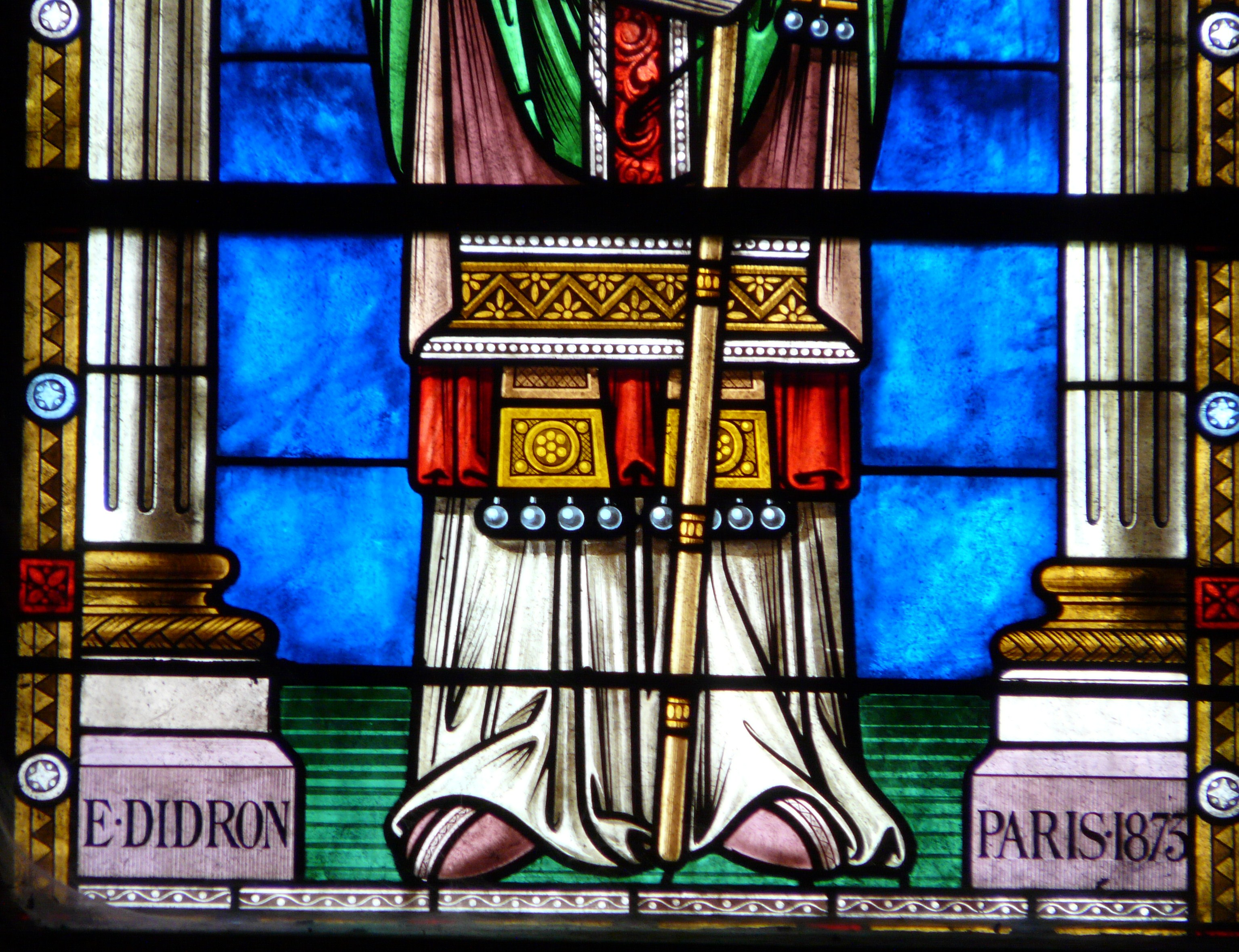
Stained glass inside the Cathédrale Saint-Front de Périgueux

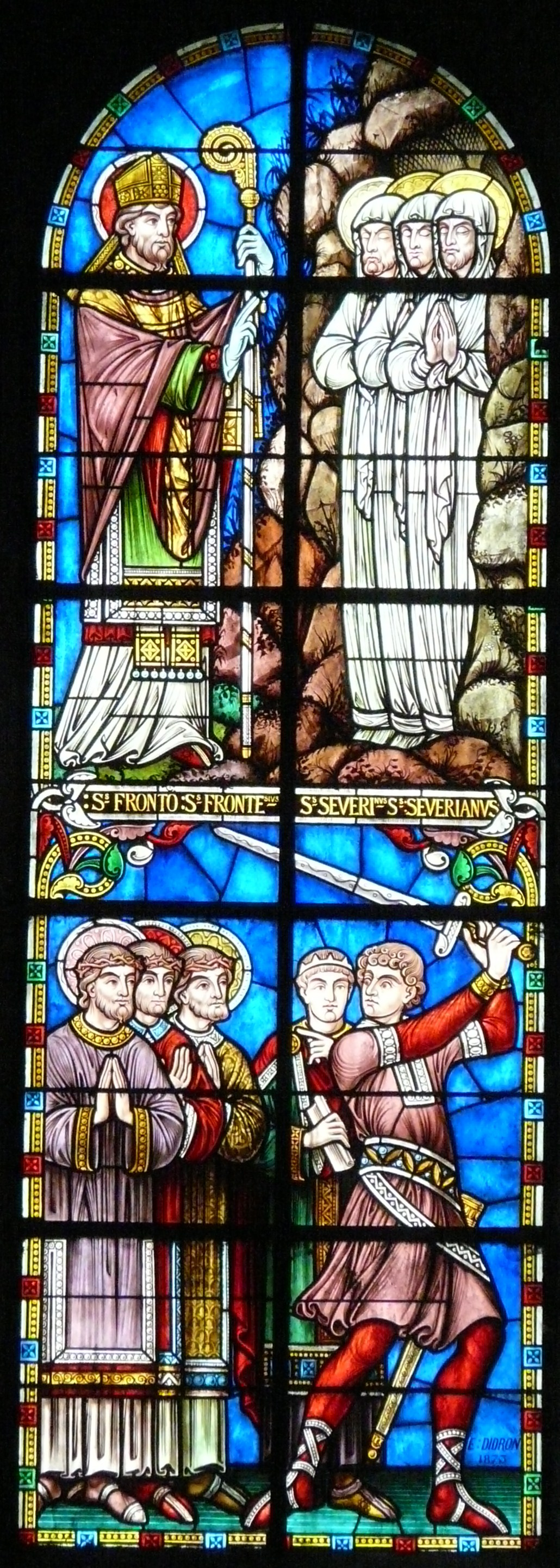
Stained glass inside the Cathédrale Saint-Front de Périgueux

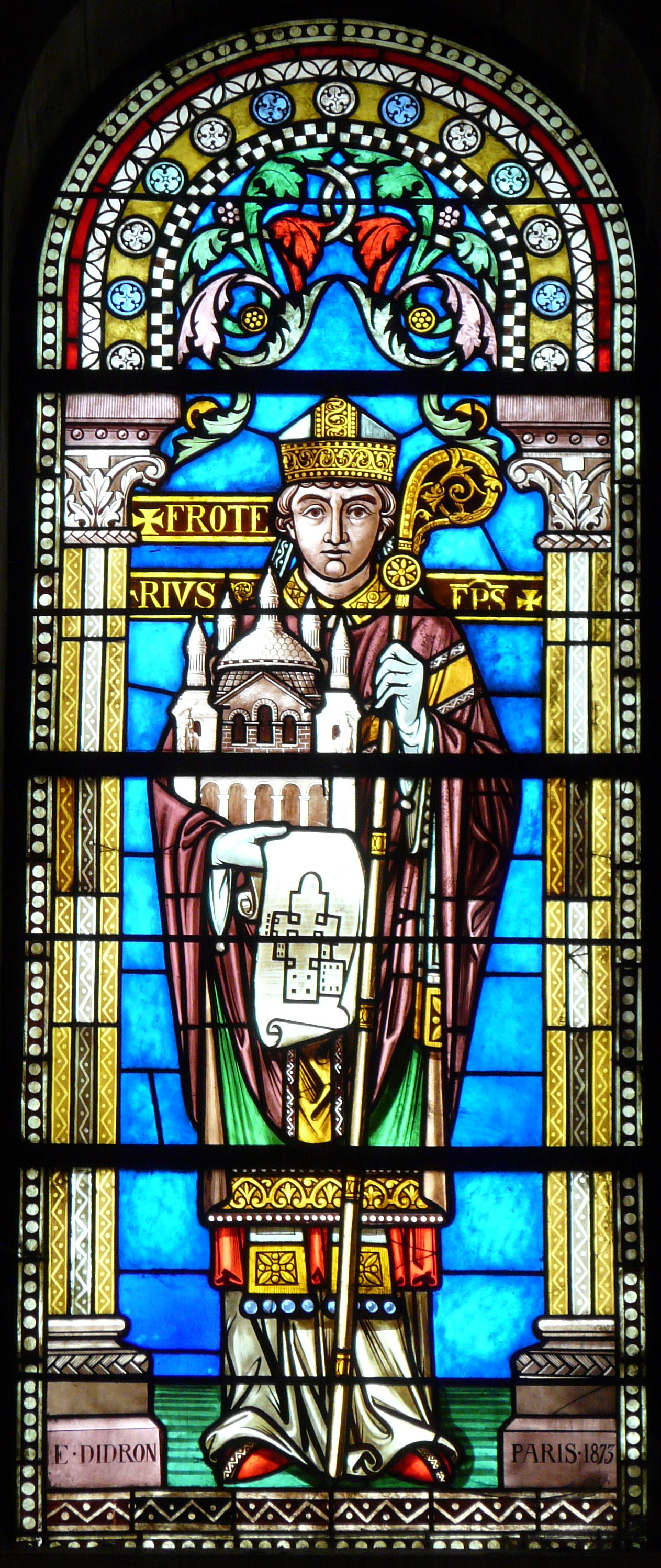
Stained glass inside the Cathédrale Saint-Front de Périgueux

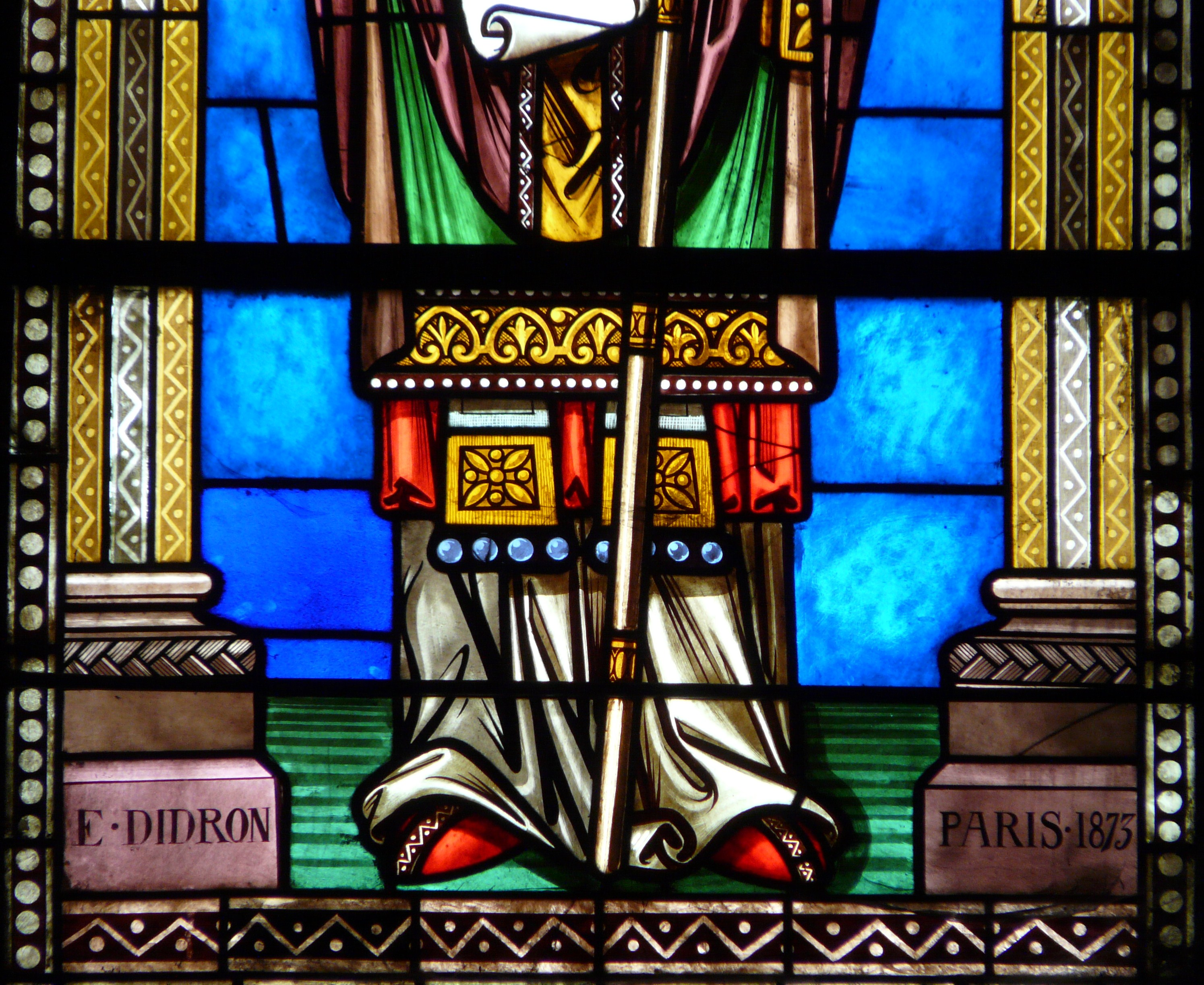
Stained glass inside the Cathédrale Saint-Front de Périgueux

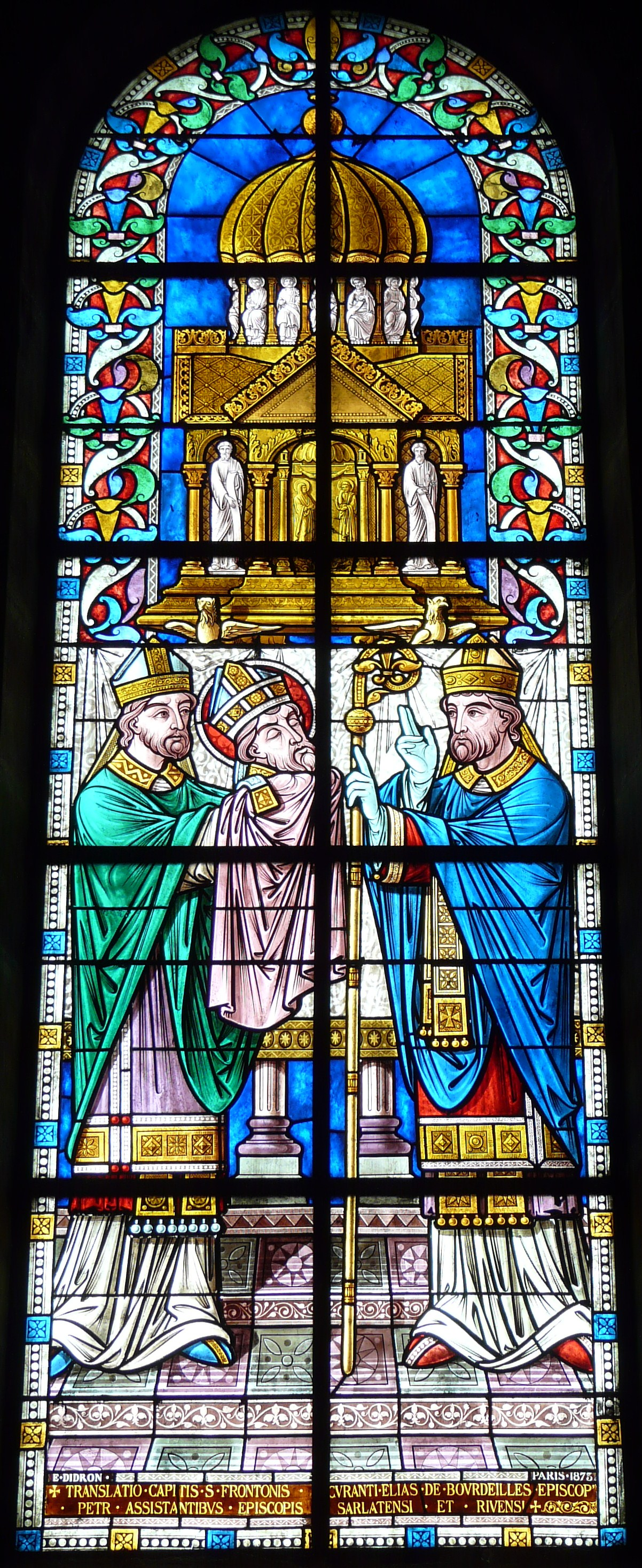
Stained glass inside the Cathédrale Saint-Front de Périgueux

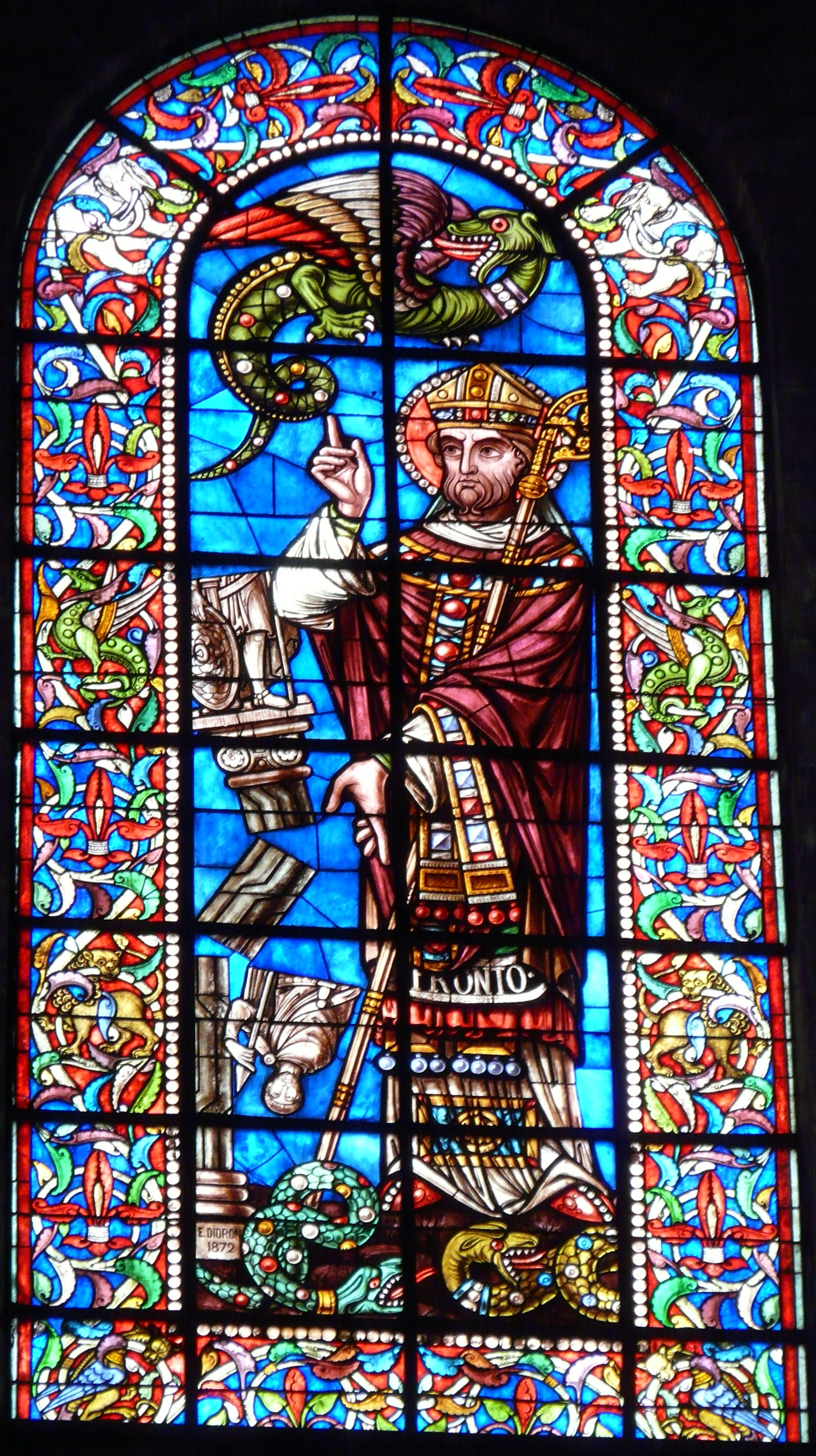
Stained glass inside the Cathédrale Saint-Front de Périgueux

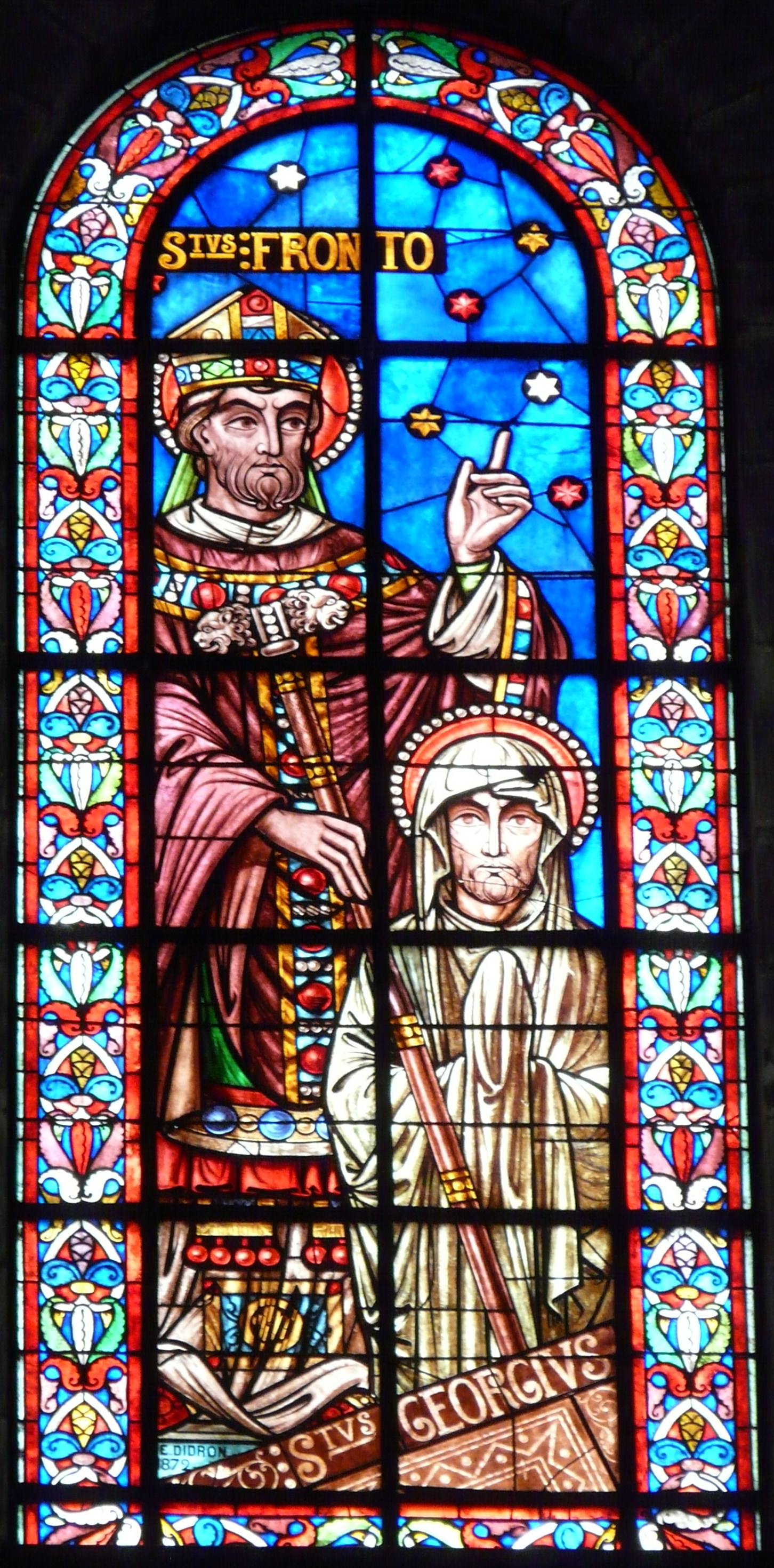
Stained glass inside the Cathédrale Saint-Front de Périgueux

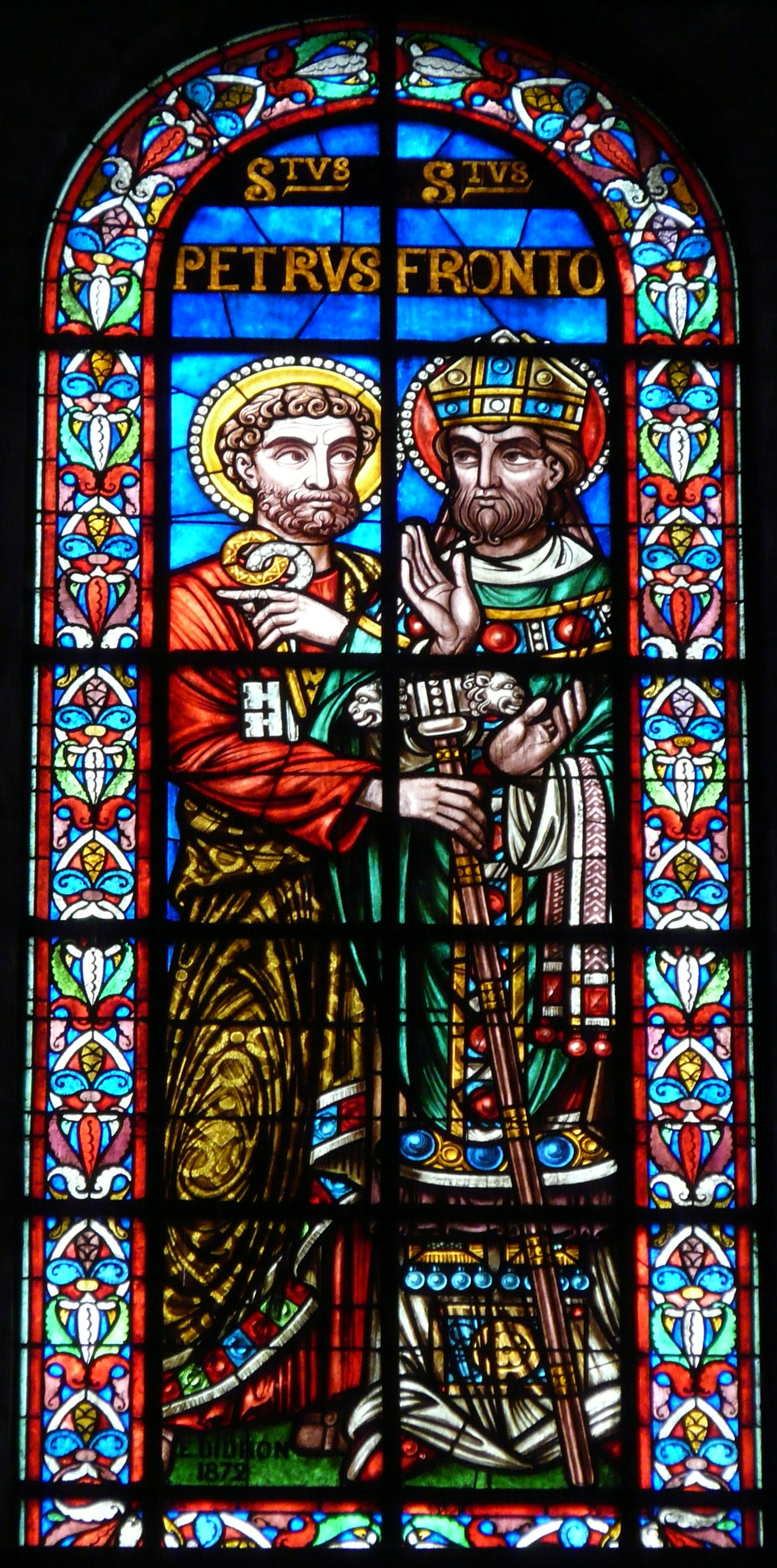
Stained glass inside the Cathédrale Saint-Front de Périgueux

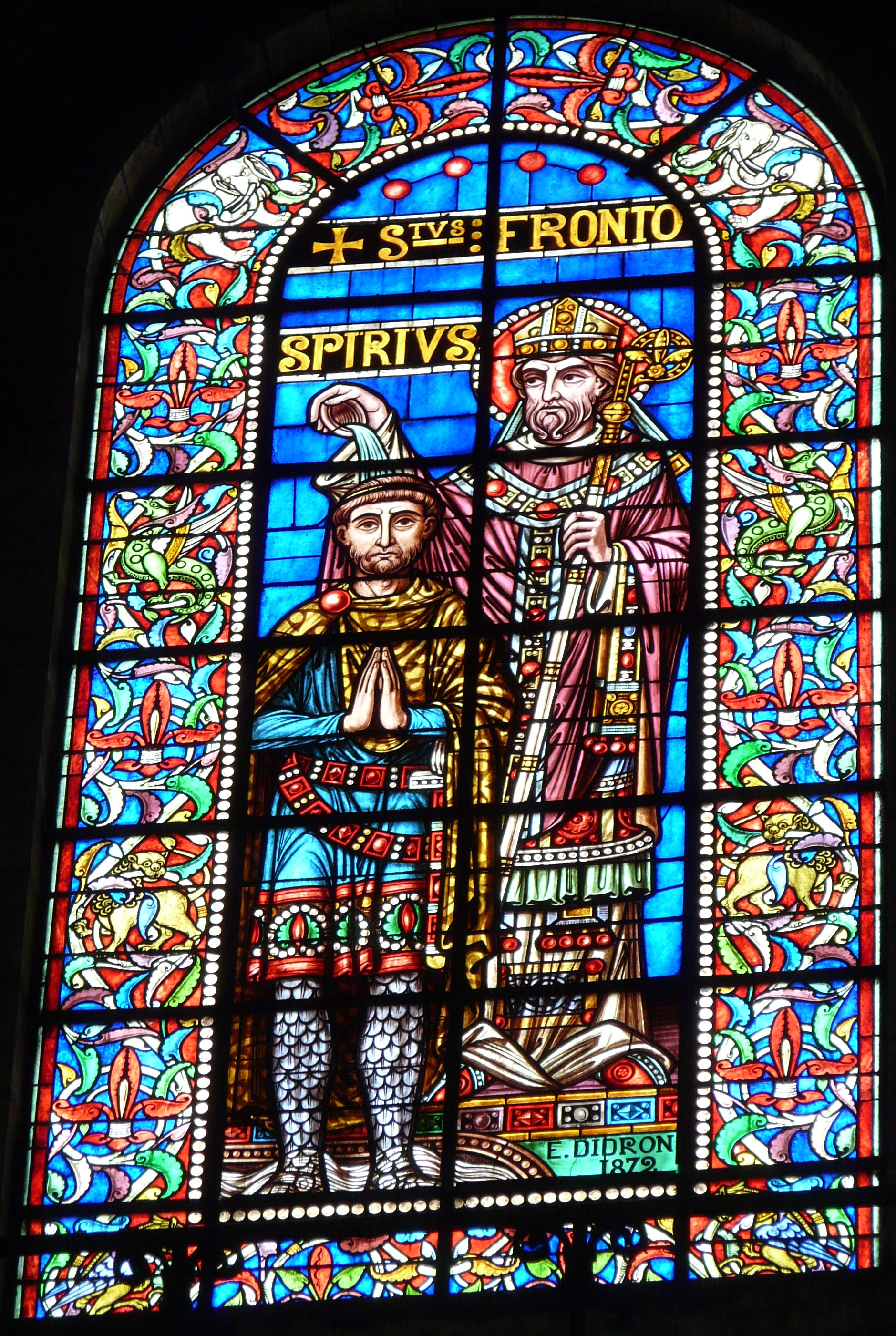
Stained glass inside the Cathédrale Saint-Front de Périgueux

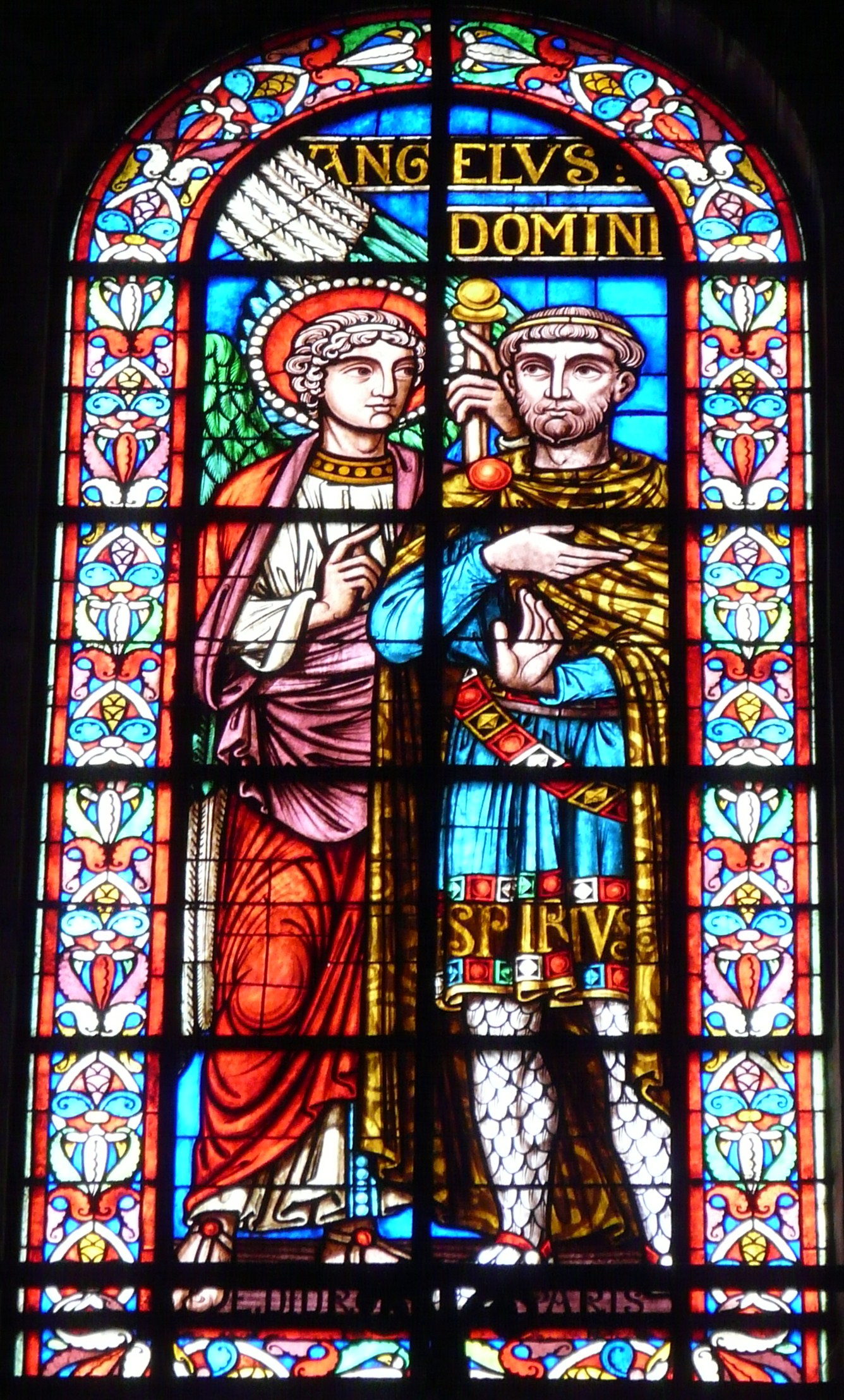
Stained glass inside the Cathédrale Saint-Front de Périgueux

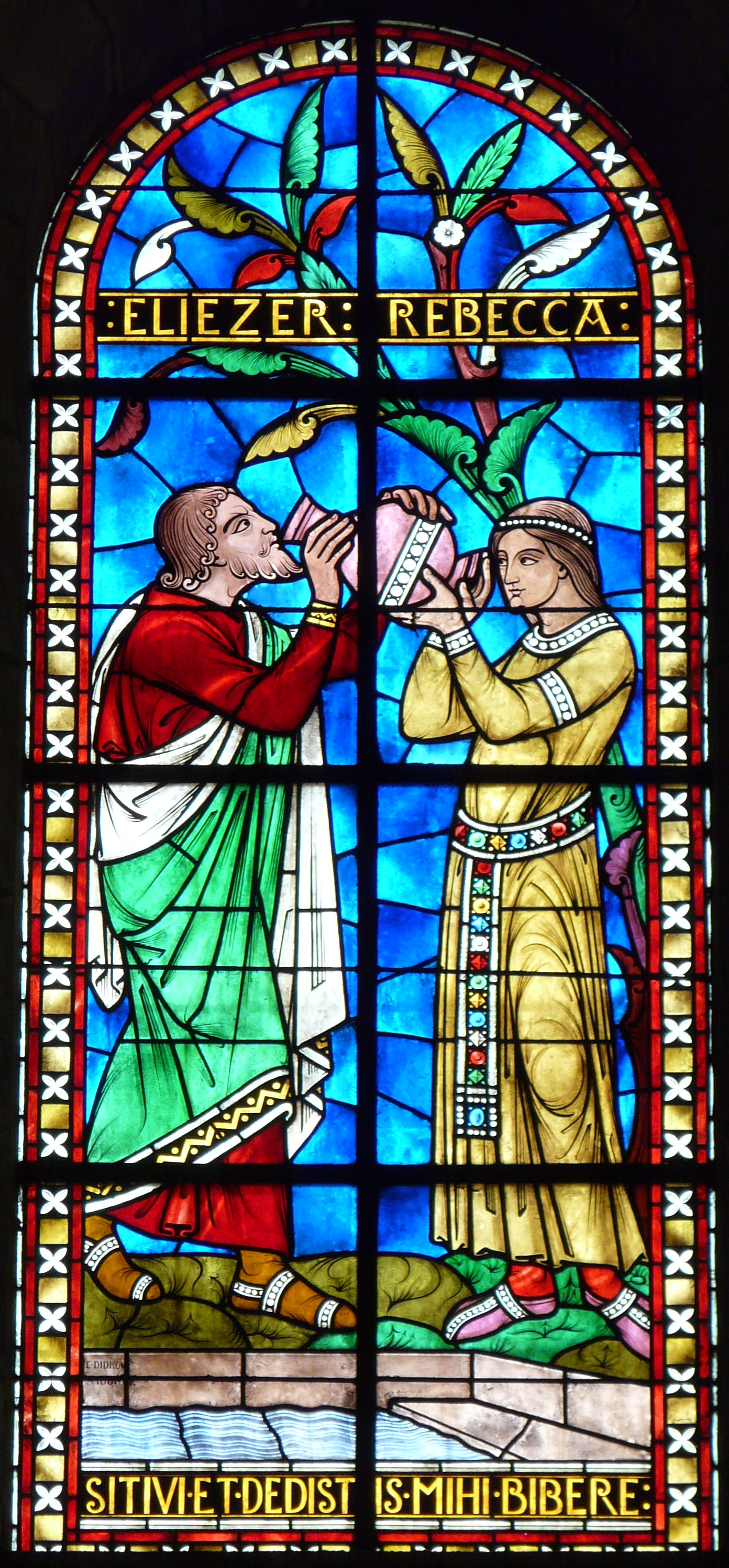
Stained glass inside the Cathédrale Saint-Front de Périgueux

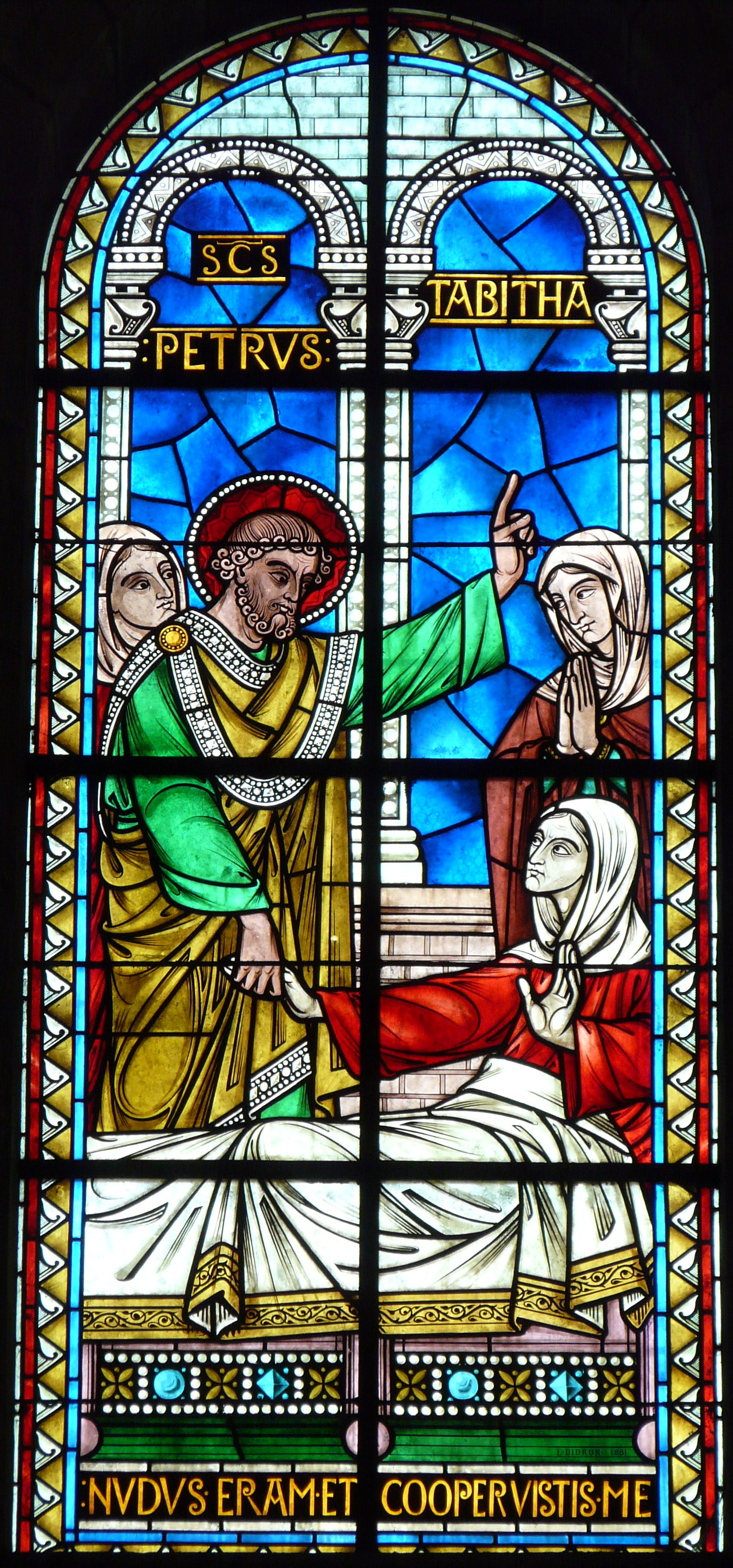
Stained glass inside the Cathédrale Saint-Front de Périgueux

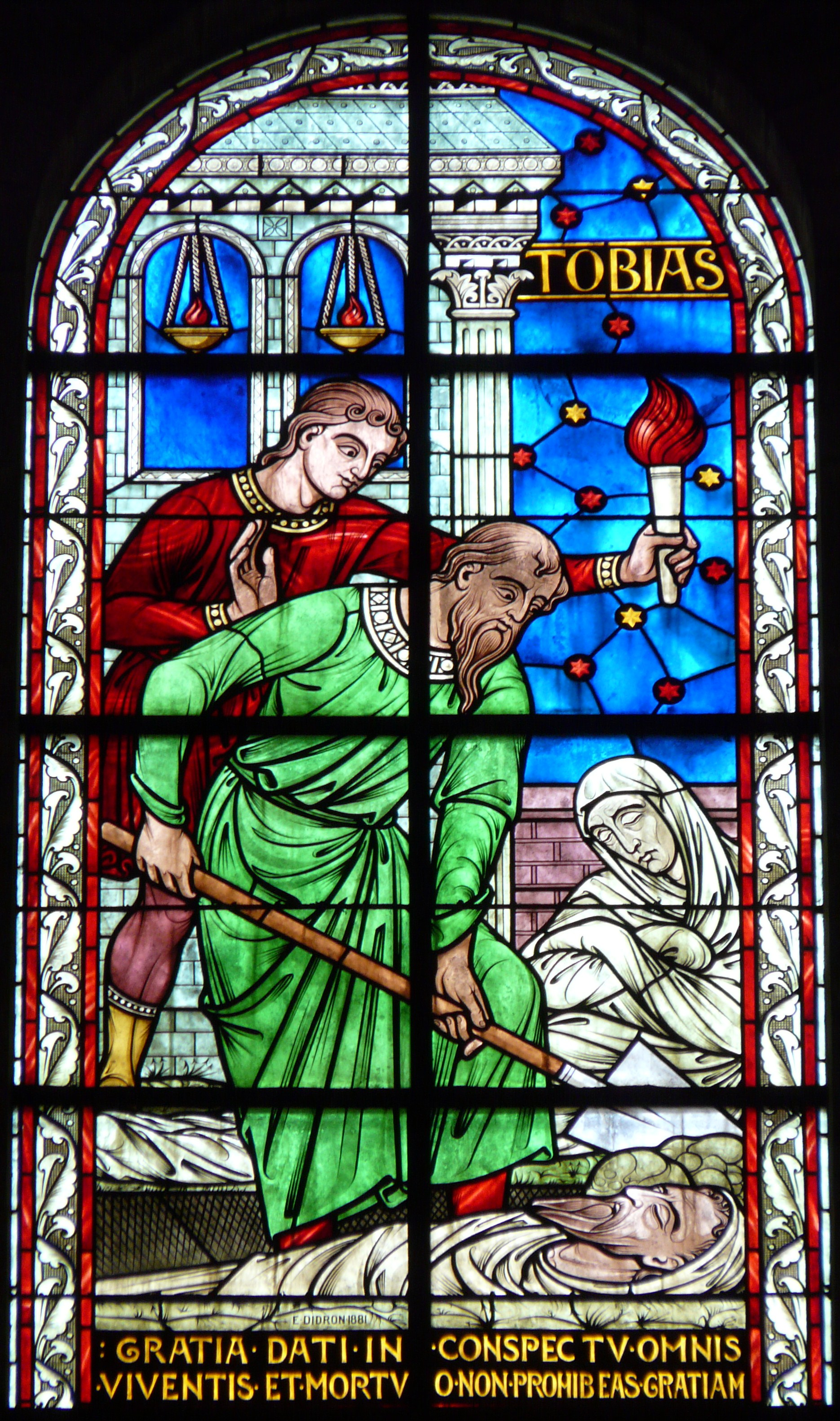
Stained glass inside the Cathédrale Saint-Front de Périgueux

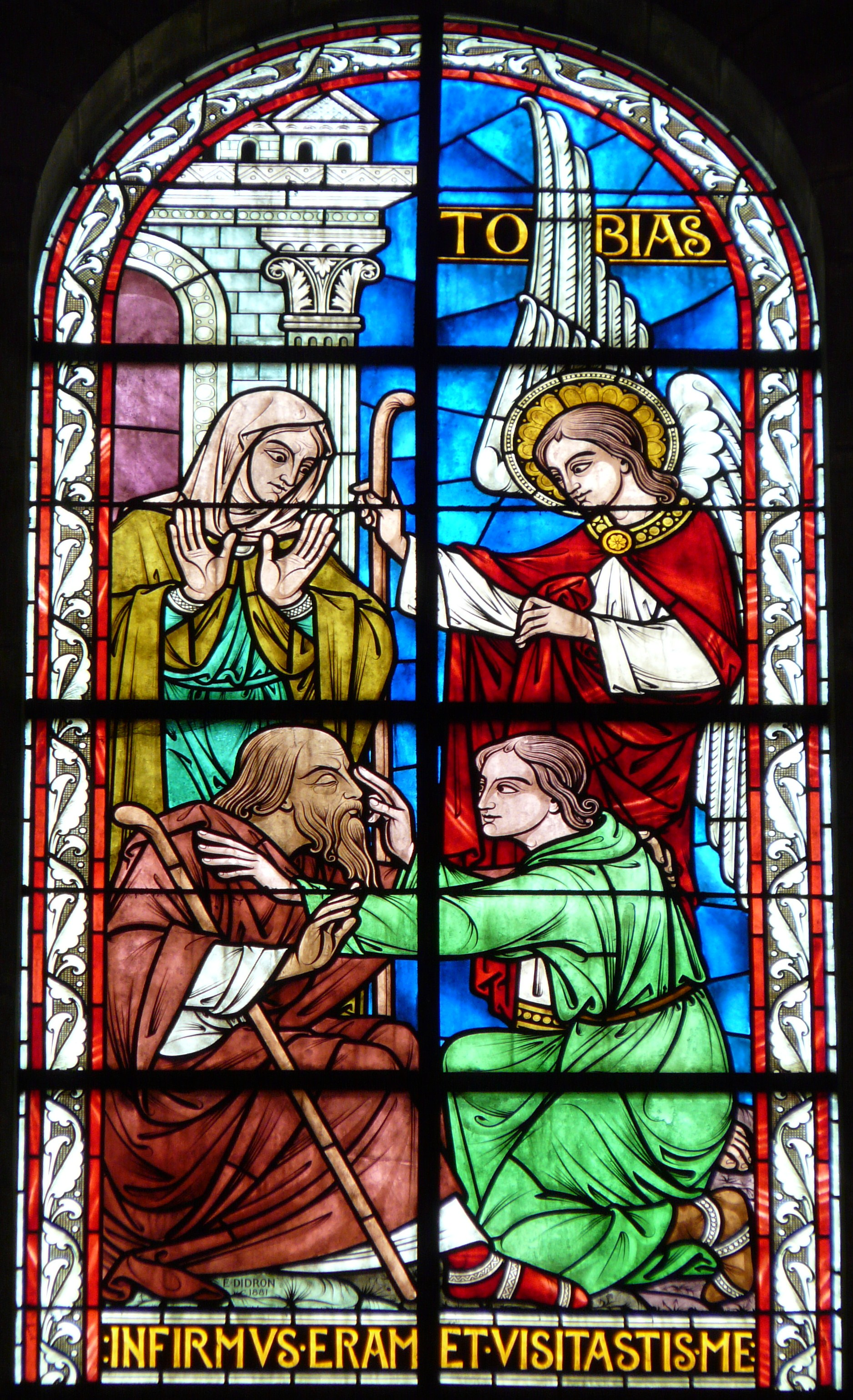
Stained glass inside the Cathédrale Saint-Front de Périgueux

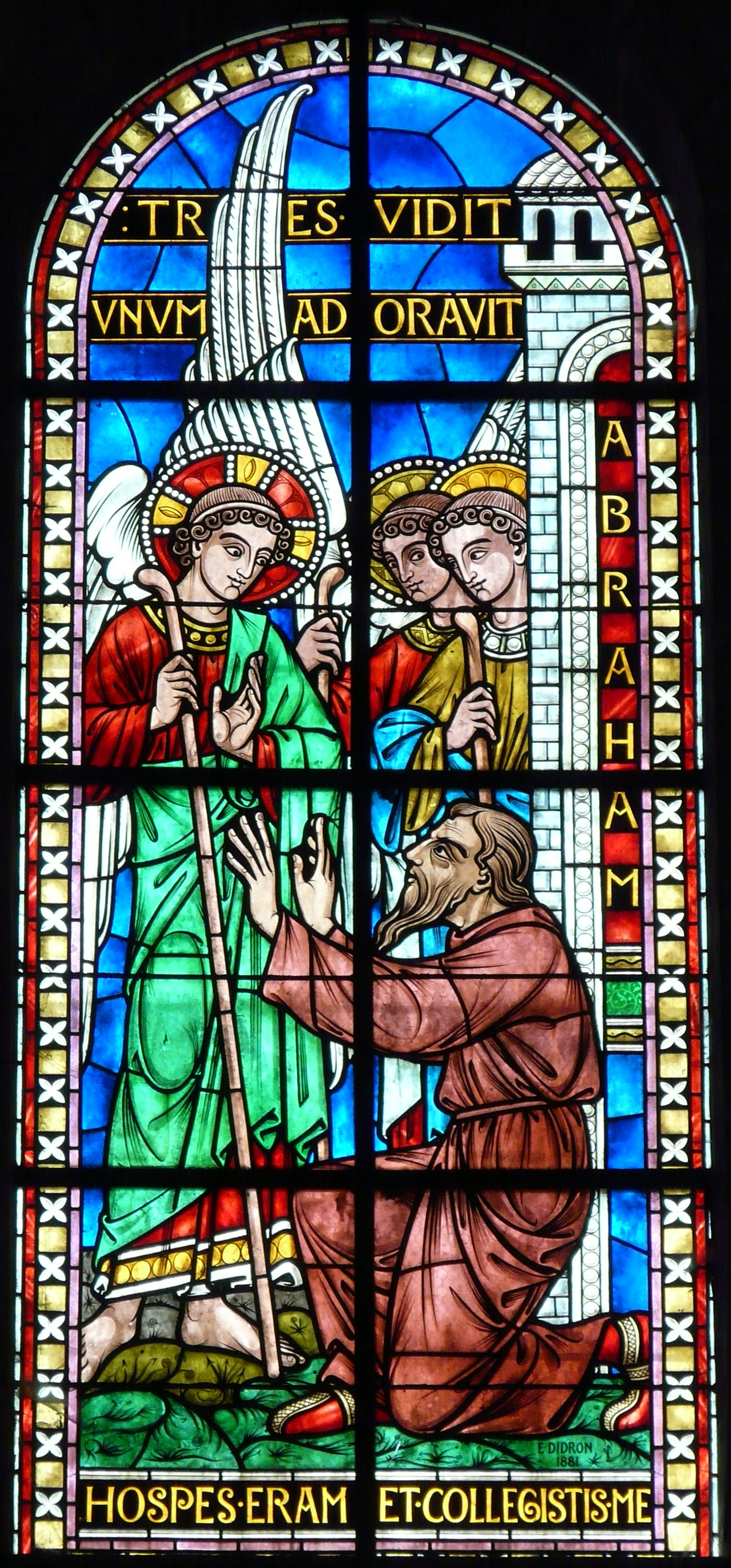
Stained glass inside the Cathédrale Saint-Front de Périgueux

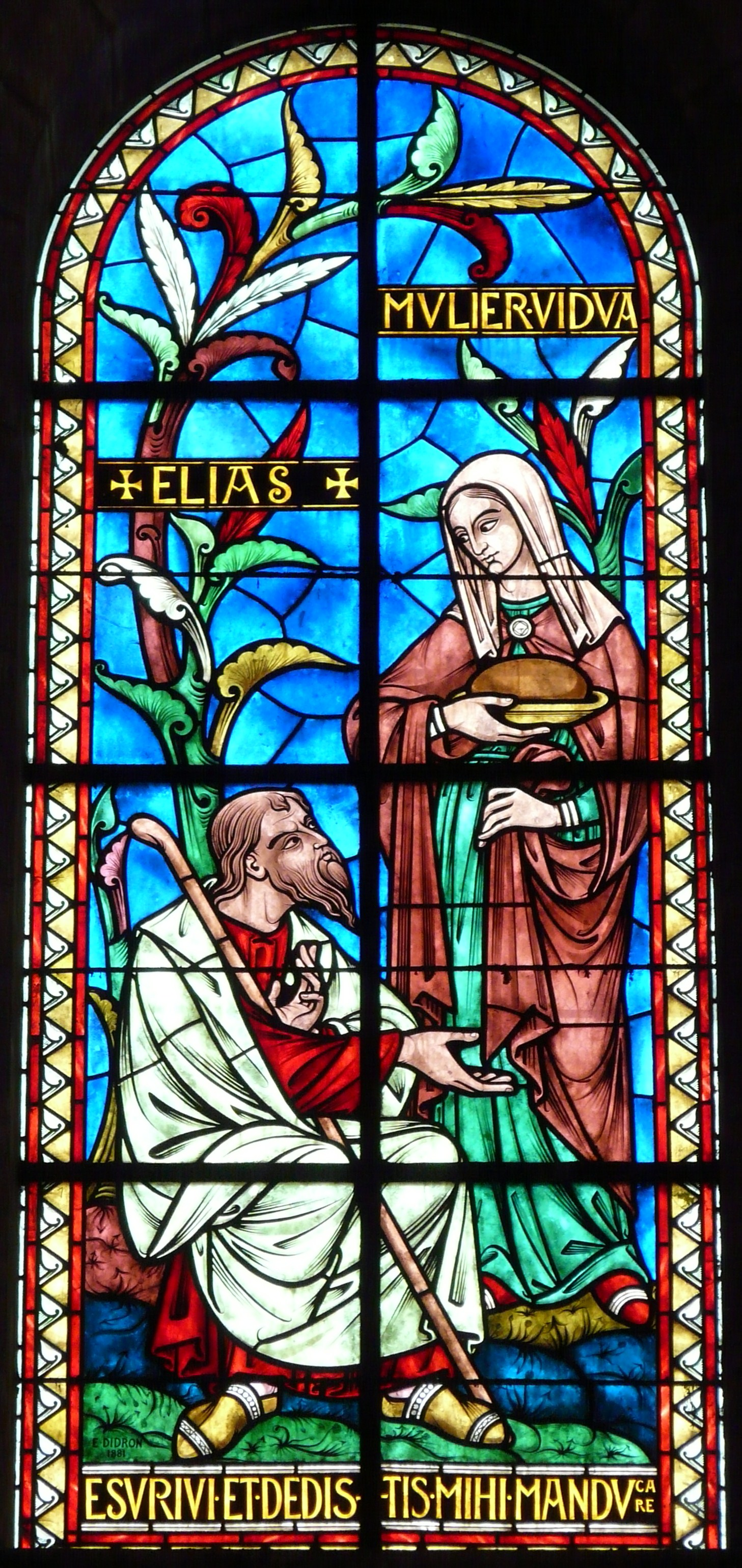
Stained glass inside the Cathédrale Saint-Front de Périgueux

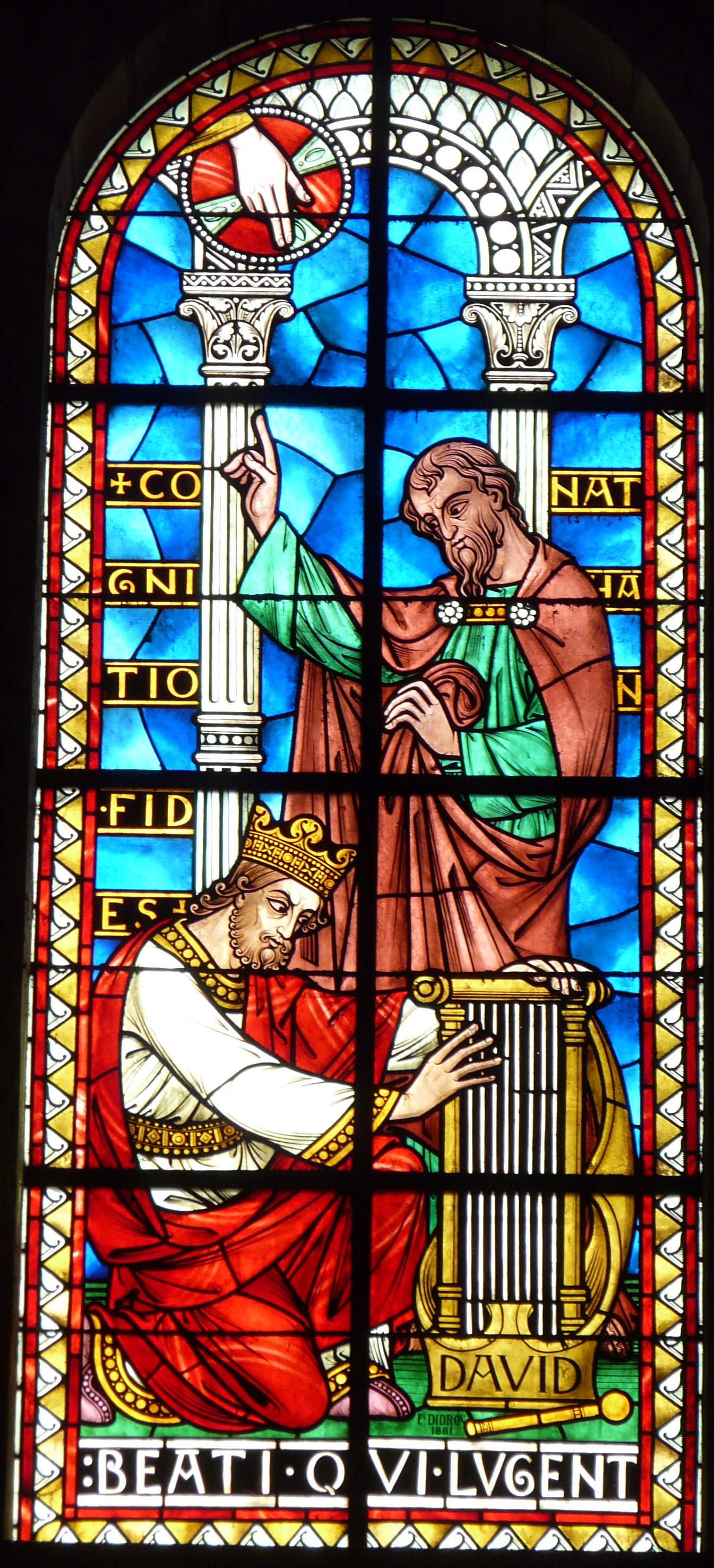
Stained glass inside the Cathédrale Saint-Front de Périgueux

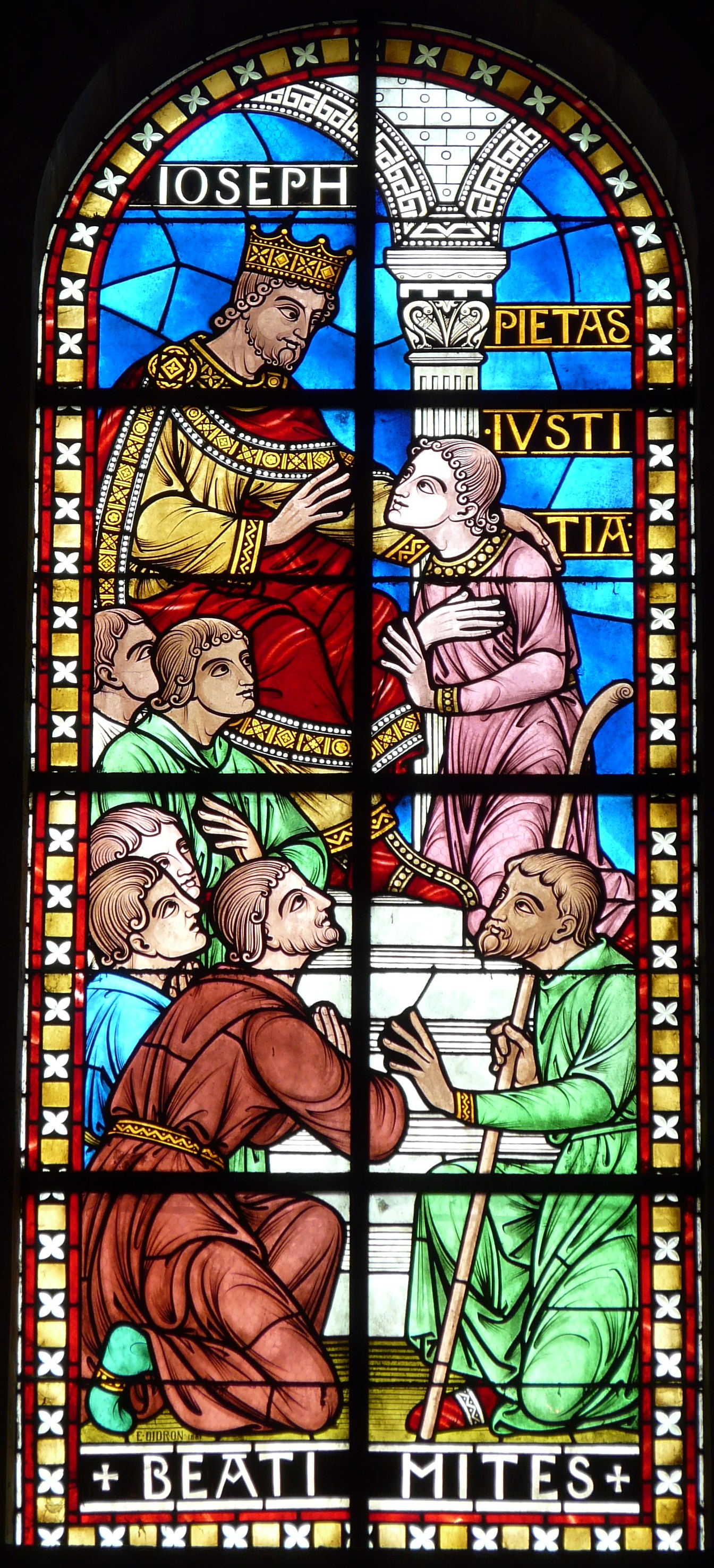
Stained glass inside the Cathédrale Saint-Front de Périgueux

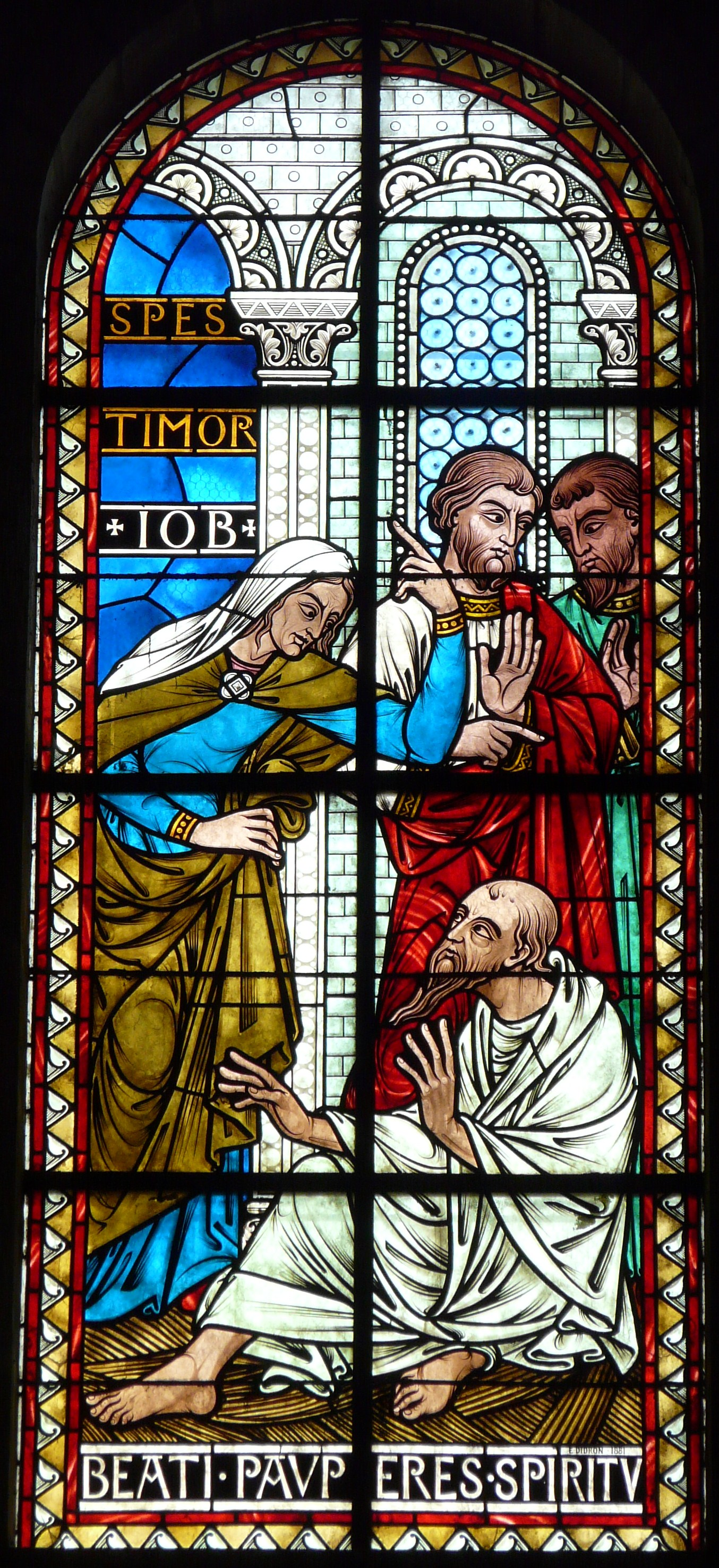
Stained glass inside the Cathédrale Saint-Front de Périgueux

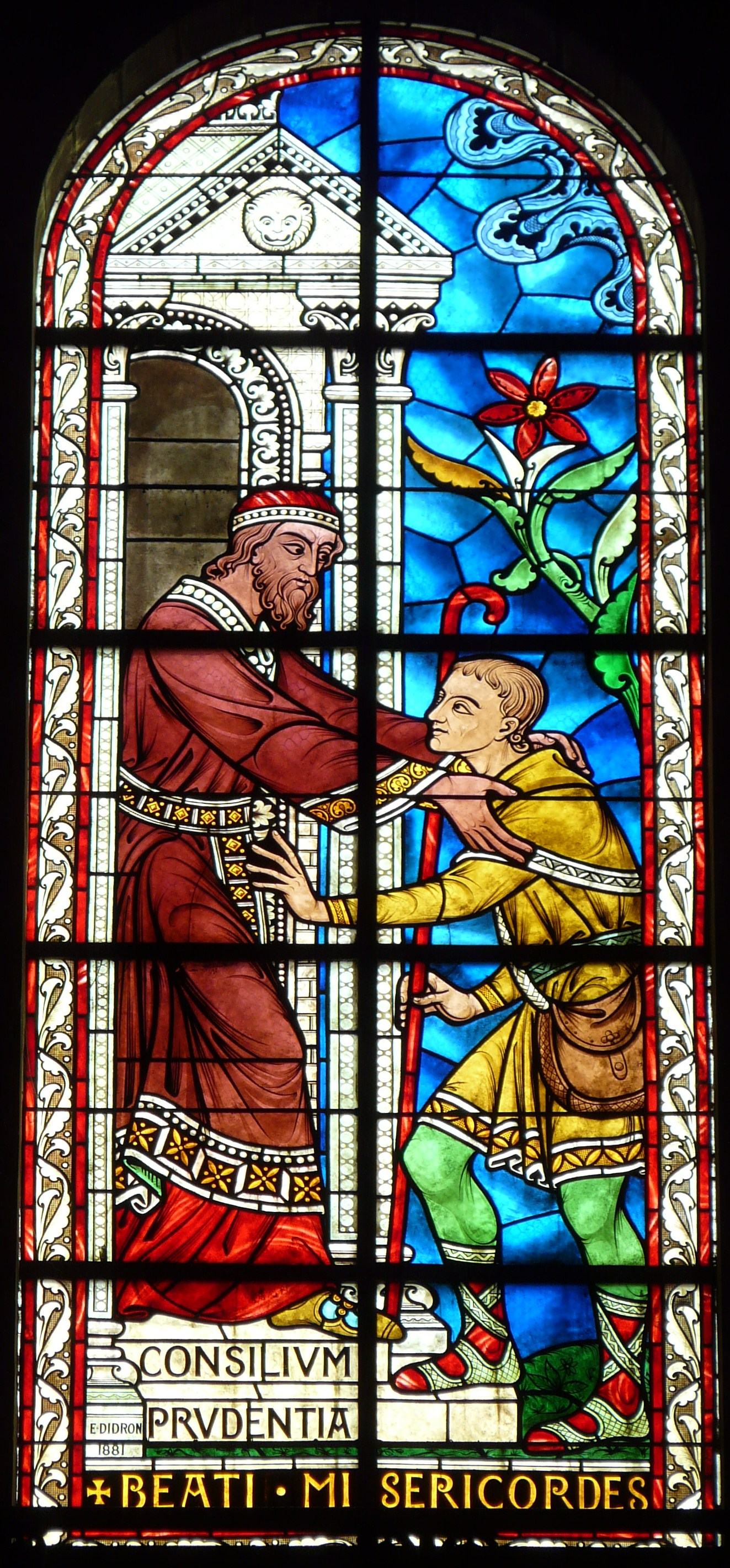
Stained glass inside the Cathédrale Saint-Front de Périgueux

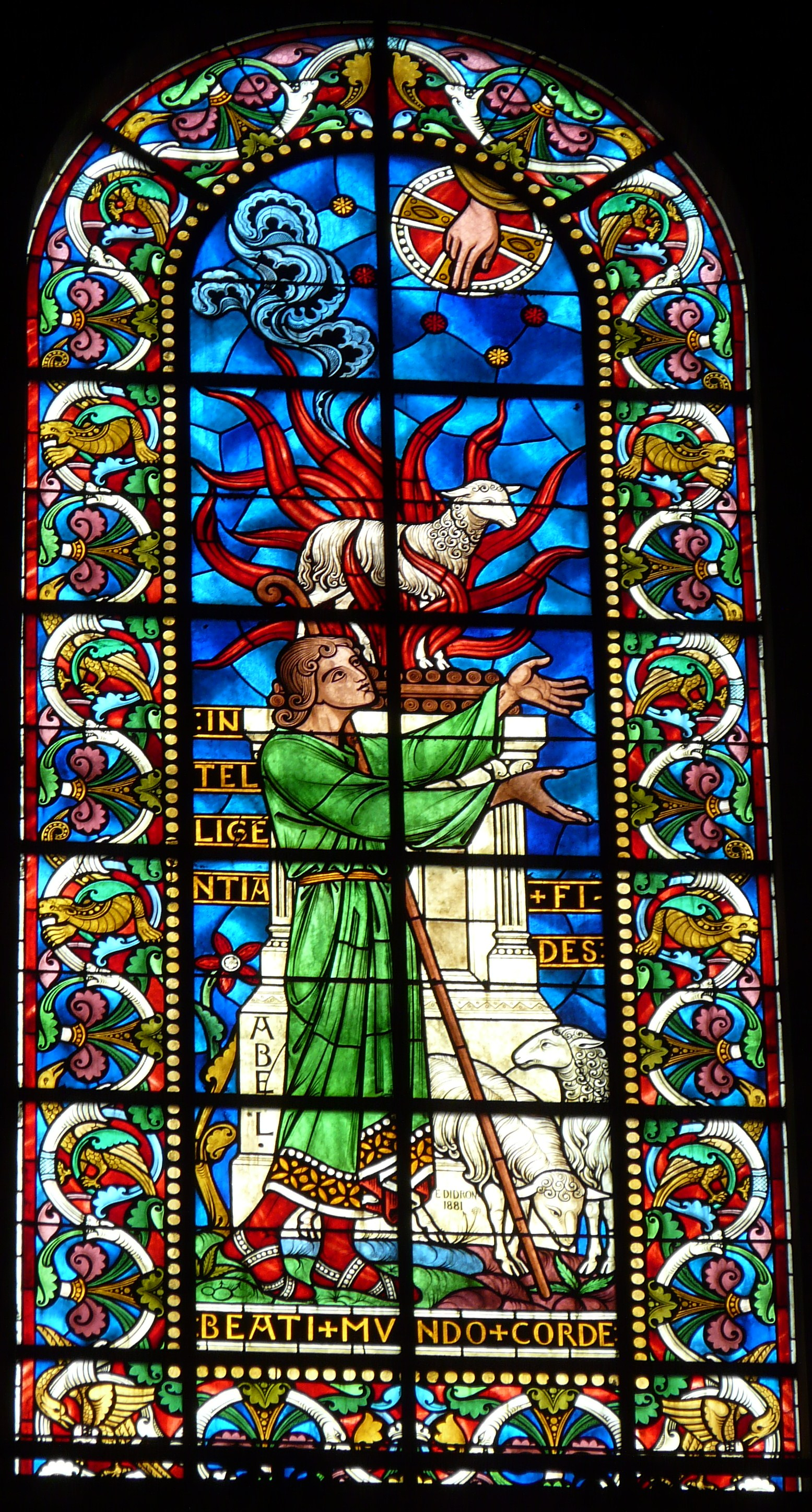
Stained glass inside the Cathédrale Saint-Front de Périgueux

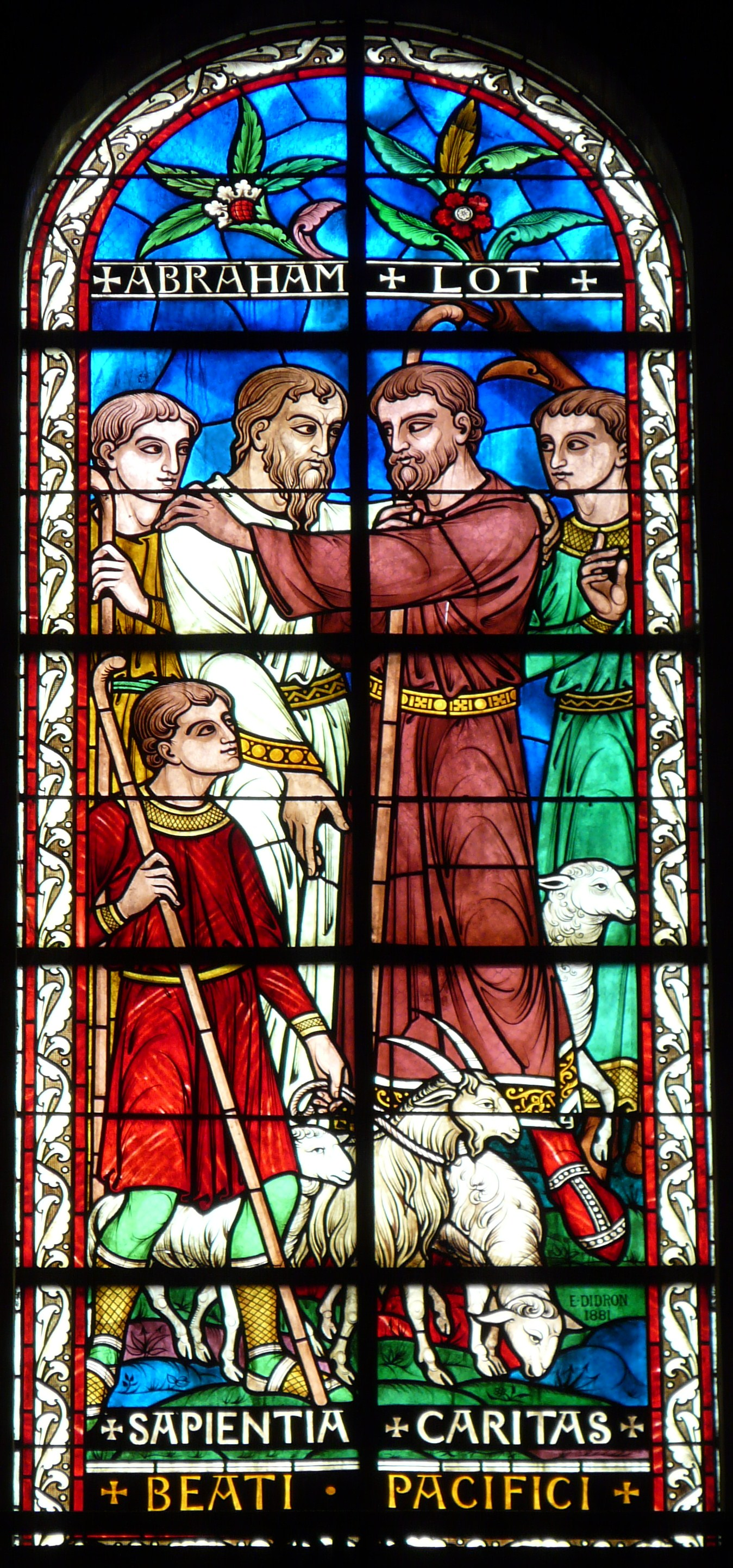
Stained glass inside the Cathédrale Saint-Front de Périgueux

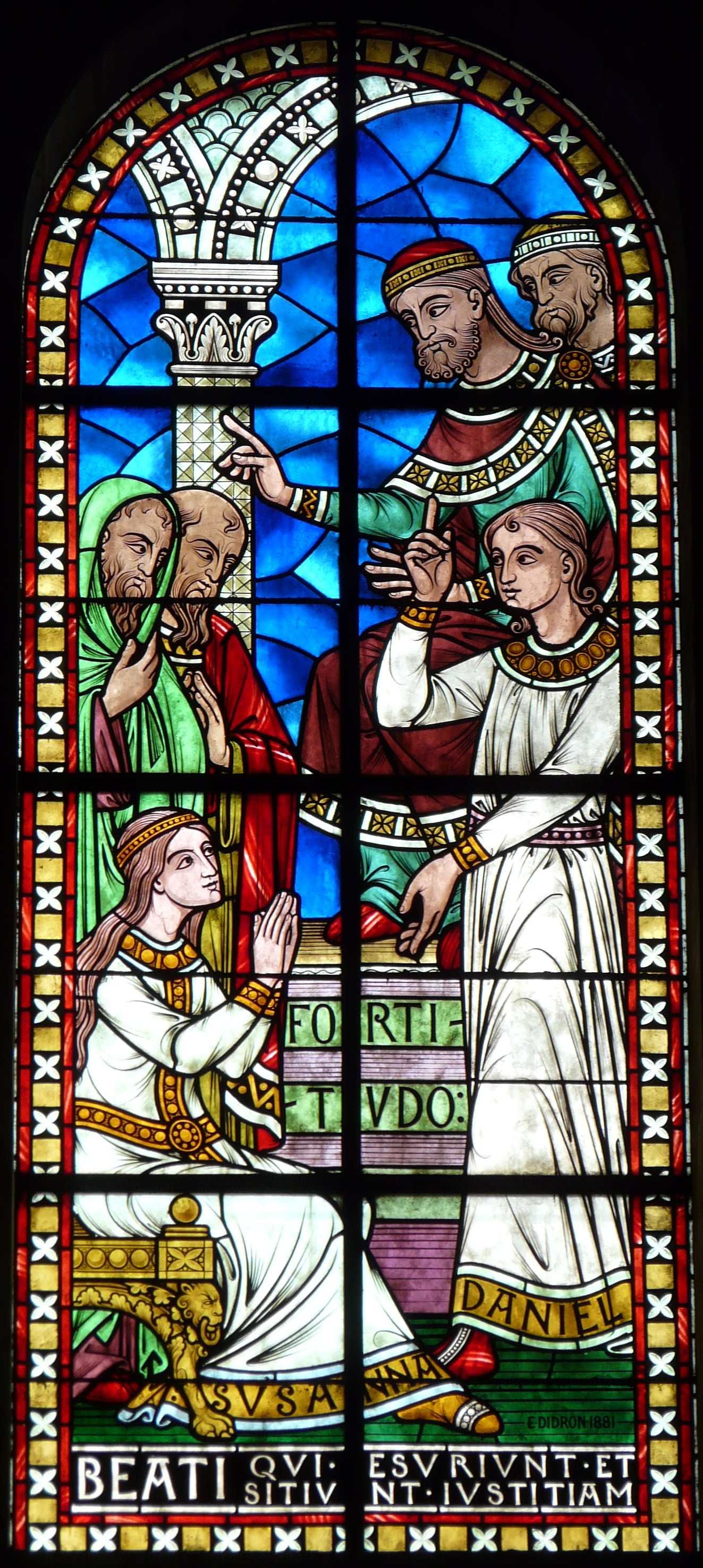
Stained glass inside the Cathédrale Saint-Front de Périgueux
