= Quai de la Gare station =

Metro station in Paris, France

Quai de la Gare
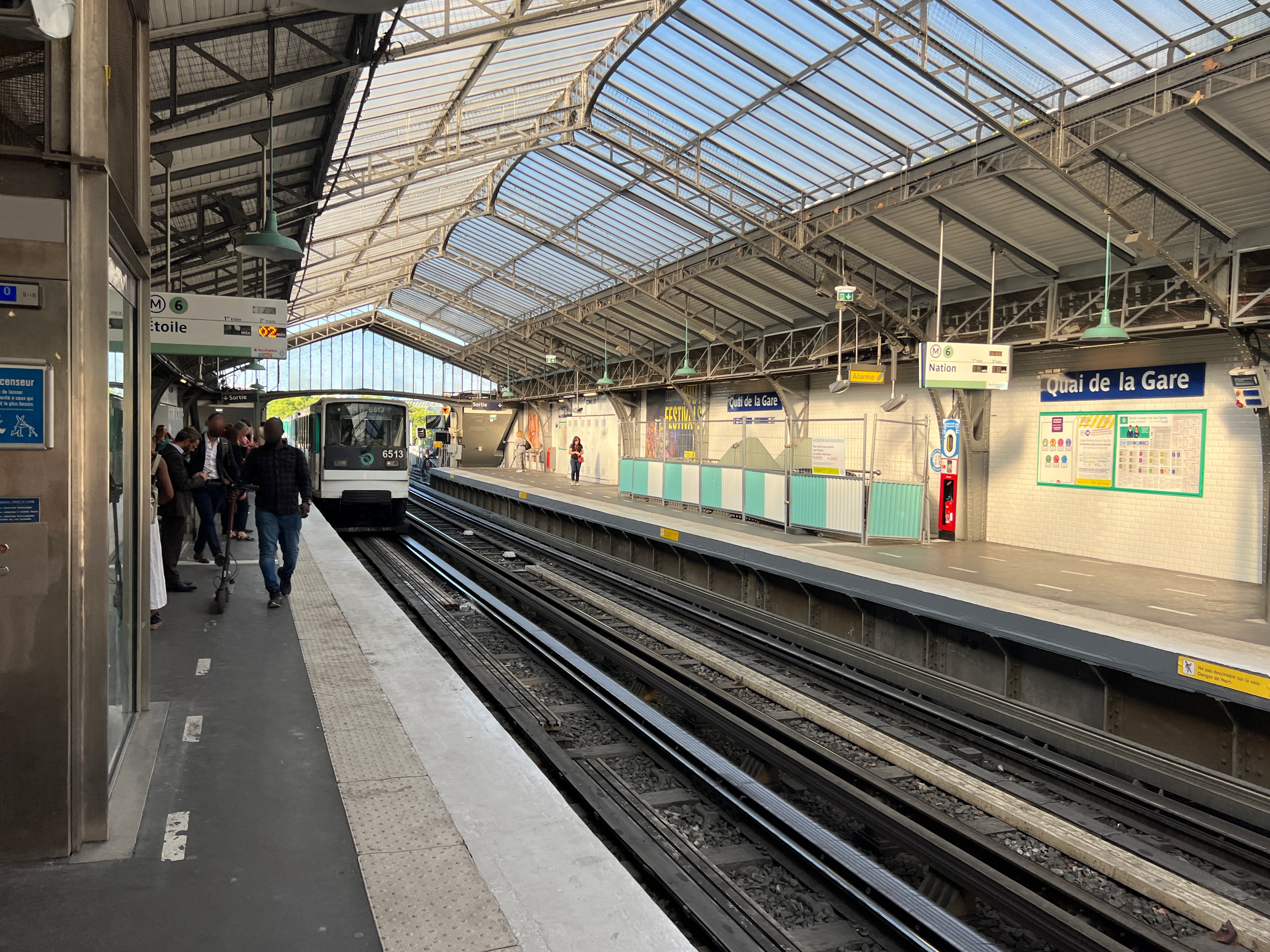
- MP 73 train at Quai de la Gare

General information
- Location: 13th arrondissement of Paris; Île-de-France; France
- Coordinates: 48°50′13″N 2°22′22″E
- System: Paris Métro station
- Owner: RATP
- Operator: RATP

Construction
- Accessible: Yes

Other information
- Fare zone: 1

History
- Opened: 1 March 1909

Services
Preceding station	Paris Metro	Following station
Chevaleret towards Charles de Gaulle–Étoile	Line 6	Bercy towards Nation
Location
- Location within Paris

Quai de la Gare (French pronunciation: [kɛ d(ə) la ɡaʁ]) is a station on Line 6 of the Paris Métro. It is located at the intersection of the Quai de la Gare and Boulevard Vincent Auriol, in the 13th arrondissement.

== History ==
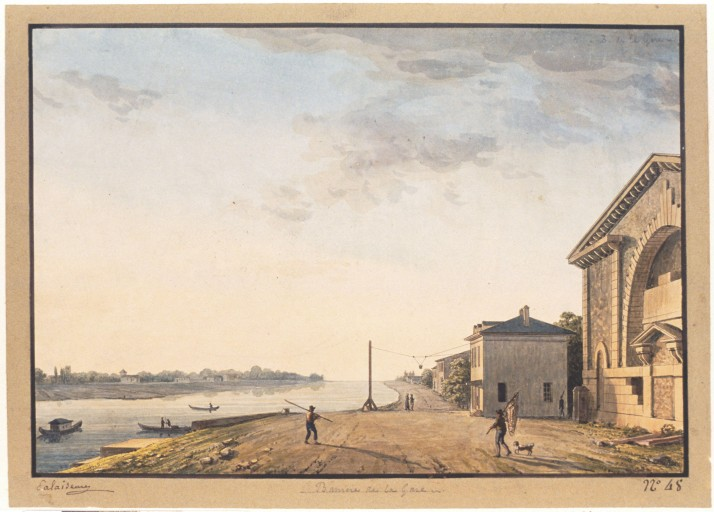
Barrière de la Gare, a gate in the Wall of the Farmers-General once stood nearby

The station opened on 1 March 1909 with the opening of the original section of Line 6 from Place d'Italie to Nation (although part of Line 5—some dating back to 2 October 1900—was incorporated into Line 6 on 12 October 1942). It is named after the Quai de la Gare on the Rive Gauche of the Seine, which was a wharf opened in 1770 and serving the Pitié-Salpêtrière Hospital. Nearby was the location of the Barrière de la Gare, a gate built for the collection of taxation as part of the Wall of the Farmers-General; the gate was built between 1784 and 1788 and demolished in 1819.

As part of the RATP's Renouveau du metro program, the station was completely renovated in the 2000s. In 2021, attendance is gradually rising, with 1,735,465 passengers entering this station, placing it in the 202nd position of metro stations for its usage.

== Passenger services ==
=== Access ===
The station has two accesses leading to either side of the central median of Boulevard Vincent-Auriol:

- Access 1 - "Avenue de France" located to the right of nos. 11 and 12 of the boulevard;
- Access 2 - "Pont de Bercy" facing nos. 1 and 2 of the boulevard.

Each opens onto a communal area under the viaduct from where access to the platforms is by means of fixed stairs, escalators, or elevators.

=== Station layout ===
Platform level	Side platform, doors will open on the right
Platform level	Westbound	← toward Charles de Gaulle–Étoile (Chevaleret)
Platform level	Eastbound	toward Nation (Bercy) →
Platform level	Side platform, doors will open on the right

1F	Mezzanine for platform connection

Street Level

=== Platforms ===
Quai de la Gare is an elevated station of standard configuration. It has two platforms separated by the metro tracks, all established in a very slight curve and covered with a glass roof. The vertical walls are covered with bevelled white ceramic tiles on the inside, and bricks layered in geometric patterns on the outside. The advertising frames are made of white ceramic and the name of the station is inscribed in Parisine font on enamelled plaques. The Motte style seats are white and arranged on convex benches covered with flat white ceramic tiles. The lighting is semi-direct, projected on the ground by blue ceiling lights, on the walls by partially concealed tubes and on the frame by blue light projectors. Access is via the eastern end.

=== Bus connections ===
The station is served by lines 61, 71, 89, 215 and 325 of the RATP Bus Network and, at night, by lines N131 and N133 of the Noctilien bus network.

== Nearby ==
Nearby are the Ministry of the Economy and Finance and AccorHotels Arena, although best served by the next station towards Nation, Bercy, which Line 6 reaches by crossing the Pont de Bercy.

== Gallery ==
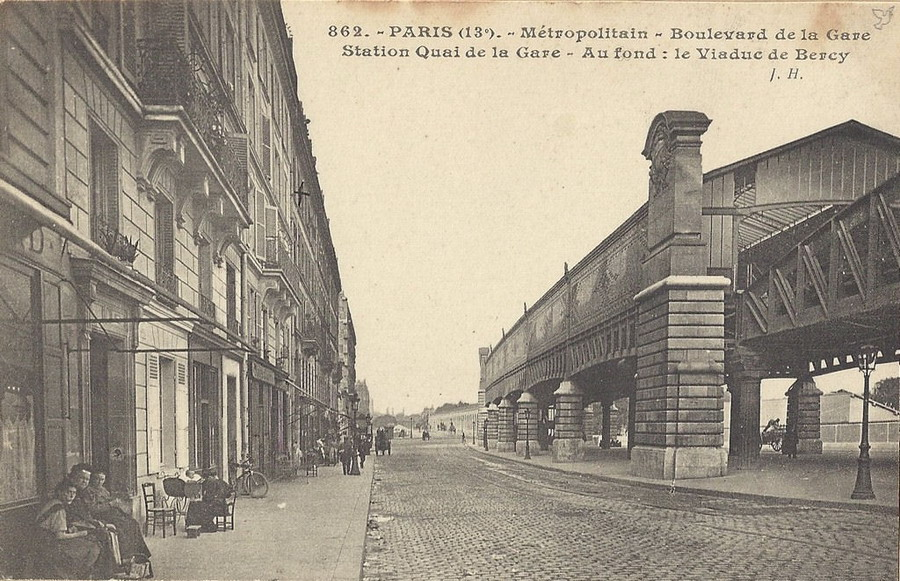
Quai de la Gare station at the beginning of the 20th century
