= Chevaleret station =

Paris Métro station

Chevaleret
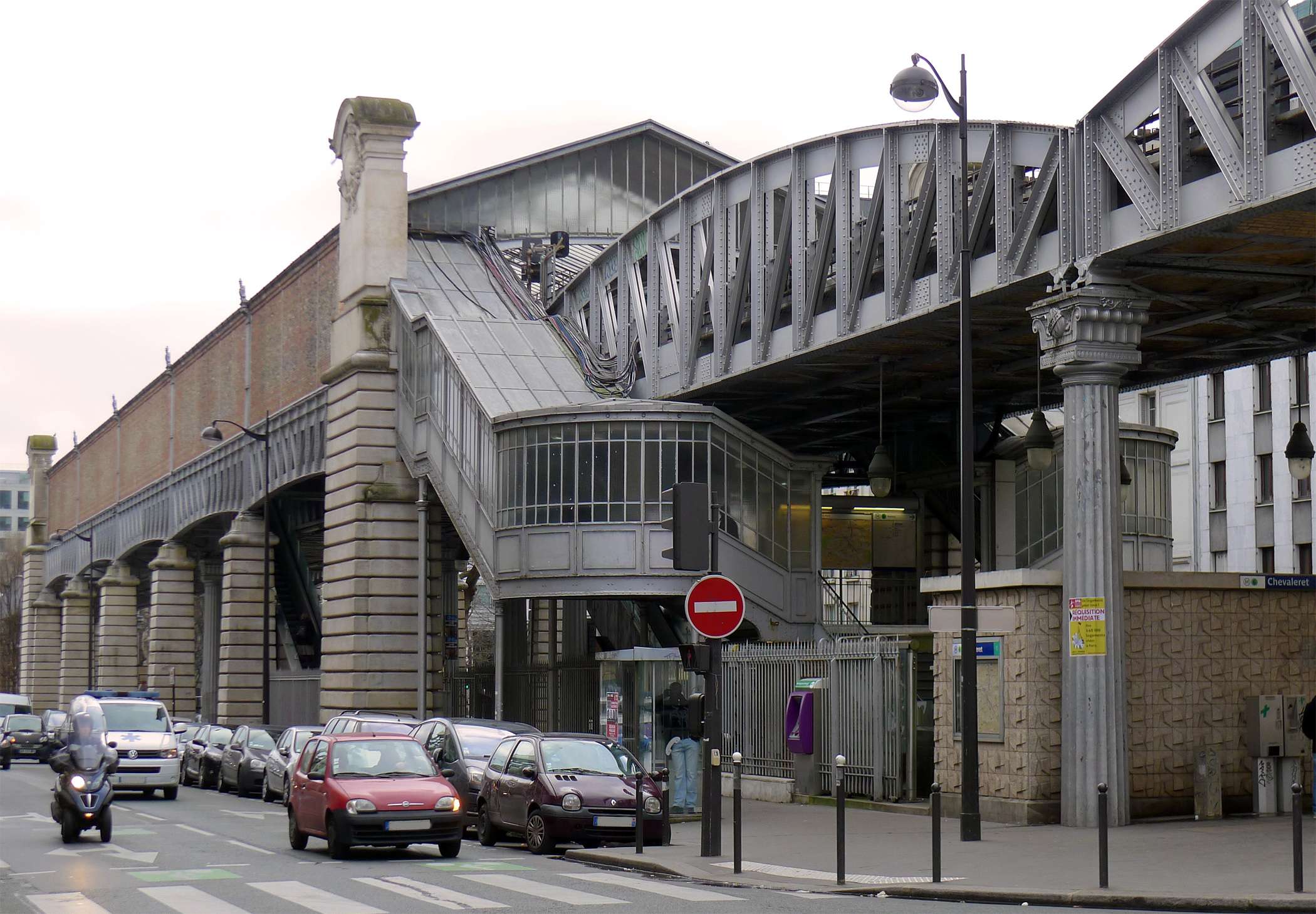

General information
- Location: 13th arrondissement of Paris; Île-de-France; France
- Coordinates: 48°50′06″N 2°22′05″E
- System: Paris Métro station
- Owner: RATP
- Operator: RATP

Construction
- Structure type: Elevated

Other information
- Fare zone: 1

History
- Opened: 1 March 1909

Services
Preceding station	Paris Metro	Following station
Nationale towards Charles de Gaulle–Étoile	Line 6	Quai de la Gare towards Nation
Location
- Location within Paris

Chevaleret (French pronunciation: [ʃəvalʁɛ]) is an elevated station of the Paris Métro serving line 6 at the intersection of the Rue du Chevaleret and the Boulevard Vincent Auriol in the 13th arrondissement.

== History ==
The station opened on 1 March 1909 with the opening of the original section of line 6 from Place d'Italie to Nation (although part of line 5—some dating back to 2 October 1900—was incorporated into line 6 on 12 October 1942). It is named after the Rue de Chevaleret, a street that already existed in 1670, and was named after the locality, which in turn was probably named after its owner.

As part of the RATP Renouveau du métro program, the station was completely renovated in 2003.

== Passenger services ==
=== Access ===
The station has two accesses leading to either side of the central median of Boulevard Vincent-Auriol:

- Access 1 - "Rue Bruant - La Pitié-Salpêtrière" located on the north side opposite the Institut de Cardiologie de l'Hôpital de la Salpêtrière, at no. 50 boulevard;
- Access 2 - "Rue du Chevaleret" located on the south side to the right of no. 79 of the boulevard.

Each opens onto a communal area under the viaduct from where access to the platforms is by means of stairs or escalators.

=== Station layout ===
Platform level	Side platform, doors will open on the right
Platform level	toward Charles de Gaulle – Étoile	← toward Charles de Gaulle – Étoile (Nationale)
Platform level	toward Nation	toward Nation (Quai de la Gare) →
Platform level	Side platform, doors will open on the right

1F	Mezzanine for platform connection

Street Level

=== Platforms ===
Chevaleret is an elevated station of standard configuration. It has two platforms separated by the metro tracks, all covered with a glass roof in the style of the canopies of the stations of the time. The vertical walls are covered with bevelled white ceramic tiles on the inside, and bricks drawing geometric patterns on the outside. The advertising frames are made of white ceramic and the name of the station is inscribed in Parisine font on enamelled plaques. The Motte style seats are red in colour. The lighting is semi-direct, projected on the ground by blue ceiling lights, on the wall by partially concealed tubes and on the frame by blue light projectors. Access is via the western end.

=== Bus connections ===
The station is served by line 61 of the RATP Bus Network.

== Nearby ==
Nearby are the Pitié-Salpêtrière Hospital and the Ministry of Finance.
