= Nationale station =

Metro station in Paris, France

Nationale
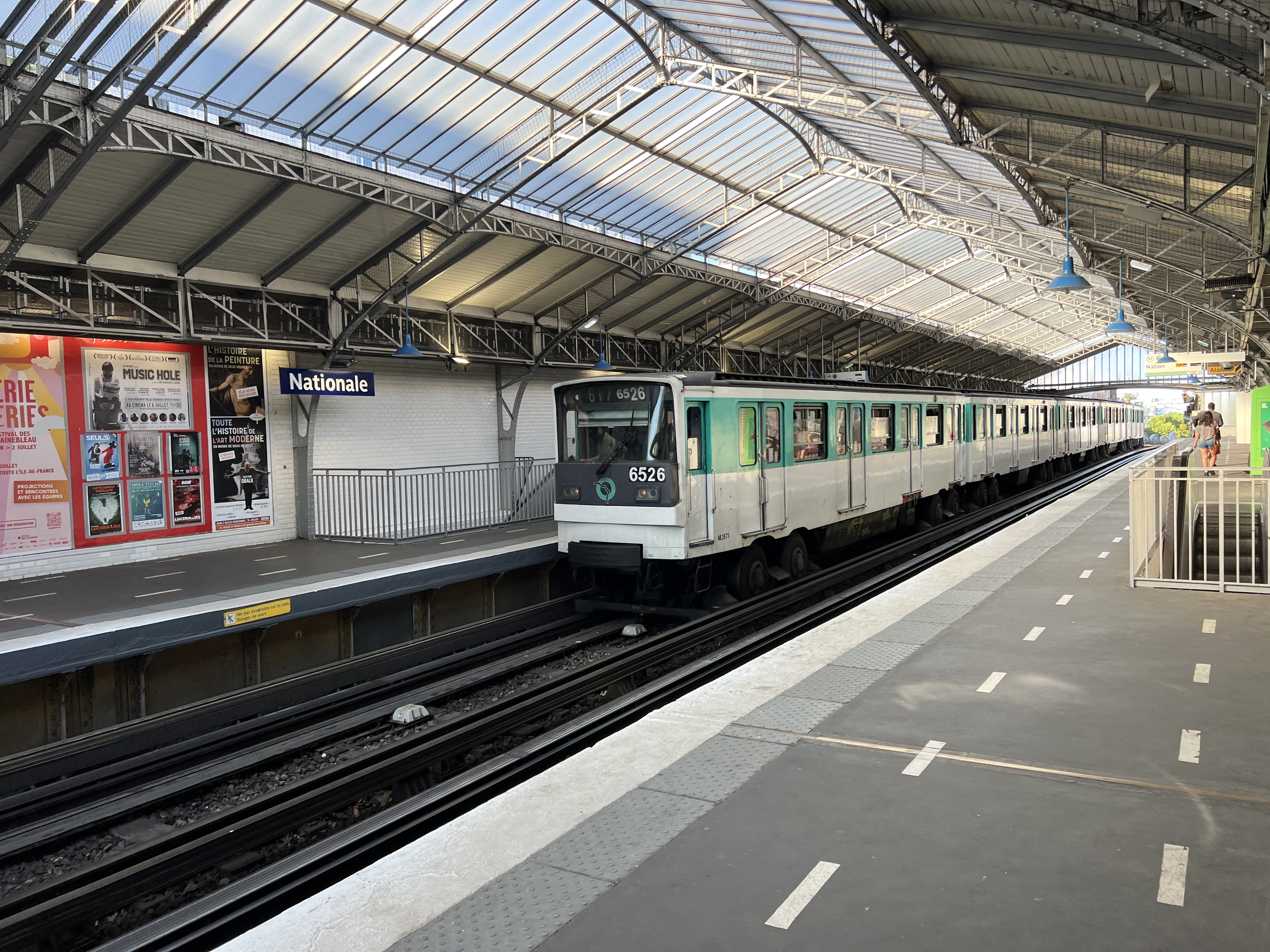

General information
- Location: 13th arrondissement of Paris; Île-de-France; France
- Coordinates: 48°49′59″N 2°21′46″E
- System: Paris Métro station
- Owner: RATP
- Operator: RATP

Other information
- Fare zone: 1

History
- Opened: 1 March 1909

Services
Preceding station	Paris Metro	Following station
Place d'Italie towards Charles de Gaulle–Étoile	Line 6	Chevaleret towards Nation
Location
- Location within Paris

Nationale (French pronunciation: [nɑsjɔnal]) is an elevated station of the Paris Métro serving line 6 at the intersection of the Rue Nationale and the Boulevard Vincent Auriol in the 13th arrondissement.

== Location ==
Elevated above ground, the station overlooks the central median of Boulevard Vincent-Auriol, between Rue Jeanne-d'Arc and Rue Nationale. Oriented on a northeast/southwest axis, it is positioned between the stations Place d'Italie and Chevaleret (the former being underground).

== History ==
The station opened on 1 March 1909 with the opening of the original section of line 6 from Nation to Place d'Italie. (Line 6 was extended from Place d’Italie to Etoile in 1942 by incorporating part of line 5.) The station is on the site of the Barrière-d’Ivry, a gate in the Wall of the Farmers-General, where taxes were collected on goods brought into the city from 1818 to 1860. It is named after the nearby Rue Nationale, the former Rue des Deux Moulins which was renamed after the Revolution of 1848 in commemoration of the National Guard. This was a middle-class militia created on 13 July 1789 for the maintenance of law and order in Paris. Next day, it took part in the storming of the Bastille.

As part of the RATP Renouveau du metroprogram, the station was completely renovated by 5 May 2004. In 2021, attendance is gradually rising, with 1,320,290 passengers entering this station, placing it in the 251st position of metro stations for its usage out of 304 stations.

== Passenger services ==
=== Access ===
The station has a single access called "Boulevard Vincent-Auriol", leading to the central median of this boulevard to the right of Nos. 124 and 143. It opens onto a communal area under the viaduct from where access to the platforms is by means of stairs or escalators.

=== Station layout ===
Platform level	Side platform, doors will open on the right
Platform level	toward Charles de Gaulle – Étoile	← toward Charles de Gaulle – Étoile (Place d'Italie)
Platform level	toward Nation	toward Nation (Chevaleret) →
Platform level	Side platform, doors will open on the right

1F	Mezzanine for platform connection

Street Level

=== Platforms ===
Nationale is an elevated station of a standard configuration. It has two platforms separated by the metro tracks, all covered with a glass roof in the style of the canopies of the stations of the time. The vertical walls are covered with bevelled white ceramic tiles on the inside, and bricks drawing geometric patterns on the outside. The advertising frames are made of white ceramic and the name of the station is inscribed in Parisine font on enamelled plates attached to the metal frame. The platforms are equipped with wooden slatted benches. The lighting is semi-direct, projected on the ground by blue ceiling lights, on the wall by partially concealed tubes and on the frame by blue light projectors. Access is via the western end.

=== Bus connections ===
The station is served by lines 27 and 61 of the RATP Bus Network, and, at night, by line N31 of the Noctilien network.
