= Le Bus Direct =

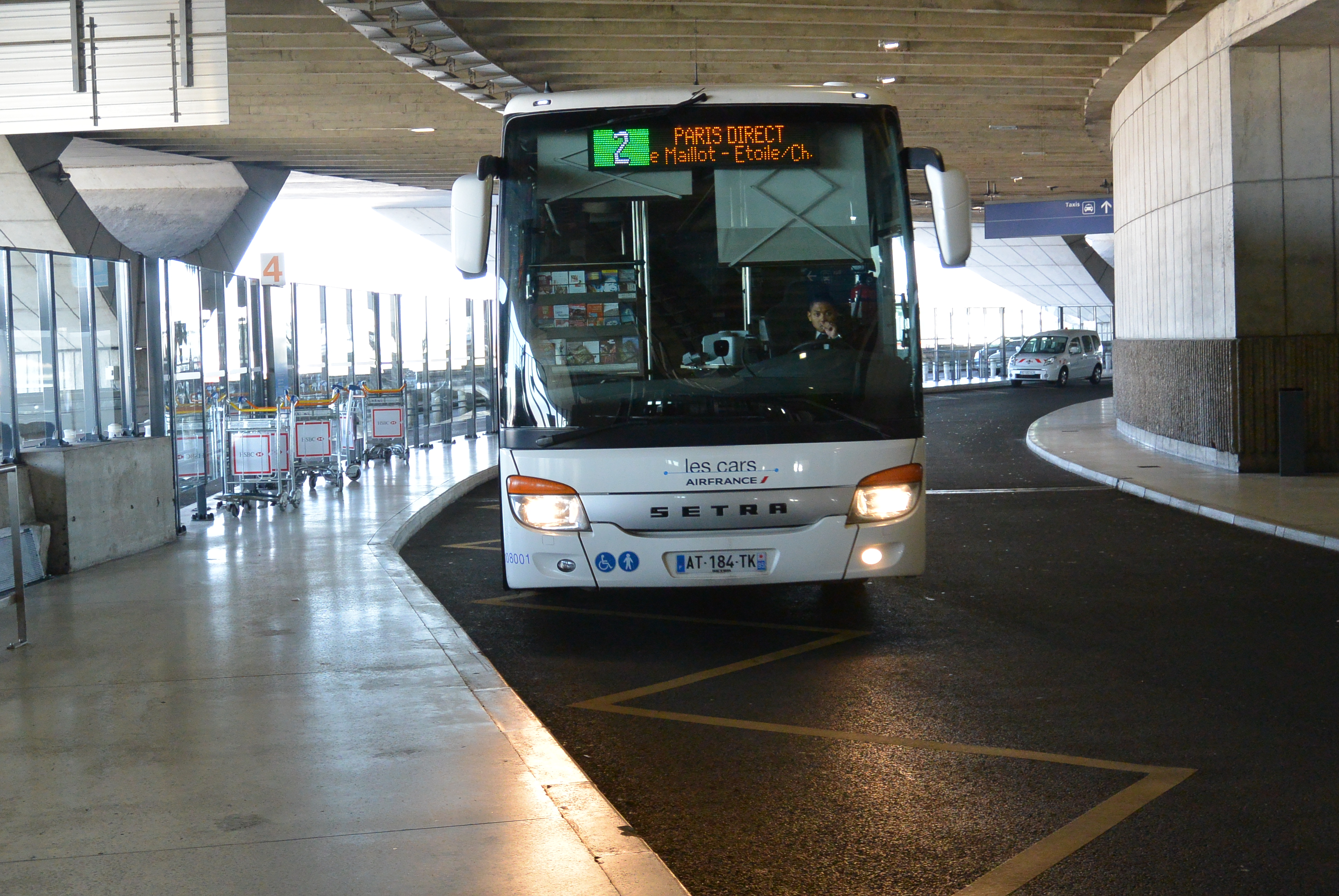
- Les Cars Air France coach at Charles de Gaulle Airport
- Parent: Groupe ADP
- Commenced operation: 1930
- Ceased operation: April 1, 2020
- Headquarters: Paris
- Service area: Île-de-France Region
- Service type: Airport transfer
- Routes: 4
- Destinations: Paris; Charles de Gaulle Airport; Orly Airport
- Operator: Keolis
- Website: www.lebusdirect.com/en/

Le Bus Direct (formerly Les Cars Air France) was a network of express bus routes operating between Paris and the two major airports in the region (Charles de Gaulle Airport and Orly Airport) and a bus route that connected the two airports. The service has its roots in similar bus routes that started in 1930. The service was terminated on 1 April 2020 as a result of the drop in passengers due to the impact of the COVID-19 pandemic on aviation.

== History ==
The service traces its history to a service established by Lignes Aériennes Farman (English: Farman Air Lines) which offered travelers coaches between Paris and Paris–Le Bourget Airport. The service was continued by Farman's successor airlines, Société Générale des Transports Aériens (SGTA) and Air France, which renamed the service "Les Cars Air France" 'Air France Coaches'.

At the beginning of the service, all passengers were checked-in for their flight at a terminal in Paris and shuttled out to the airfield in coaches. In 1946, the Aérogare des Invalides air terminal opened in Paris along with the Orly Airport.

This continued until 1961, when check-in desks were centralized at the airport. After the 1960s, Air France retained its coach service from Paris to the airports and opened up the service to any passengers, even if they weren't flying Air France.

On 12 May 2016, Keolis began running the service and it was renamed "Le Bus Direct", and connected with the Paris Aéroport brand. At that time, the Invalides terminal was abandoned in favor of other stops around the Paris area.

The service was terminated on 1 April 2020 as a result of the drop in passengers due to the impact of the COVID-19 pandemic on aviation.

== Routes ==
Before the termination of the service, four routes were operated by Le Bus Direct:

=== Route 1: Orly Airport – Paris (Étoile) ===
- Routing: Orly Airport Terminal 4 – Orly Airport Terminals 1/2/3 – Gare Montparnasse – Trocadéro – Etoile/Champs-Elysées
- Travel Time: 20 to 60 minutes
- Frequency: every 20 minutes
- Hours of operation: 04:50 to 23:35

=== Route 2: CDG Airport – Paris (Eiffel Tower) ===
- Routing: CDG Airport Terminals 2E/2F – CDG Airport Terminals 2A/2C/2D – CDG Airport Terminal 1 – Porte Maillot/Palais des Congrès – Etoile/Champs-Elysées – Eiffel Tower
- Travel Time: 45 to 60 minutes
- Frequency: every 30 minutes
- Hours of operation: 05:30 to 23:30

=== Route 3 CDG Airport – Orly Airport ===
- Routing: Orly Airport Terminal 4 – Orly Airport Terminals 1/2/3 – CDG Airport Terminals 2A/2C/2D – CDG Airport Terminals 2E/2F
- Travel Time: 70 to 80 minutes
- Frequency: every 25 to 40 minutes
- Hours of operation: 06:10 to 21:50

=== Route 4 CDG Airport – Paris (Gare Montparnasse) ===
- Routing: CDG Airport Terminals 2E/2F – CDG Airport Terminals 2A/2C/2D – CDG Airport Terminal 1 – Gare de Lyon – Gare Montparnasse
- Travel Time: 40 to 80 minutes
- Frequency: every 30 minutes
- Hours of operation: 05:45 to 20:45
