= Paris Aéroport =

French subsidiary of Groupe ADP

- Logo since April 2016
- Current owner: Groupe ADP
- Country: France
- Introduced: April 2016
- Markets: Transportation, aviation
- Website: parisaeroport.fr

Paris Aéroport (French pronunciation: [paʁi aeʁɔpɔʁ]), formerly Aéroports de Paris (ADP), is the passenger brand subsidiary of Groupe ADP which operated the airports of Paris and its region, including Paris–Charles de Gaulle, Paris–Orly and Paris–Le Bourget. The company is headquartered at Charles de Gaulle Airport, Tremblay-en-France, Seine-Saint-Denis, in the Paris metropolitan area.

== Background ==
The brand Paris Aéroport has been created on 14 April 2016 as part of a programme called Connect 2020. The plan involved creation of two new brands. One to operate the 3 Parisian international airports (Orly, Le Bourget, Charles de Gaulle) under the brand Paris Aéroport. And all other airport-related subsidiaries were gathered into one institutional brand, Groupe ADP.

== Description ==
Paris Aéroport replaced the Air France bus shuttles from the Parisian airports to the capital with its own Le Bus Direct bus shuttles fleet and added more stop points throughout Paris.

Paris Aéroport, as of 2017, includes restaurants run by chefs Guy Martin, Thierry Marx, Michel Rostang, and Gilles Epié.

In the summer of 2016, Paris Aéroport launched yoga classes in its boarding terminals, seeking to reduce stress associated with flying.

== Evolution of traffic ==
Traffic in Paris Aéroport
Airport	2013	2014	2015	2016	2017
Charles de Gaulle Airport	62,052,917	63,813,756	65,766,986	65,933,145	69,471,442
Orly Airport	28,274,154	28,862,586	29,664,993	31,237,865	32,042,475
Le Bourget Airport	55,471	55,519	54,688	53,599	52,935
Total	90,382,542	92,731,861	95,486,667	97,224,609	101,566,852

== See also ==
- Groupe ADP
- Paris-Charles de Gaulle Airport
- Paris-Orly Airport
- Paris - Le Bourget Airport
