= Paris Metro Line 6 =

Subway route in the French capital

Line 6
- Paris Metro Line 6
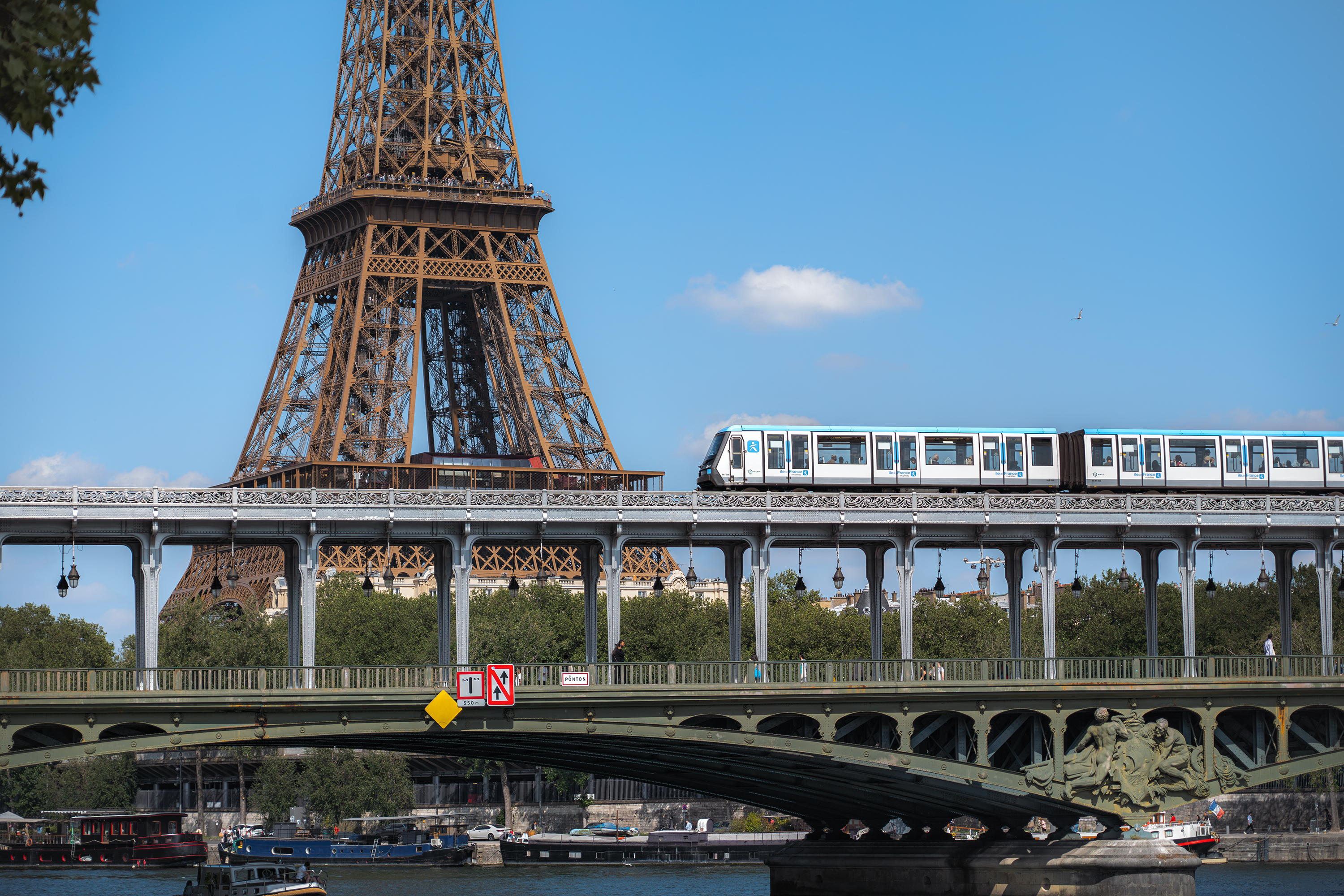
- MP 89 stock train crosses the Seine via Pont de Bir-Hakeim

Overview
- Locale: 1 commune
- Termini: Charles de Gaulle–Étoile; Nation
- Connecting lines: Paris Metro Paris Metro Line 1 Paris Metro Line 2 Paris Metro Line 4 Paris Metro Line 5 Paris Metro Line 7 Paris Metro Line 8 Paris Metro Line 9 Paris Metro Line 10 Paris Metro Line 12 Paris Metro Line 13 Paris Metro Line 14 RER RER A RER B Transilien Transilien Line N (Paris-Montparnasse)
- Stations: 28

Service
- System: Paris Métro
- Operator: RATP
- Rolling stock: MP 89 CC (47 trains as of 12 October 2026)
- Ridership: 100,700,000 (avg. per year); 9th/16

History
- Opened: 1 March 1909; 117 years ago

Technical
- Line length: 13.6 km (8.5 mi)
- Track gauge: 1,435 mm (4 ft 8 1/2 in) standard gauge
- Electrification: 750 V DC third rail
- Conduction system: Conductor
- Average inter-station distance: 504 m (1,654 ft)

Line 6 is one of the sixteen currently open lines of the Paris Métro rapid transit system. Following a semi-circular route through the southern half of the city above boulevards built along the path of the former Fermiers généraux wall of 1784–1860, it runs between Charles de Gaulle–Étoile in the west and Nation in the east, with both termini connecting to the historical line 1. A significant part of the route is on elevated tracks, including both sections of the line crossing the Seine.

The rails and stations of today's Line 6 were opened between 1900 and 1909, but took their current configuration only in 1942. The stretch between Étoile and Place d'Italie opened between 1900 and 1906 as Line 2 Sud. In 1907, it was made part of Line 5. The section between Place d'Italie and Nation opened in 1909 as Line 6. In 1942, the Étoile – Place d'Italie section of Line 5 was transferred to line 6, creating today's Line 6 route.

The line is 13.6 km (8.5 mi) in length, of which 6.1 km (3.8 mi) are above ground, and has been equipped with rubber-tyred rolling stock since 1974. The line is considered one of the most pleasant lines on the Métro, due to its numerous views, sometimes exceptional, of many of Paris' most famous landmarks and monuments. With slightly more than 100 million riders in 2004, it is the sixth busiest line of the network.

== Chronology ==
- 2 October 1900: The section between Étoile and Trocadéro opened as an extension of line 1.
- 6 November 1903: The line was extended from Trocadéro to Passy and became known as line 2 Sud (2 South).
- 24 April 1906: Line 2 Sud was extended from Passy to Place d'Italie.
- 14 October 1907: Line 2 Sud was incorporated into line 5.
- 1 March 1909: Line 6 was opened between Place d'Italie and Nation.
- 12 October 1942: The Étoile – Place d'Italie section of line 5 was transferred to line 6.
- 1974: The rails were converted for rubber-tyred trains in order to make the tracks quieter on the line's elevated sections.
- 12 January 2023: Cascading of MP 73 to MP 89CC rolling stock begins.

=== Le Circulaire sud ===
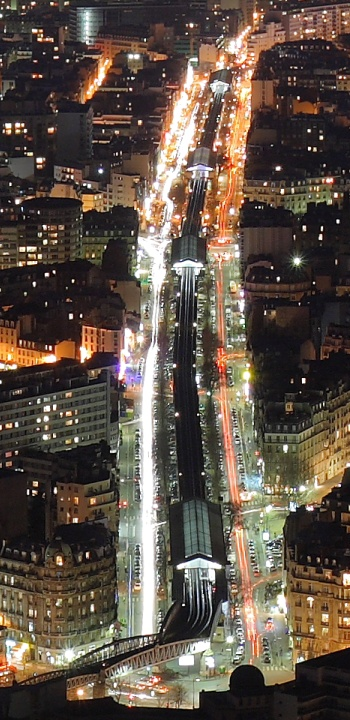
A view of an elevated section of line 6 at night, from Tour Montparnasse.

Initially, the planners of the Métro envisaged a loop line similar to the Circle line of the London Underground that followed the route of the Exterior Boulevards. However, the anticipated difficulties of operating such a long line resulted in a separation of the circle into two parts, a north circulaire and a south circulaire, the circle divided where it intersected with Line 1 (Étoile and Nation).

The northern circulaire, Line 2, opened in 1903. At the same time, the branch of Line 1 from Étoile to Trocadéro that had opened in 1900 to service the World Exposition was extended southward to Passy, and became the southern circulaire, Line 2 Sud, but only allowed four-car trains. On 24 April 1906, Line 2 Sud was extended to Place d'Italie. As connecting the Paris railway stations was an objective for the Métro, an initial plan was to then run the southern circulaire from Place d'Italie to Gare d'Austerlitz, to Gare de Lyon, and from there operate along Line 1 to close the loop at Nation. But it was later decided to merge Line 2 Sud with Line 5, which was done in October 1907. Line 5 now ran trains from Étoile to Gare Montparnasse to Gare d'Austerlitz and thence to Gare du Nord. This consolidation eliminated the 2 Sud designation.

=== Line 6 ===
The Line 5 consolidation resulted in construction of a new line to complete the circle: Line 6, between Place d'Italie and Nation via Bercy. Infrastructure works were completed by 1906, but the CMP (La compagnie du chemin de fer métropolitain de Paris) was in no hurry to open what was perceived as a low-profit stretch of track. Prodded by the City of Paris, the CMP opened Line 6 on 1 March 1909.

As a result of aerial bombardments during World War I, defensive measures were taken for the elevated rapid transit lines. Trains were no longer lit at night from February to July 1918. As a result of the reduced lighting, however, trains became incredibly dark when they went underground, resulting in complaints from passengers and employees. The CMP was authorised to make electrical and lighting changes.

In 1931, to facilitate access from the southern part of the city to the Colonial Exhibition at the Bois de Vincennes, Line 6 temporarily took over the old LIne 2 Sud part of Line 5, creating a line from Étoile to Nation. After the Exhibition closed, the old service pattern resumed.

The Line 6 route took its current form on 6 October 1942, when the Place d'Italie - Étoile section of Line 5 was again transferred to Line 6. It was judged that the new extension of Line 5 north to Pantin made that line too long. With Paris again subject to air attack, it was also desirable to separate the underground and elevated sections of Line 5.

Work on the length of the current line 6 was not particularly difficult, apart from land stabilisation around Denfert-Rochereau due to disused underground stone quarries, and the occasional sewer displacements. On the other hand, the crossings of the Seine were trickier. In the west, the construction from 1903 to 1906 of a viaduct over the Pont de Passy (renamed Pont de Bir-Hakeim in 1949) gave way to another project unrelated to the Métro. The original bridge, built in 1878, was replaced with one made of metal supporting the railway viaduct above. In the east, another bridge had to be built above the Pont de Bercy. Originally finished in 1864, it was widened by 5.5 m (18 ft) in order to accommodate the Métro and is the only viaduct in the system made of stone. Both the overpasses and underground stations were designed similarly to those of Line 2 Nord, although elevated stations on the southern circulaire are fully covered with side-walls made of brick, not glass.

=== Rubber tyre conversion ===
A change in Line 6's operation occurred during the 1970s: Kléber station was expanded to four tracks with two island platforms, a rare arrangement in the Paris Métro, and converted to the line's control terminal, with Étoile acting as a simple turn-around stop.

After doing the same to Lines 1, 4, and 11, the RATP decided in 1971 to convert Line 6 to rubber-tyres for the sake of noise and vibration reduction not only to passengers but also residents near the elevated portions of the line. Work began the next year and finished in May 1974. During this time, a temporary yard was created with 810 m (2,660 ft) of track to facilitate vehicle movement. Simultaneously, the line was equipped with a central control station.

The MP 73 rolling stock quickly replaced the old Sprague-Thomson during the month of July 1974. Unlike the MP 59 cars which also have rubber tyres, the MP 73 stock has grooved ones for better adhesion on the long stretches of elevated track; the rails are ribbed for the same reason. No adhesion failures have been reported since the switchover, even in heavy rain.

From 2023, with the ongoing modernization and upcoming automation of Line 4, the MP 73 are being replaced by renovated and shortened MP 89CC railcars. They were fully retired in 2026.

== Route and stations ==

=== Renamed stations ===
Date	Old name	New name	Notes
15 October 1907	Avenue de Suffren	Rue de Sèvres	then on line 5
11 March 1910	Montparnasse	Avenue du Maine	then on line 5
1 November 1913	Rue de Sèvres	Sèvres – Lecourbe	then on line 5
30 June 1933	Avenue du Maine	Bienvenüe	then on line 5
1 March 1937	Saint-Mandé	Picpus	
12 July 1939	Charenton	Dugommier	
6 October 1942	Bienvenüe	Montparnasse – Bienvenüe	then on line 5
18 June 1949	Grenelle	Bir-Hakeim	
1970	Étoile	Charles de Gaulle – Étoile	

=== Themed or unique stations ===
Four stations on Line 6 have unique features or cultural theming:

- Étoile is the only terminus on the network with a single track and two docks, as well as the only one using the two sides of the doors : the port doors for alighting passengers, then the starboard ones for the passengers boarding in towards Nation. This is due to the original exploitation of the line, as an off-branch of line 1, back in 1900.
- Kléber is the only station on the network to have been built with four tracks and two docks from the get-go (back in 1900) without ever being a terminus. This is due to the aforementioned specific configuration of Étoile, which prevents the installation of a legitimate terminus there and makes Kléber the true western terminus of the line in regards to train regulation and driver switching. It is common to wait longer at this station when aboard a train heading towards Nation, and train switching there is not unheard of.
- Passy is the only station on the network that is both underground and overground.
- La Motte-Picquet – Grenelle contains several depictions of the coat of arms of the family of Toussaint-Guillaume Picquet de la Motte (Azure, three chrevrons or and three spearheads argent), who lends his name to the street over which the station lies. A fresco represents the historical wall that used to be situated along the rocade now supporting lines 2 and 6.
- Pasteur, once renovated similar to Mouton-Duvernet station on métro line 4, features displays about medicine installed during the centennial of the Métro. The panels describe the evolution of biology and medicine since the works of Louis Pasteur, their legal framework and application.
- Montparnasse-Bienvenüe, as its name implies, is host to an exposition about the founder of the Paris Métro, Fulgence Bienvenüe. Located essentially in the transfer corridors – especially around the long stretch of tunnel connecting lines 6 and 13 to 4 and 12 – , it features literary excerpts and a bust of the Breton civil engineer.
- Saint-Jacques is the only station of the whole network to not feature advertising panels. It is also the only station on which the outer gritstone walls are covered by glass panels the whole way through. Both are due to the high erodibility of the stone originally used for the station's walls, which makes them unable to support large panels regularly pasted over. The only panels on the stations feature network maps and information.
- Bel-Air is the only station purposedly built overground while both connecting tracks are underground. This is due to the fact that the Métro station was built on top of the former Bel-Air train station on the Vincennes line, itself close to the Bel-Air Ceinture station on the parisian Petite Ceinture. The subway station is the only surviving station of these three.

== Rolling stock ==
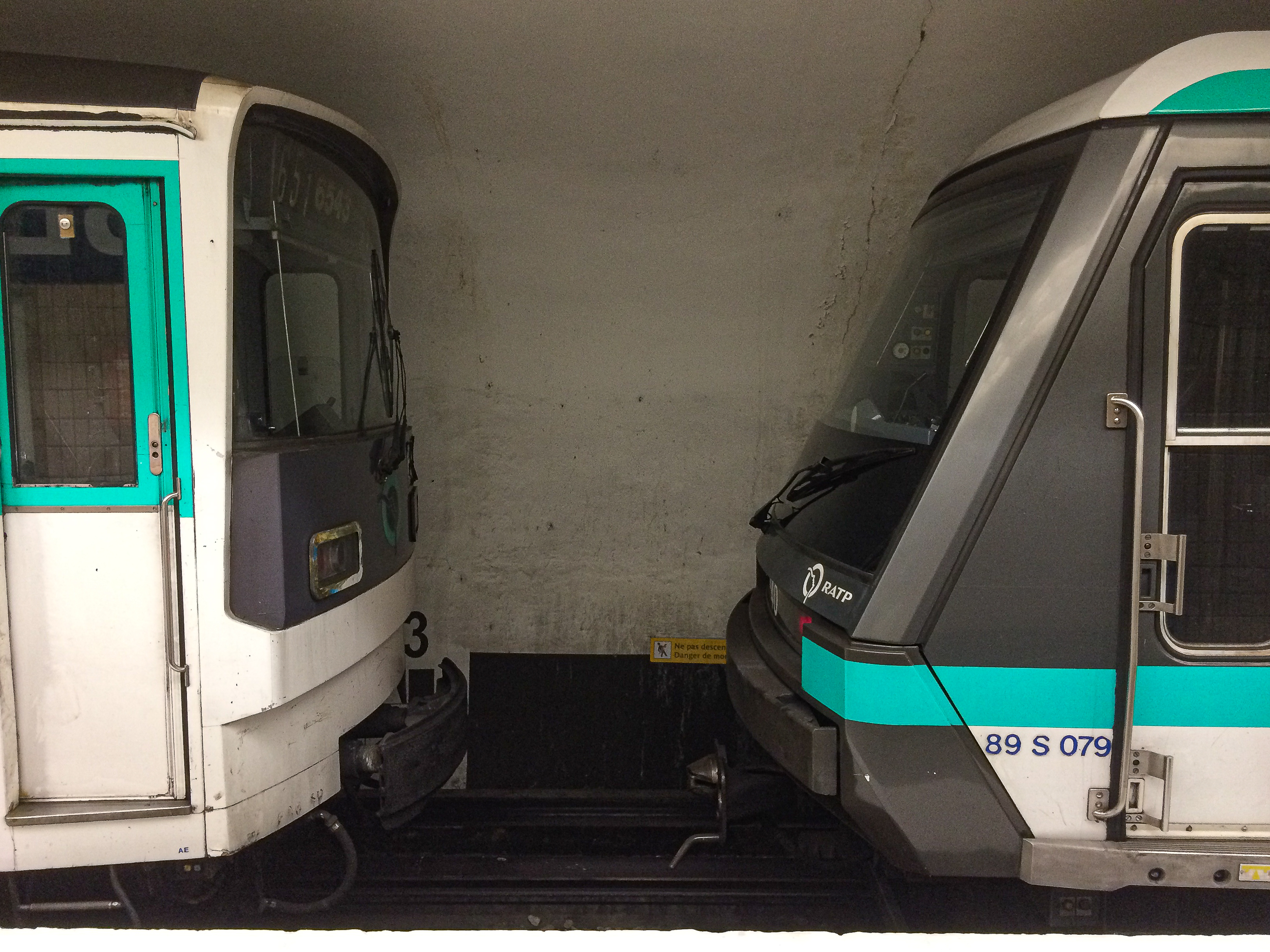
An MP73 (left) and an MP89 (right)

The Line 6 is composed of MP 89 CC trains, the latter transferred from Paris Métro Line 4 as a result of said line's automation. These trains have been refurbished with the Île-de-France Mobilités white and light blue livery and reduced to 5 cars.

The MP 89CC (# 48) was the first to enter revenue service on 12 January 2023, which replaces the MP 73 trains from 2023 to July 8, 2026, the last day of MP 73 service.

== Tourism ==
Some of the stations on line 6 are built on viaducts offering views of Paris, especially from the Bir-Hakeim bridge, which offers a panorama on the Eiffel Tower between Passy and Bir-Hakeim stations. Line 6 passes near several places of interest:

- The Place de l'Étoile and the Arc de Triomphe (Étoile).
- The place du Trocadéro (Trocadéro) and its sight on the Eiffel Tower from across the Seine.
- The Eiffel Tower and the Champ de Mars (Bir-Hakeim or La Motte-Picquet).
- Montparnasse, with its train station, famous cafés and the Montparnasse Tower (Montparnasse-Bienvenüe).
- The Denfert-Rochereau place, where the entrance to the parisian Catacombs is located (Denfert-Rochereau)
- Place d'Italie and the Butte aux Cailles district (Place d'Italie).
- The French Ministry of Finance, the Paris-Bercy train station, with the Paris-Bercy sports Arena and the Bercy gardens (Bercy).
- The Picpus cemetery, where Lafayette is buried among others (Picpus).
- Place de la Nation (Nation).

== Gallery ==
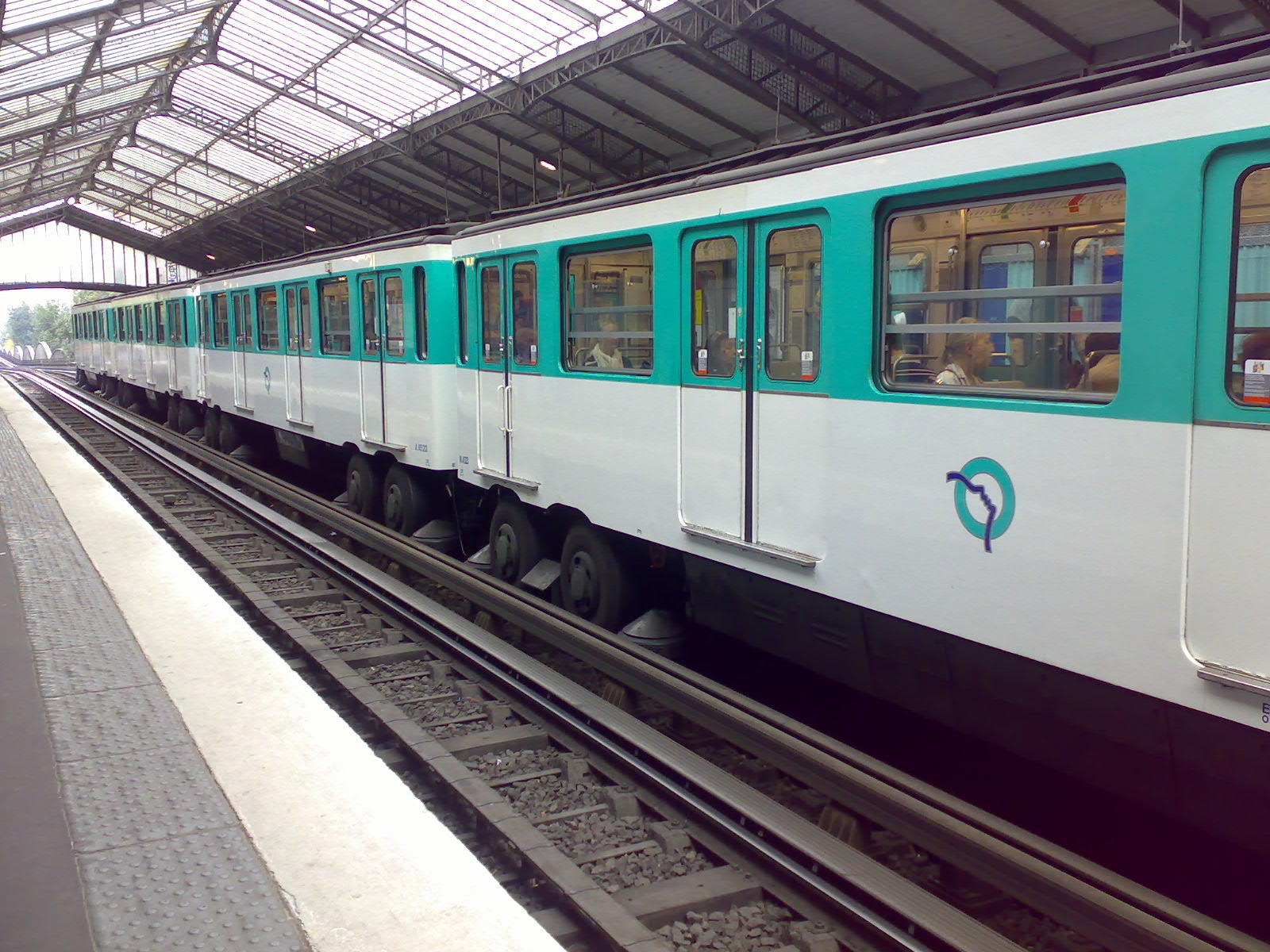
Bir-Hakeim

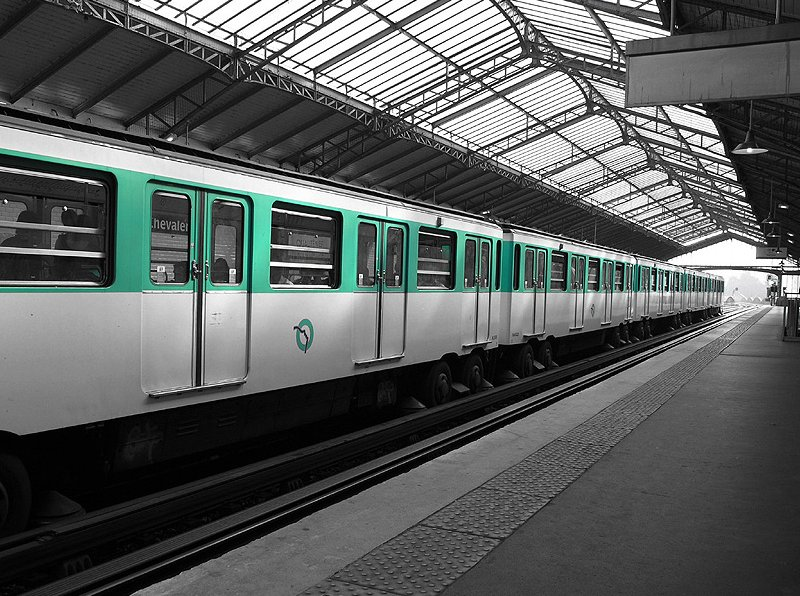
Chevaleret

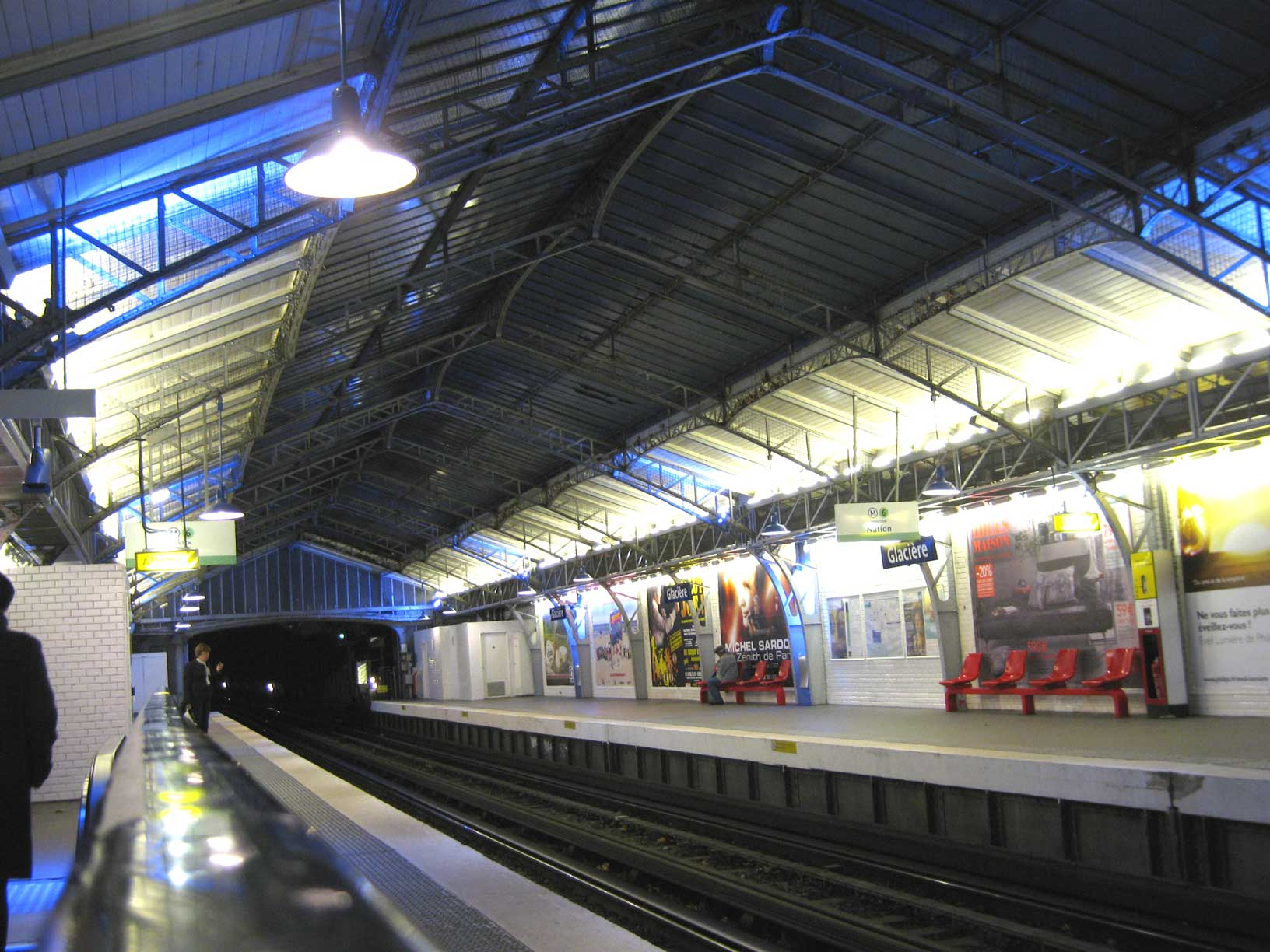
Glacière

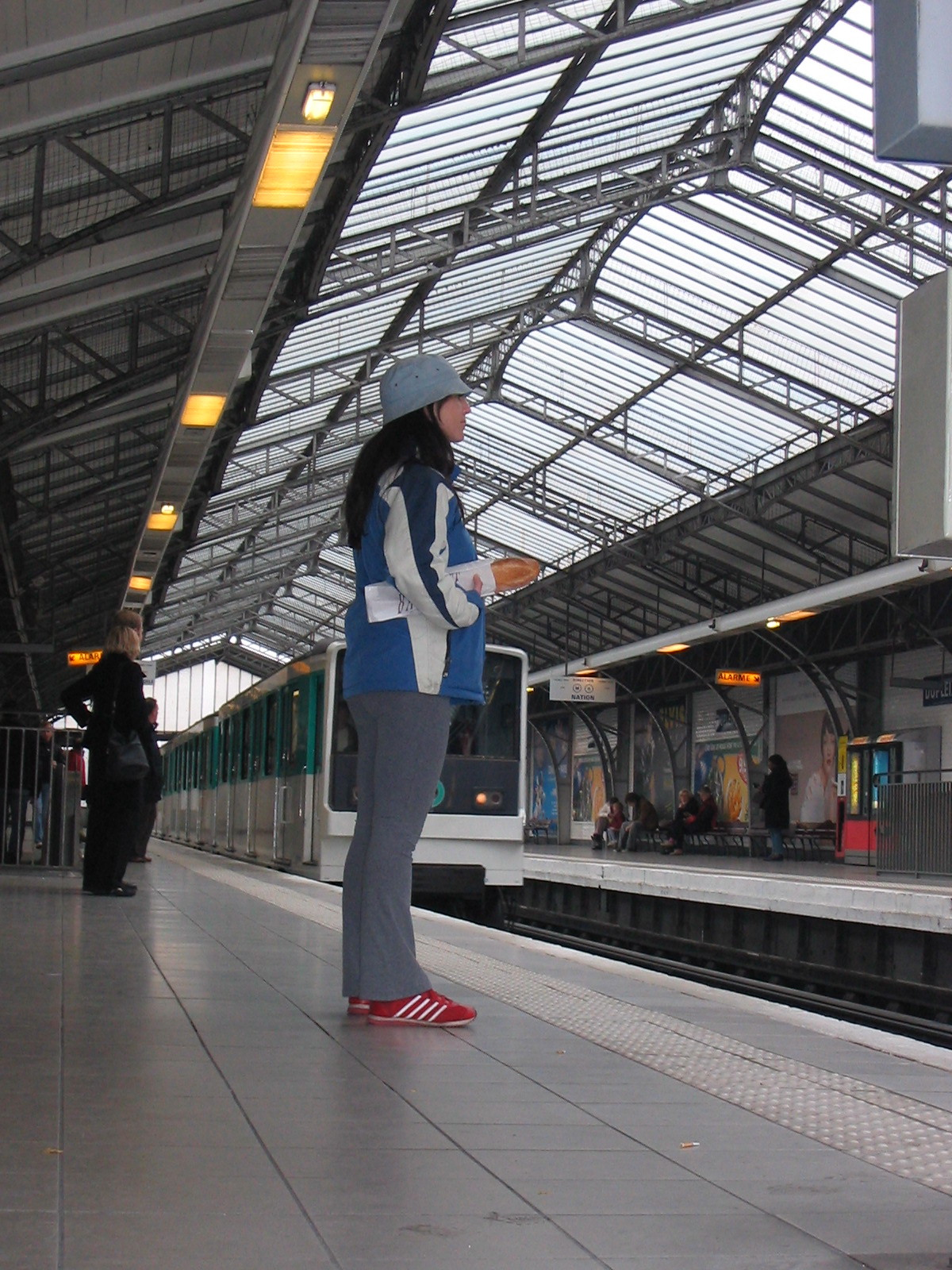
Dupleix

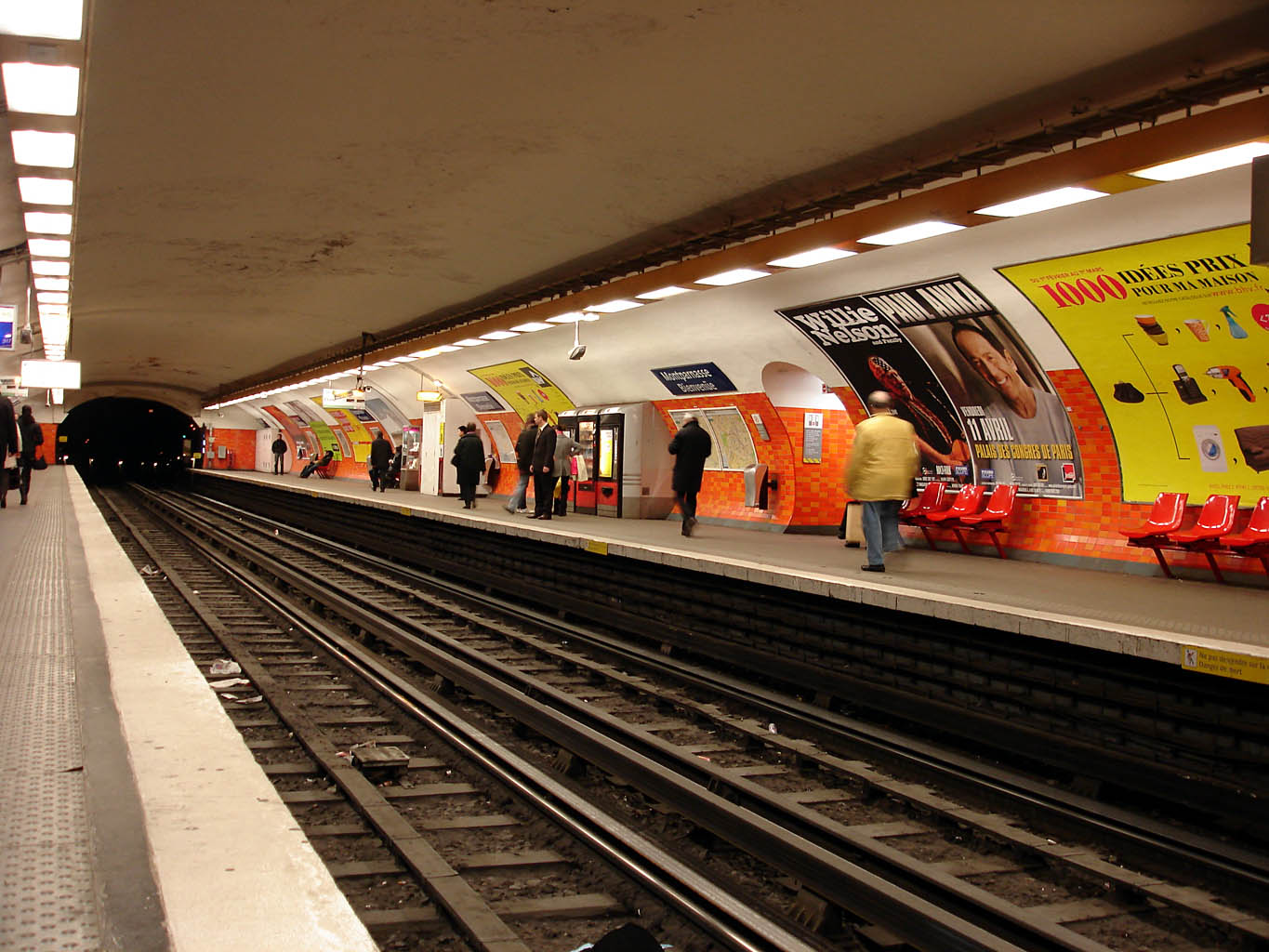
Montparnasse – Bienvenüe

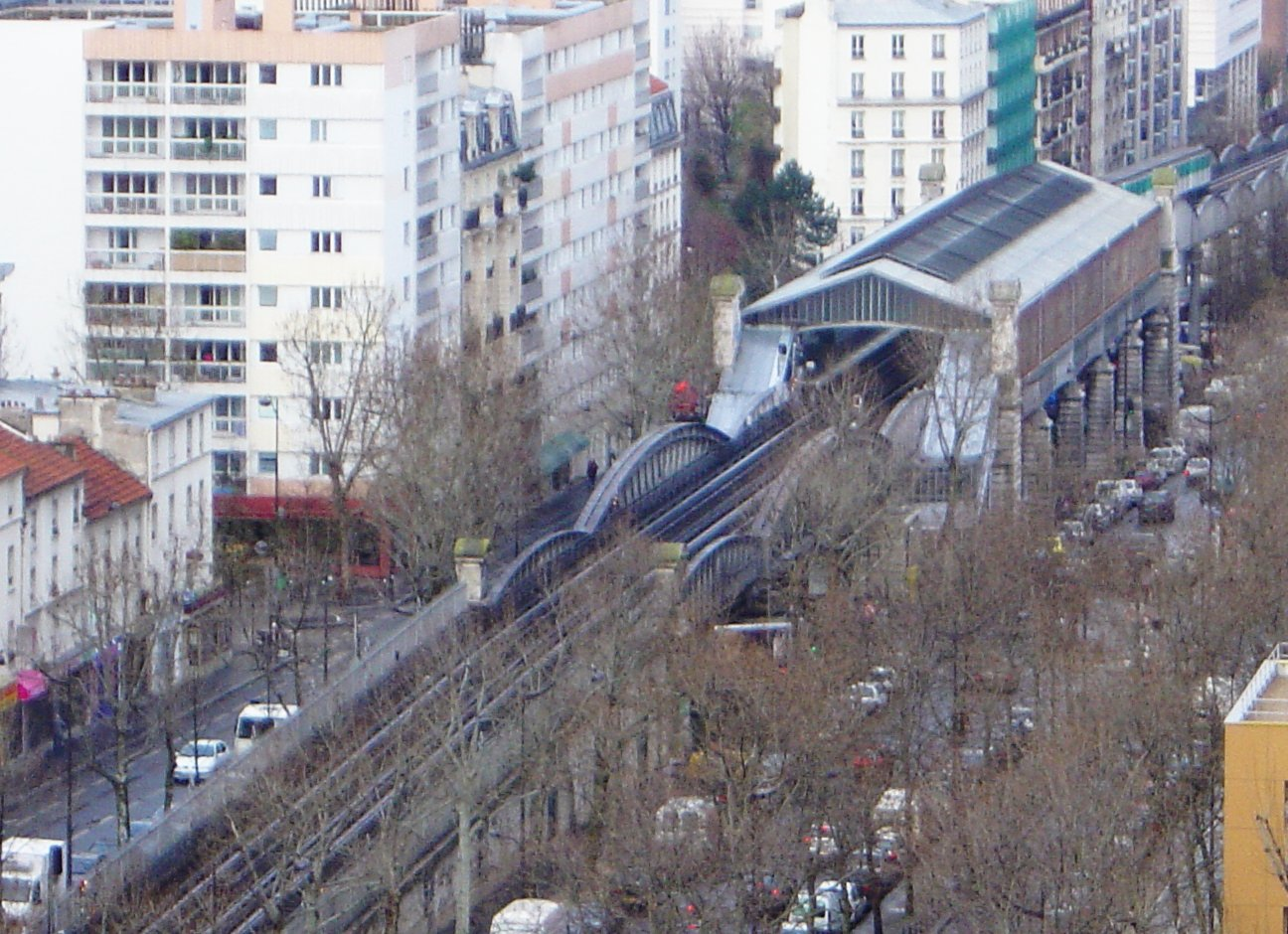
Nationale

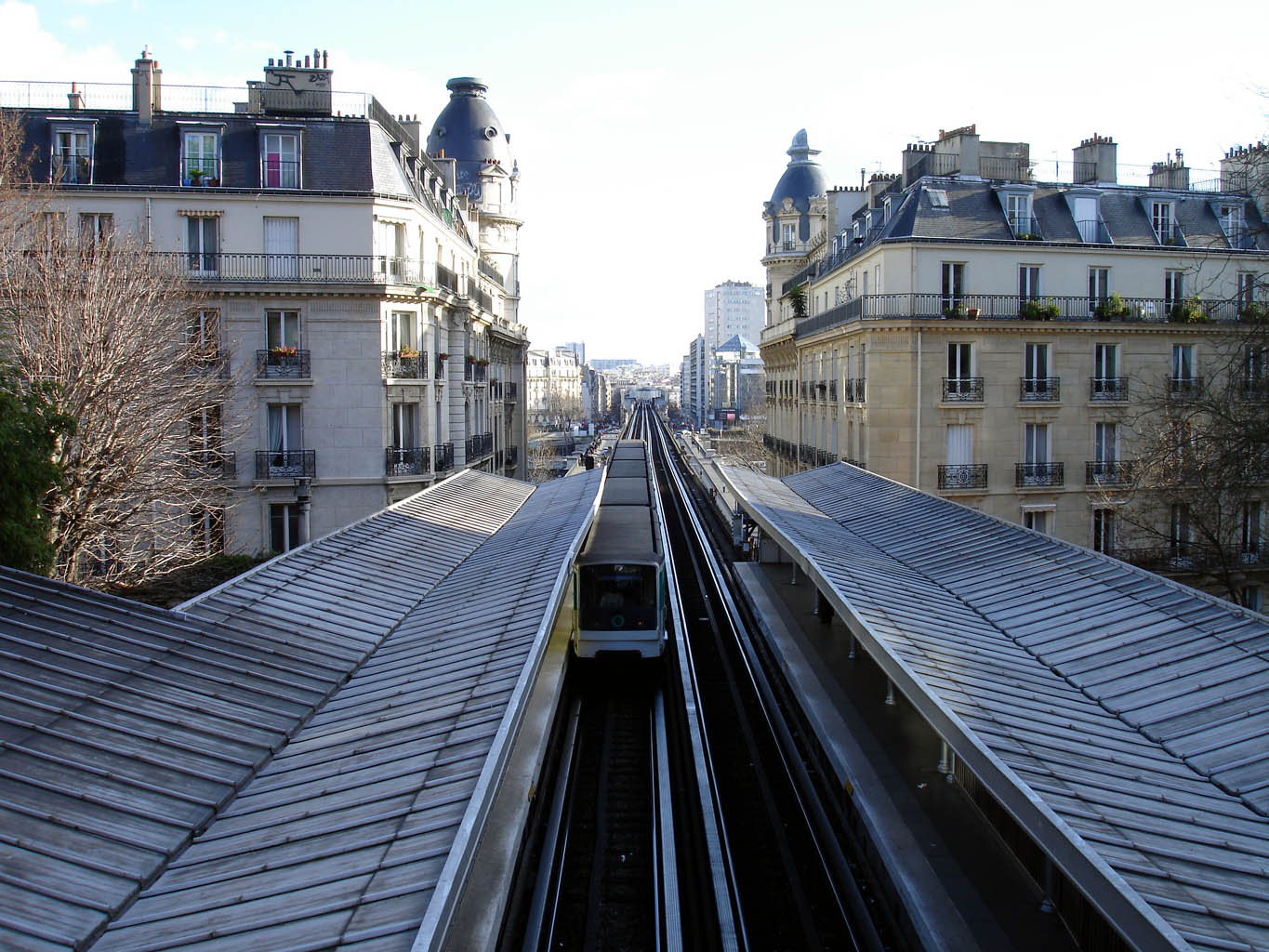
Passy

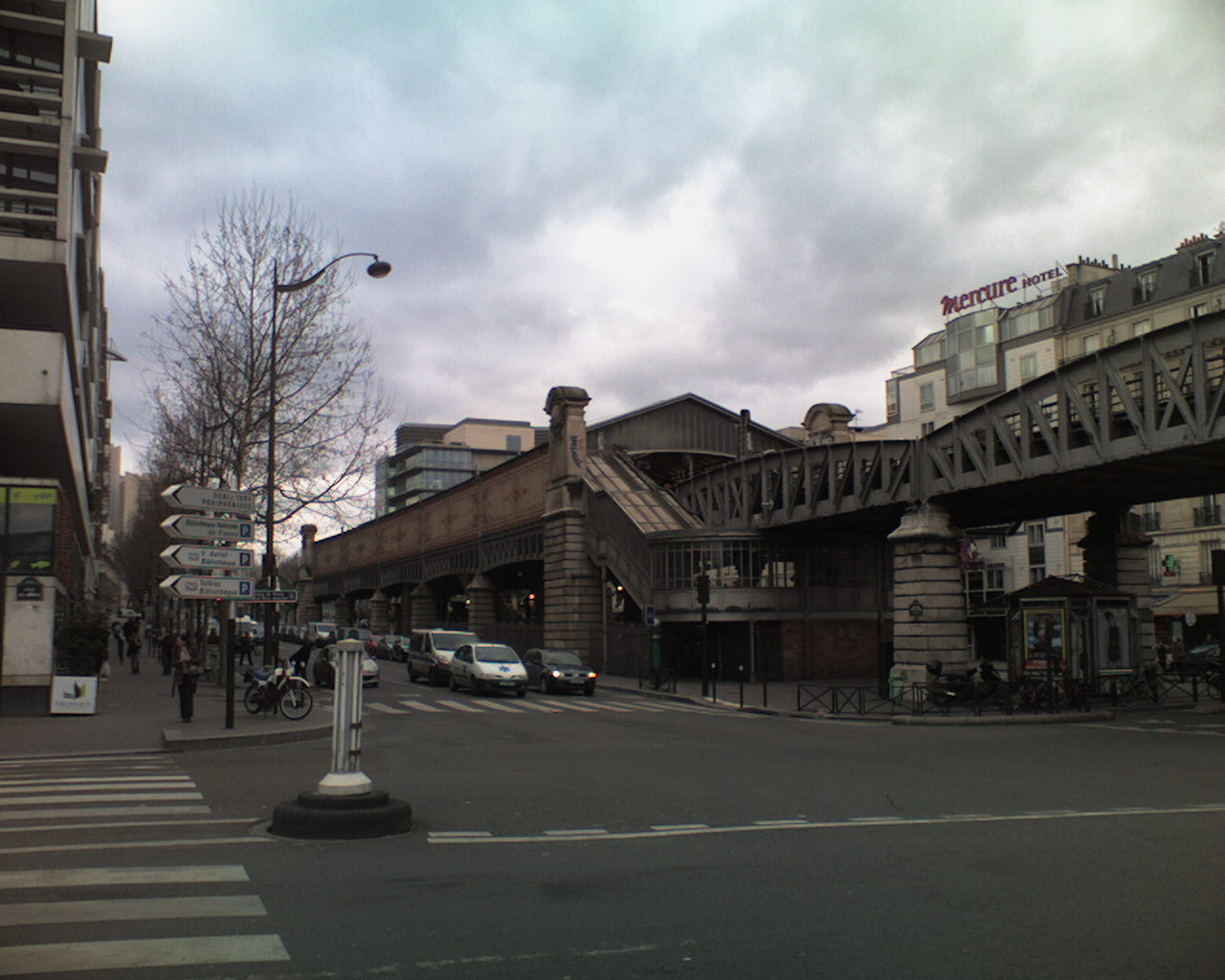
Quai de la Gare

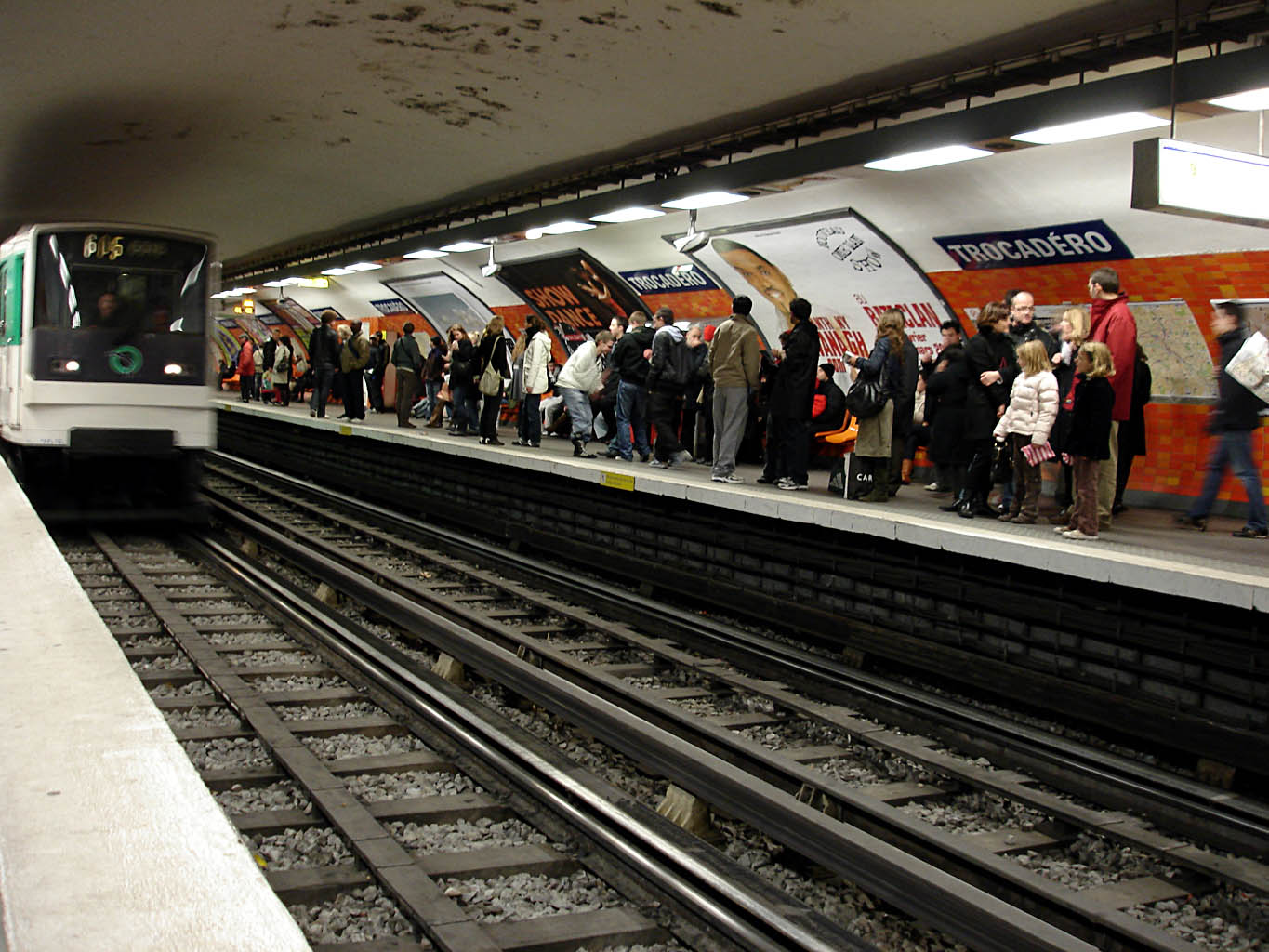
Trocadéro

Charles de Gaulle – Étoile

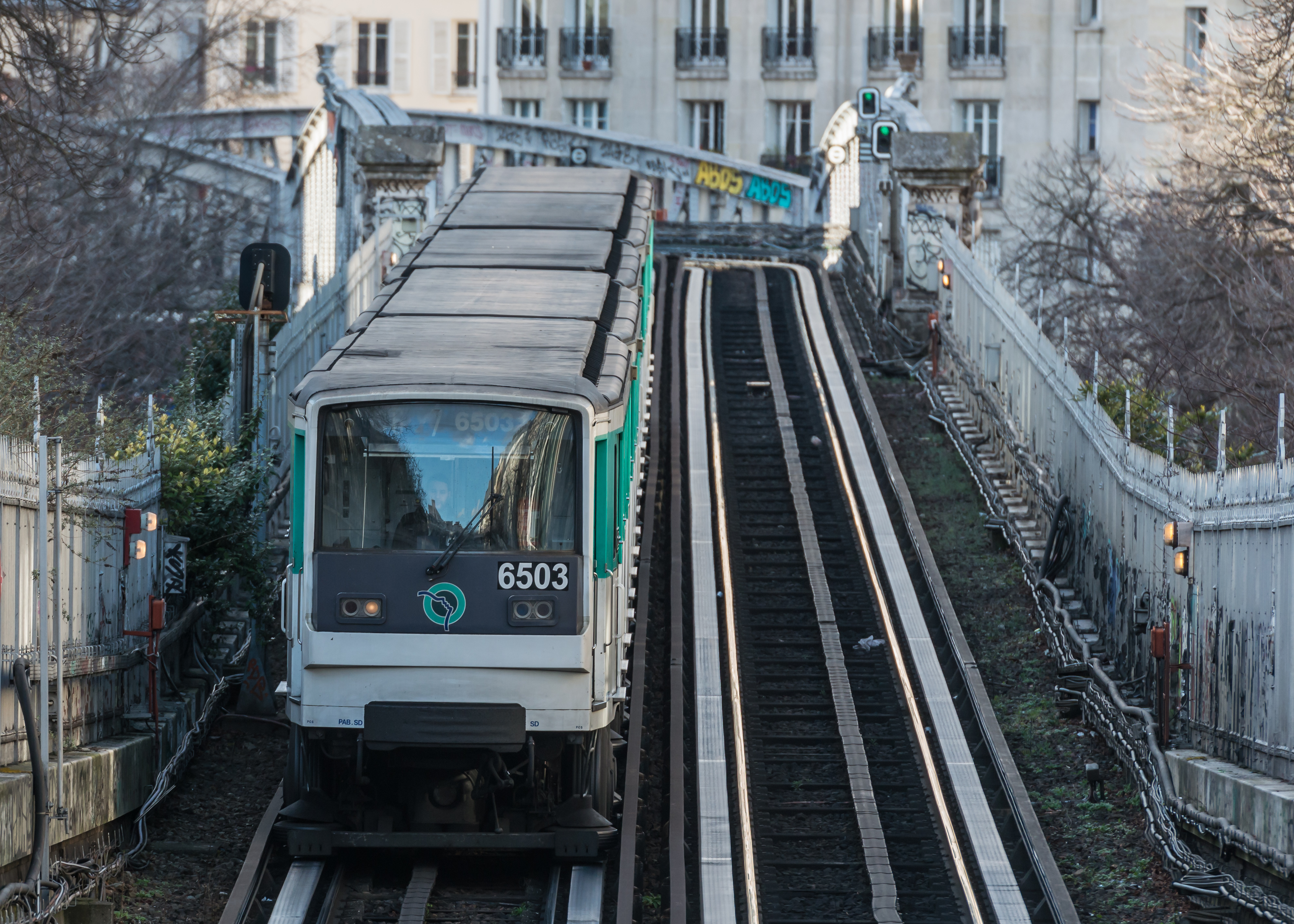
Viaduct ramp west of Pasteur station

New MP 89 rolling stock at Kléber

== See also ==
- Paris
- Transport in Paris
- List of stations of the Paris Métro
- List of stations of the Paris RER
- List of metro systems
- Rail transport in France
