= Place d'Italie station =

Metro station in Paris, France

Place d'Italie
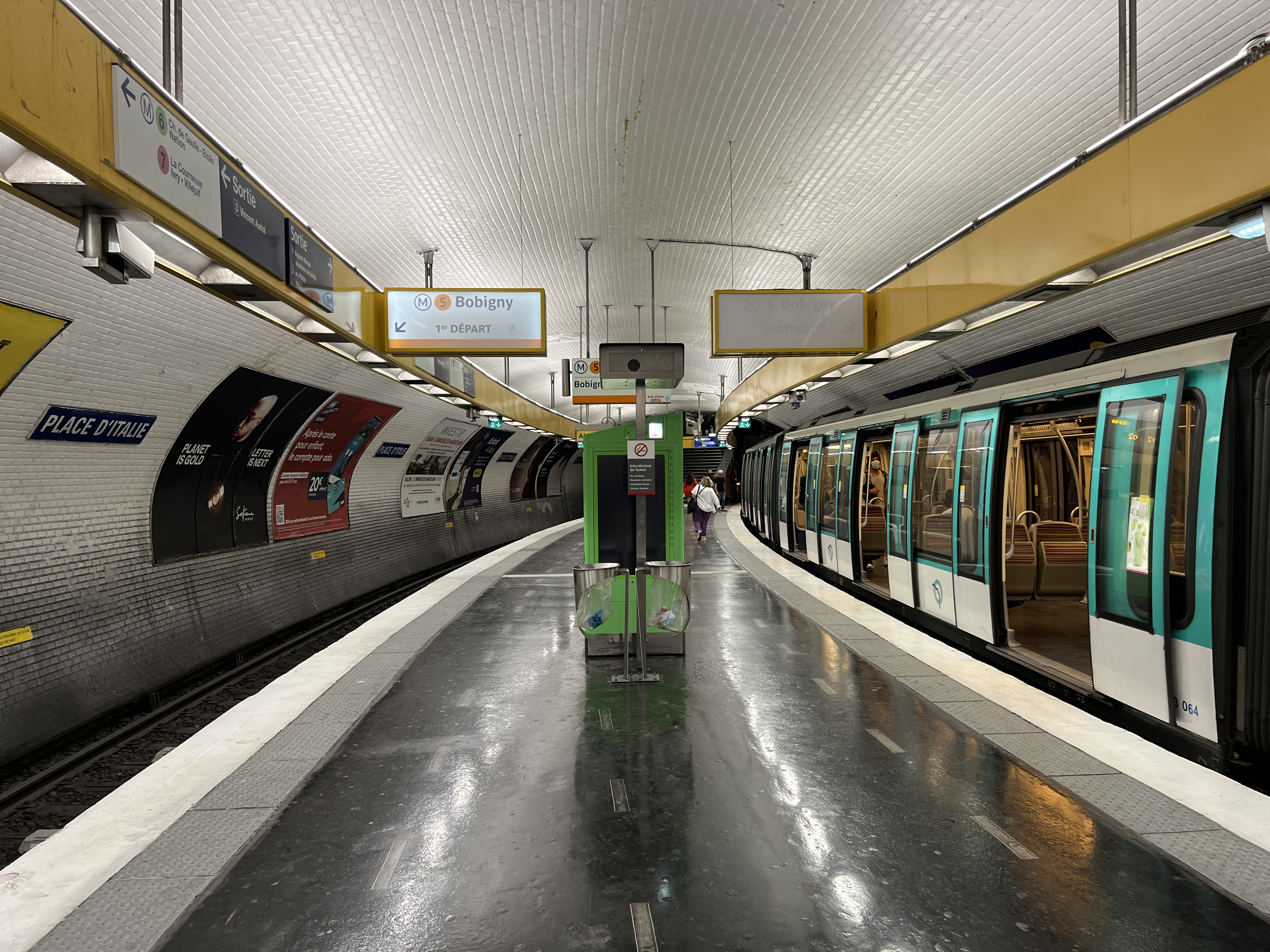
- Line 5 platforms at Place d'Italie

General information
- Location: 182, boul. Vincent Auriol; 2, rue Bobillot; Place d'Italie; 146, boul. de l'Hôpital; 13th arrondissement of Paris; Île-de-France; France
- Coordinates: 48°49′53″N 2°21′20″E
- Owner: RATP
- Operator: RATP

Other information
- Fare zone: 1

History
- Opened: 24 April 1906; 120 years ago (Line 6); 2 June 1906; 120 years ago (Line 5); 15 February 1930; 96 years ago (Line 7)

Services
| Preceding station | Paris Metro | Following station |
|---|---|---|
| Terminus | Line 5 | Campo Formio towards Bobigny–Pablo Picasso |
| Corvisart towards Charles de Gaulle–Étoile | Line 6 | Nationale towards Nation |
| Tolbiac towards Villejuif–Louis Aragon or Mairie d'Ivry | Line 7 | Les Gobelins towards La Courneuve–8 mai 1945 |
Location
- Location within Paris

Place d'Italie (French pronunciation: [plas ditali], literally "Italy Square") is a rapid transit station of the Paris Métro located in the heart of the 13th arrondissement of Paris, at the Place d'Italie. It is the southern terminus of Line 5 and is also served by Line 6 and Line 7.

== Location ==
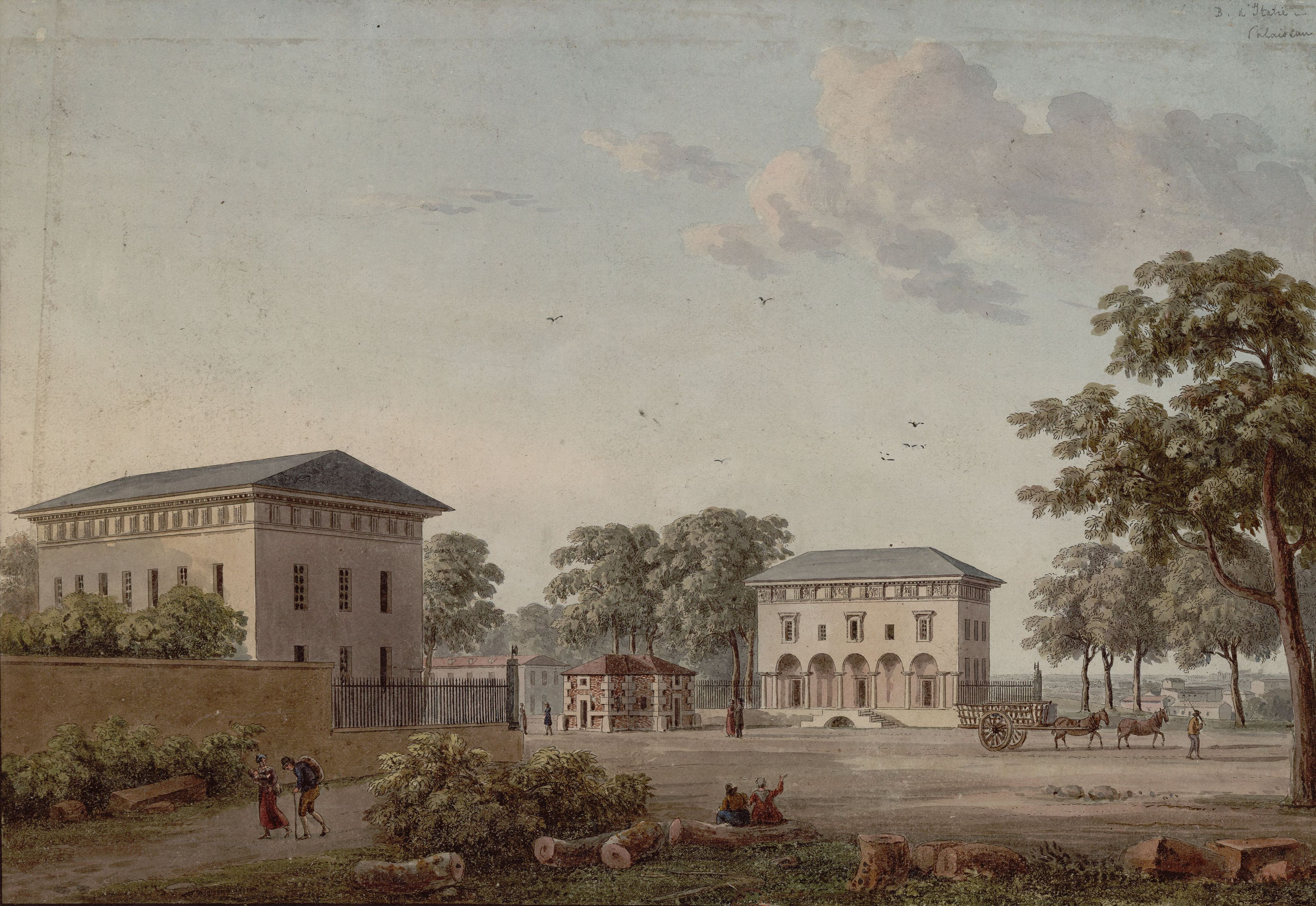
The old Barrière d'Italie in 1819

The Place d'Italie was the site of the Barrière d'Italie, a gate in the Wall of the Farmers-General, built to enforce tax collections on goods entering Paris between 1784 and 1791, where the old Roman road towards Lyon and Rome began. The station is situated at the crossing of five large Parisian streets: the Avenue d'Italie, the Boulevard Auguste Blanqui, the Avenue des Gobelins, the Boulevard de l'Hôpital, and the Boulevard Vincent Auriol. It was the starting point of the road connecting Paris to Italy, the current N7.

== History ==
The first platforms opened as part of the former Line 2 South on 24 April 1906, when it was extended from Passy. On 17 December 1906, Line 5 was extended to Lancry. On 14 October 1907 Line 2 South was incorporated into Line 5. On 1 March 1909, Line 6 was opened from Place d'Italie to Nation.

The Line 7 platforms opened on 15 February 1930 as part of a planned section of line Line 7, which was temporarily operated as part of Line 10 until the completion of the under-Seine crossing of line 7 from Pont de Sully to Place Monge. The station was integrated into line 7 on 26 April 1931. On 12 October 1942, the Place d'Italie Étoile section was transferred from line 5 to line 6 in order to separate the underground and elevated sections of the metro (because the latter were more vulnerable to air attack). As a result, Line 5, rather than Line 6, terminated at Place d'Italie.

Like one-third of the stations in the network between 1974 and 1984, the three stopping points were modernized by adopting the decorative style "Andreu-Motte", in yellow for line 5, blue for line 6 and green for line 7. However, the wharf of line 5 will be later removed its yellow tiled bench seat, which was surmounted by seats "Motte" features resembling its hue.

From 25 June to 2 September 2007, the platforms of Line 5 were closed to allow a modification of the track plan with the aim of reusing the loop of Italy, to increase the frequency of the line. the terminus was then temporarily shifted to the neighboring Campo-Formio metro station.

As part of the RATP's Renouveau du métro program, the corridors of the station were renovated from 31 March 2008. In the mid-2010s, the Line 7 station, in turn, underwent a minor modernization with green tiled benches replaced with contemporary seats of the same color.

From 25 November to 11 December 2015, the platforms for Line 6 (as well as the exterior of an MP 73 train) were decorated in a Star Wars theme to promote the theatrical release of Star Wars Episode VII: The Force Awakens. At the end of 2016, its blue checked banquettes were replaced by contemporary seats of the same color.

In 2018, 11,508,361 travelers entered this station which places it at the 13th position of the metro stations for its attendance.

== Passenger services ==
=== Access ===
There are four access points to Place d'Italie station:

1. Auguste Blanqui: one stairway at 2 Rue Bobillot, decorated with an Guimard edicule, inscribed as a historic monument on 12 February 2016;
2. Grand Écran: one stairway at Place d'Italie consisting of a fixed staircase also embellished with an entrance designed by Hector Guimard and classified as a historical monument;
3. Vincent Auriol: one stairway and one escalator 182 Boulevard Vincent-Auriol with Dervaux candelabra;
4. Mairie du XIIIème: one stairway at 146 Boulevard de l'Hôpital.

=== Station layout ===
Street Level

| B1 | Connecting level |

Lines 5/6 platforms
| Lines 5/6 platforms | Northbound Line 5 | toward Bobigny – Pablo Picasso (Campo Formio) → |
| Lines 5/6 platforms | Island platform, doors will open on the left, right |
| Lines 5/6 platforms | Northbound Line 5 | toward Bobigny – Pablo Picasso (Campo Formio) → |
| Lines 5/6 platforms | Side platform, doors will open on the right for line 6 only |
| Lines 5/6 platforms | Westbound Line 6 | ← toward Charles de Gaulle – Étoile (Corvisart) |
| Lines 5/6 platforms | Eastbound Line 6 | toward Nation (Nationale) → |
| Lines 5/6 platforms | Side platform, doors will open on the right |

| Line 7 platforms | Side platform, doors will open on the right |
| Line 7 platforms | Southbound | ← toward Villejuif – Louis Aragon or Mairie d'Ivry (Tolbiac) |
| Line 7 platforms | Northbound | toward La Courneuve–8 mai 1945 (Les Gobelins) → |
| Line 7 platforms | Side platform, doors will open on the right |

=== Platforms ===
Each stopping point has an elliptical vault and an Andreu-Motte style decoration, but the characteristic benches and seats have been gradually removed over the years.

The terminus of Line 5 is in the form of a curved station with two lanes framing a central platform. The Motte style is only represented by two yellow luminous strips, while the platform has a few white sit-stand bars. Bevelled white ceramic tiles cover the walls, vault, and tunnel exits. The advertising frames are metallic, and the name of the station is written in capital letters on enamelled plates.

The platforms of Line 6 are of standard configuration. Two in number, they are separated by the metro tracks in the centre. The decoration is materialized by two blue luminous strips and tunnel exits treated in blue flat tiling, except to the right of the access outlets. The latter are covered with white bevelled tiles, as are the walls and the vault. The advertising frames are metallic, and the name of the station is written on enamelled plates, with an unusual font for the Paris metro. The seats are Akiko style blue.

The Line 7 station is also available. It has two green light luminous and Akiko seats of the same colour. Bevelled white ceramic tiles cover the piers, the vault, the tunnel exits and the outlets of the corridors. The advertising frames are a faience honey colour and the name of the station is also faience in the style of the original CMP.

=== Bus connections ===
The station is served by Lines 27, 47, 57, 59, 61, 64, 67 and 83 of the RATP Bus Network. At night, it is served by lines N15, N22, N31 and N144 of the Noctilien network.

== Nearby attractions ==
- The mayor's office of the 13th arrondissement.
- The "Big Screen Building," a work of the Japanese architect Kenzo Tange, which includes offices, movie theaters, and shops.
- Centre commercial Italie
- Quartier de la Butte-aux-Cailles

== Gallery ==
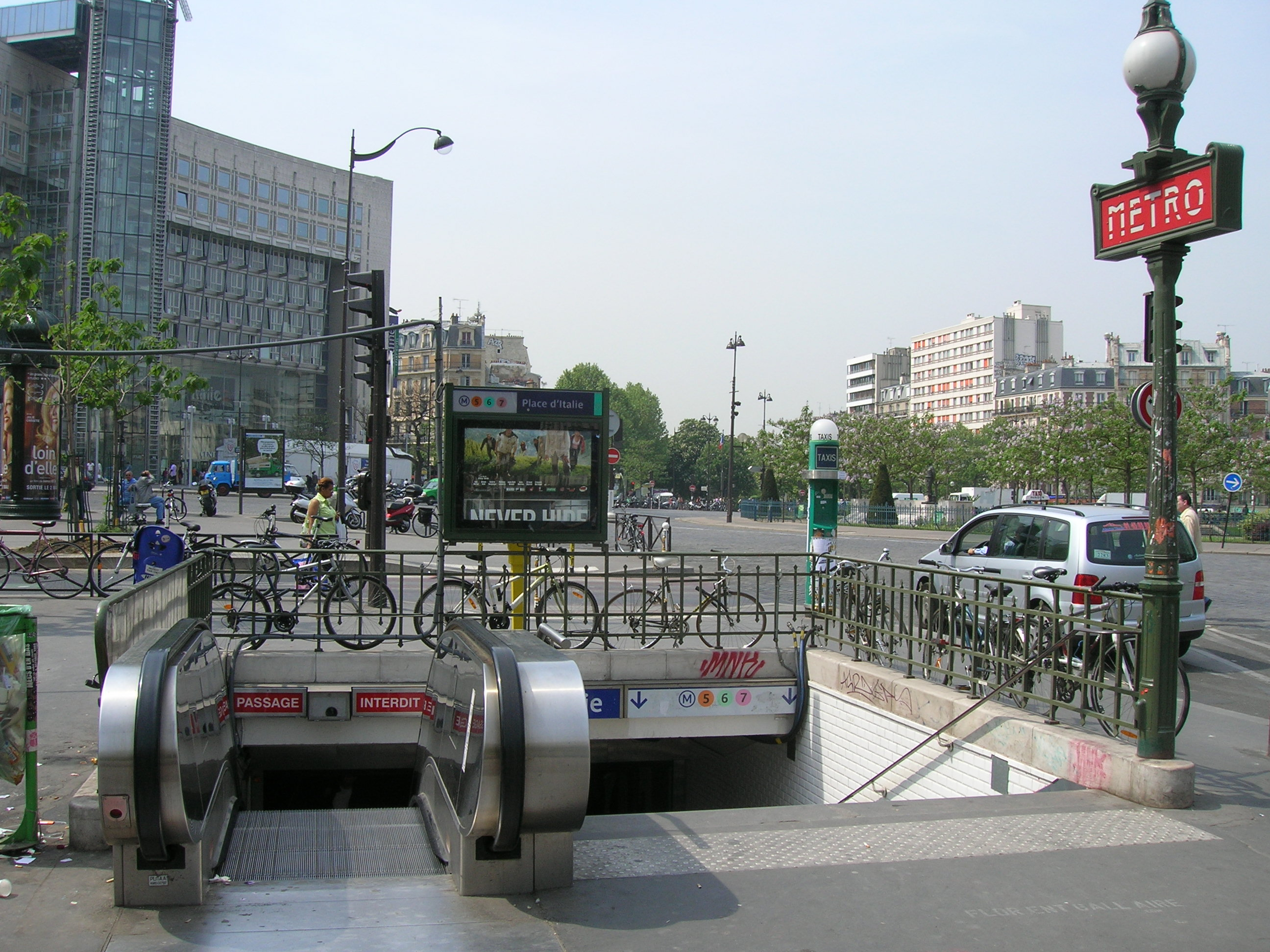
Street-level entrance at Place d'Italie

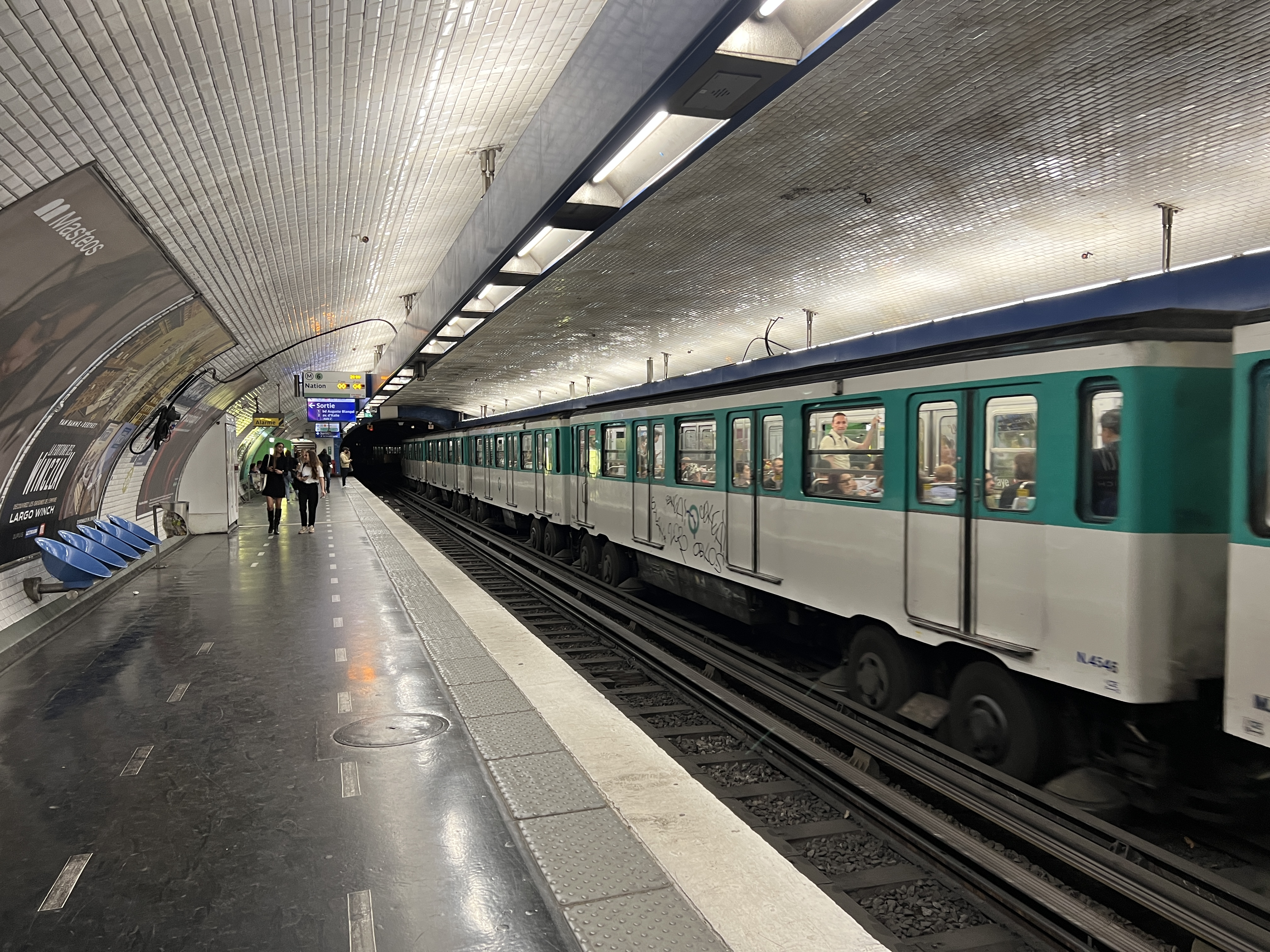
Line 6 platforms at Place d'Italie

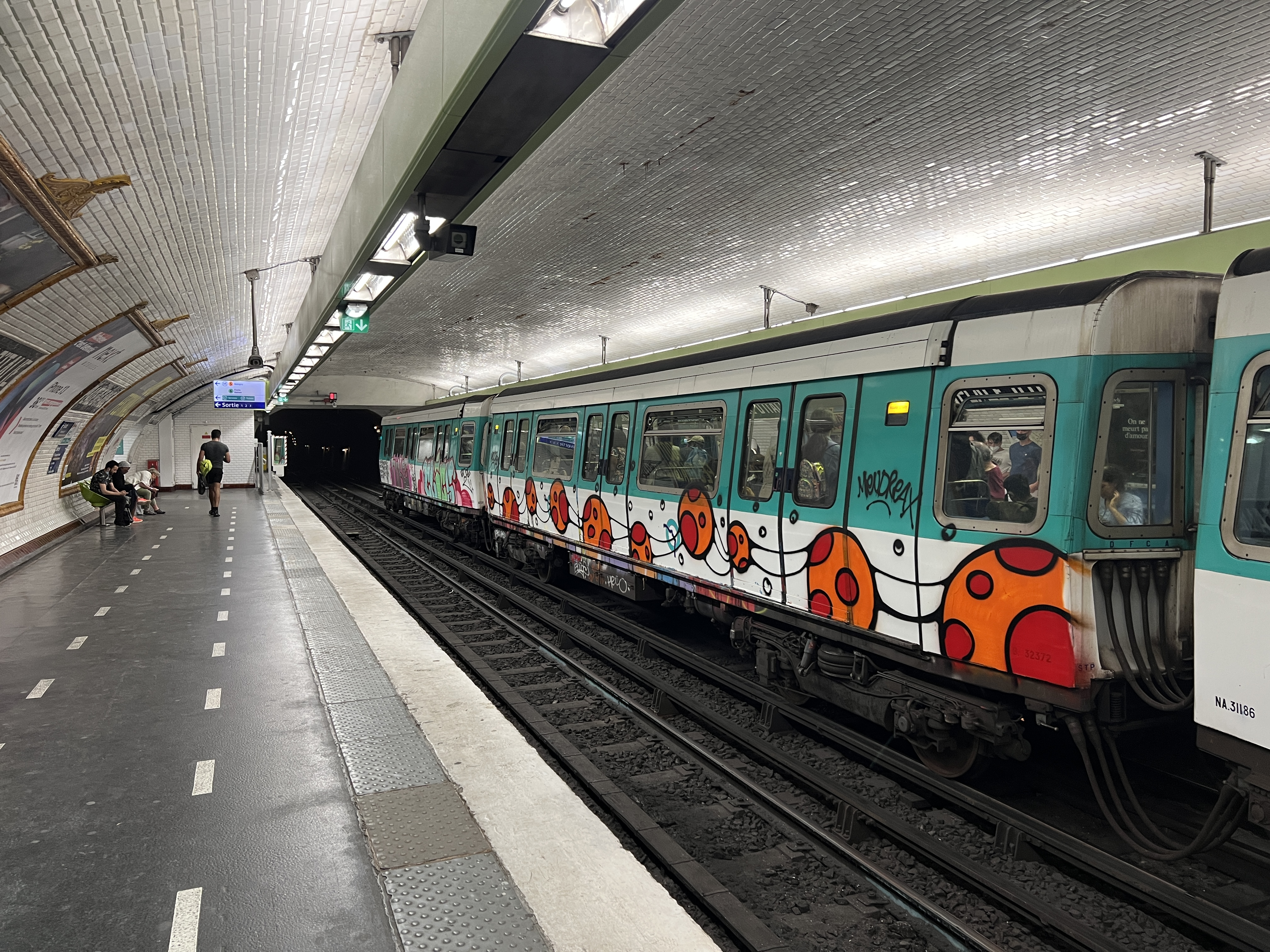
Line 7 platforms at Place d'Italie

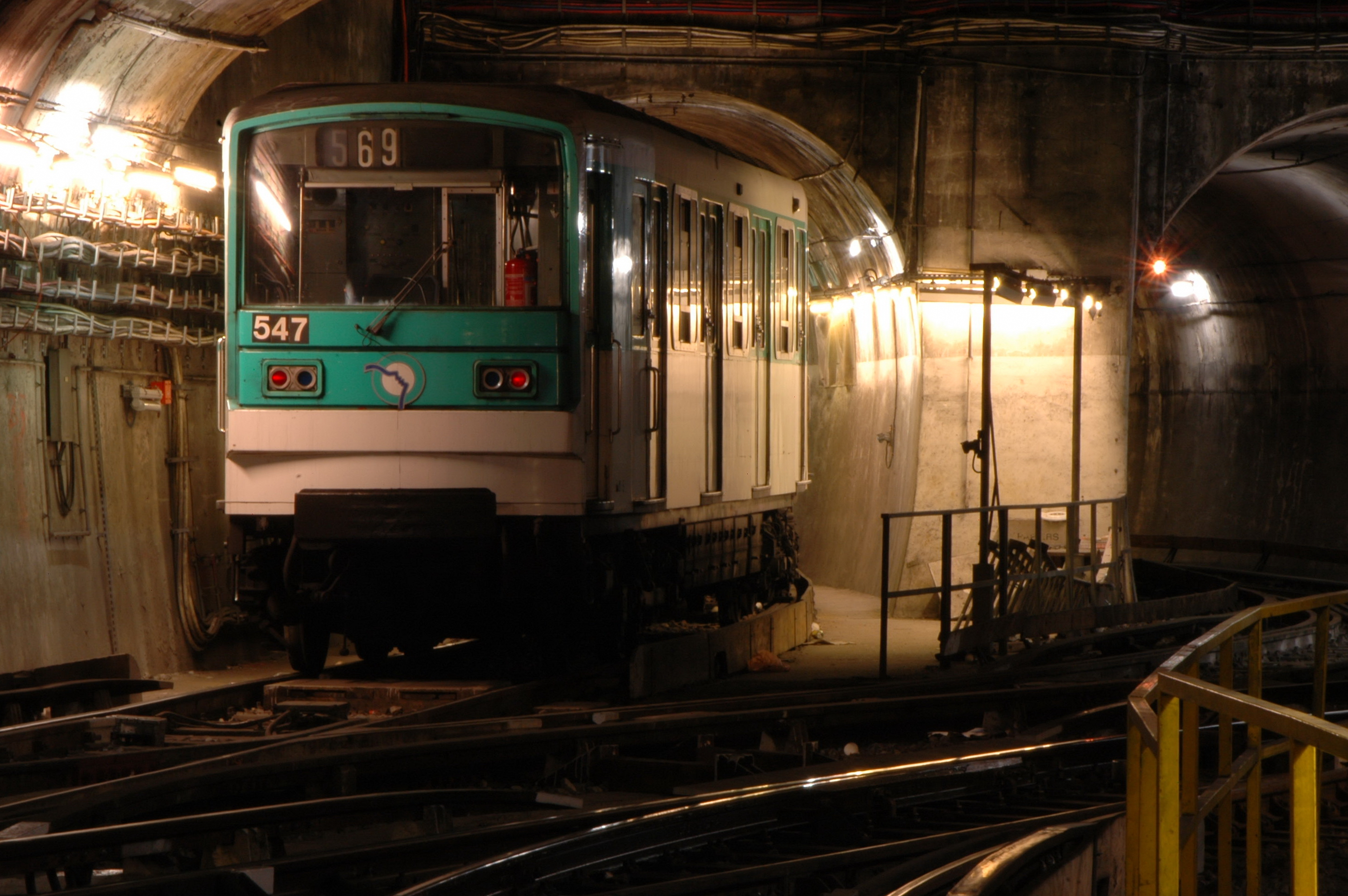
MF 67 rolling stock on Line 5 near Place d'Italie
