= Eiffel =

Eiffel usually is a reference to Gustave Eiffel (1832–1923), engineer and designer of the Eiffel Tower and the Statue of Liberty, and may refer to:

== Places ==
- Eiffel Tower, in Paris, France, designed by Gustave Eiffel
  - Champ de Mars – Tour Eiffel station, Metro station serving the Eiffel Tower
- Eiffel Bridge, Ungheni, Moldova, designed by Gustave Eiffel
- Eiffel Bridge, Láchar, Spain, built by the studio of Gustave Eiffel
- Eiffel Building, São Paulo, Brazil; a mixed use building
- Eiffel Peak, a summit in Alberta, Canada

== Education ==
- Eiffel School of Management (est. 2007), Creteil, France
- Gustave Eiffel French School of Budapest, Hungary
- Gustave Eiffel University (est. 2020), Champs-sur-Marne, Marne la Vallée, France
- Lycée Gustave Eiffel (disambiguation)

== Music ==
- Eiffel 65, an Italian electronic music group, originally called Eiffel
- Eiffel (band), a French rock group
- 5 Eiffel (EP), a 1982 record by Kim Larsen
- "Alec Eiffel", a song by the alternative rock band Pixies

== Other uses ==
- Eiffel (company), successor of Gustave Eiffel's engineering company
- Eiffel (film), a 2021 French film
- Eiffel I'm in Love, a 2003 Indonesian teen romantic comedy film directed by Nasri Cheppy. The film stars Samuel Rizal and Shandy Aulia as the main characters
- Eiffel (programming language), developed by Bertrand Meyer
  - EiffelStudio, a development environment for the programming language
  - Visual Eiffel
- Eiffel Forum License, a free software license

== People with the surname ==
- Erika Eiffel, American woman who "married" the Eiffel Tower

== See also ==
- Eiffel Tower (disambiguation)
- Eiffel Bridge (disambiguation)
- Tour Eiffel (disambiguation)
- Gustave Eiffel (disambiguation)
- Eifel, a mountain region in Germany, Belgium and Luxembourg
- Jean Effel (1908–1982), French painter, caricaturist, illustrator and journalist
