= List of faculties of law in France =

This is a list of faculties of law in France by region.

== Auvergne-Rhône-Alpes ==
- University Savoie Mont Blanc, Faculty of Law, Jacob-Bellecombette
- University of Clermont Auvergne, Legal Science and Politics, Clermont-Ferrand
- Pierre Mendès-France University, Grenoble, U.F.R., Faculty of Law
- Jean Moulin University Lyon 3, Faculty of Law, Lyon
- Université Catholique de Lyon - Faculté de Droit
- University Lumière Lyon, Faculty of Juridical Sciences, University Campus of Bron-Parilly
- Jean Monnet University, St-Etienne, Faculty of Law and Economics and Management

== Bourgogne-Franche-Comté ==
- University of Franche-Comté (Besançon), Faculty of Law and Economics and Political Science
- University of Dijon, Faculty of Law and Political Science

== Brittany ==
- University of Rennes I, Faculty of Law and Political Sciences
- Faculty of Law and Economic Sciences, University of Western Brittany, Brest
- Université de Bretagne-Sud - Droit, Économie et Gestion, Lorient

== Centre-Val de Loire ==
- University of Orléans, Faculty of Law and Economic Sciences
- University of Tours, Faculty of Law, Economy, Management, and Commerce

== Grand Est ==
- Paul Verlaine University - Metz U.E.R., Juridical, Economic, and Social Sciences, Metz
- Université de Haute-Alsace - Faculté des Sciences Économiques, Sociales et Juridiques, Mulhouse
- University of Nancy, U.E.R. Faculty of Law and Economic Sciences
- University of Reims Champagne-Ardenne, U.E.R. Faculty of Law and Sciences, Reims
- University of Strasbourg, Faculty of Management, Law, and Political Sciences

== Guadeloupe ==
- Université des Antilles et de la Guyane - Faculty of Law and Economics, Pointe-à-Pitre

== Hauts-de-France ==
- Université Lille 2 Droit et Santé, Lille
- University of Picardie, U.E.R. of Law and Political and Social Sciences, Amiens
- Université du Littoral Côte d'Opale - Droit, Dunkerque
- Université Catholique de Lille - Faculté Libre de Droit
- Université de Valenciennes et Hainaut-Cambrésis - Faculté de Droit, d'Economie et de Gestion, Valenciennes

== Île-de-France ==
- Paris 1 Panthéon-Sorbonne University, Paris
- Paris-Panthéon-Assas University, Paris
- Paris Cité University - Faculté de Droit, Malakoff
- Paris 8 University - Département de Droit, Saint-Denis
- Paris Dauphine University - Faculté de Droit, Paris
- Paris Nanterre University, U.E.R. of Juridical, Administrative, and Political Sciences
- Paris-Saclay University, Faculty of Law and Economic Sciences (Sceaux and Orsay)
- University of Évry Val d'Essonne - Sciences Économiques et Juridiques, Évry, Essonne
- University of Versailles Saint-Quentin-en-Yvelines - Faculté de Droit et de Science Politique, Guyancourt
- Paris-East Créteil University, Faculty of Law and Economic Sciences, Créteil
- Sorbonne Paris North University, Law and Political Sciences, Villetaneuse
- CY Cergy Paris University, Department of Law, Cergy

== Martinique ==
- Université des Antilles et de la Guyane - Faculty of Law and Economics, Schœlcher

== Normandy ==
- Faculty of Law and Political Science, University of Caen, Caen
- University of Le Havre, Faculty of International Affairs, Law department
- University of Rouen, Faculty of Law and Economic Sciences

== Nouvelle-Aquitaine ==
- Faculty of Law and Political Sciences, Montesquieu University, Bordeaux
- Université de la Rochelle - Faculté de Droit, Science Politique et de Gestion, La Rochelle
- University of Limoges, Faculty of Law and Economic Sciences
- University of Pau and the Adour region, UFR of Law, Economy, and Management (name written at the entrance : Faculty of Law and Economic Sciences), Pau, Pyrénées-Atlantiques
- University of Poitiers, UFR Law and Social Sciences

== Occitanie ==
- University of Montpellier, Faculty of Law and Economic Sciences
- Department of Law and Economics, University of Perpignan Via Domitia, Perpignan
- Toulouse school of law

== Pays de la Loire ==
- Faculty of Law and Economic Sciences, University of Angers, Angers
- Institut catholique d'études supérieures - Faculté de Droit, La Roche sur Yon
- Faculty of Law and Economic Sciences, University of Maine, Le Mans
- University of Nantes, UFR Law and Political Sciences, Chemin de la Censive du Tertre

== Provence-Alpes-Côte d'Azur ==
- Faculty of Law and Political Science, Aix-Marseille University (Aix-en-Provence, Marseille and Arles)
- Department of Legal Sciences and Economic Policy, University of Avignon and Vaucluse, Avignon
- Faculty of Law, University of the South, Toulon
- University of Nice, UFR Juridical, Political, Economic, and Management Sciences
- Université Pascal Paoli - Droit, Sciences Sociales, Economiques et de Gestion, Corsica

== Réunion ==
- Université de la Réunion - Faculté de Droit et d'Economie, Saint-Denis Messag

UFR = Education and Research Unit (unité de formation et de recherche) U.E.R. = Teaching and Research Unit (Unité d'enseignement et de recherche)
