= Gustave Eiffel (disambiguation) =

Gustave Eiffel (1832–1923) was a French engineer and designer of the Eiffel Tower of Paris.

Gustave Eiffel may also refer to:

- Gustave Eiffel French School of Budapest, Hungary
- Gustave Eiffel University, Champs-sur-Marne, Marne la Vallée, France
- IAE Gustave Eiffel School of Management (est. 2007), Creteil, France
- Lycée Gustave Eiffel (disambiguation), several schools

== See also ==
- Eiffel (disambiguation)
- Gustav (disambiguation)
