= Eiffel Bridge =

Eiffel Bridge can refer to:

- Eiffel Bridge, Láchar, a bridge in Spain
- Eiffel Bridge, Ungheni, a railway bridge in Ungheni, Moldova
- Eiffel Bridge, Tsagveri, a railway bridge in Tsagveri, Georgia
- Tour Eiffel Bridge (Eiffel Tower Bridge; Eiffel Bridge), Gatineau, Quebec, Canada
- Ponte Eiffel (Portuguese: Eiffel Bridge), Viana do Castelo, Portugal
- Maria Pia Bridge, a bridge in Porto, Portugal; designed by Gustave Eiffel
- Garabit viaduct, a rail bridge in Southern France; constructed by Gustave Eiffel

== See also ==
- Eiffel (disambiguation)
