= Dupleix station =

Metro station in Paris, France

Dupleix
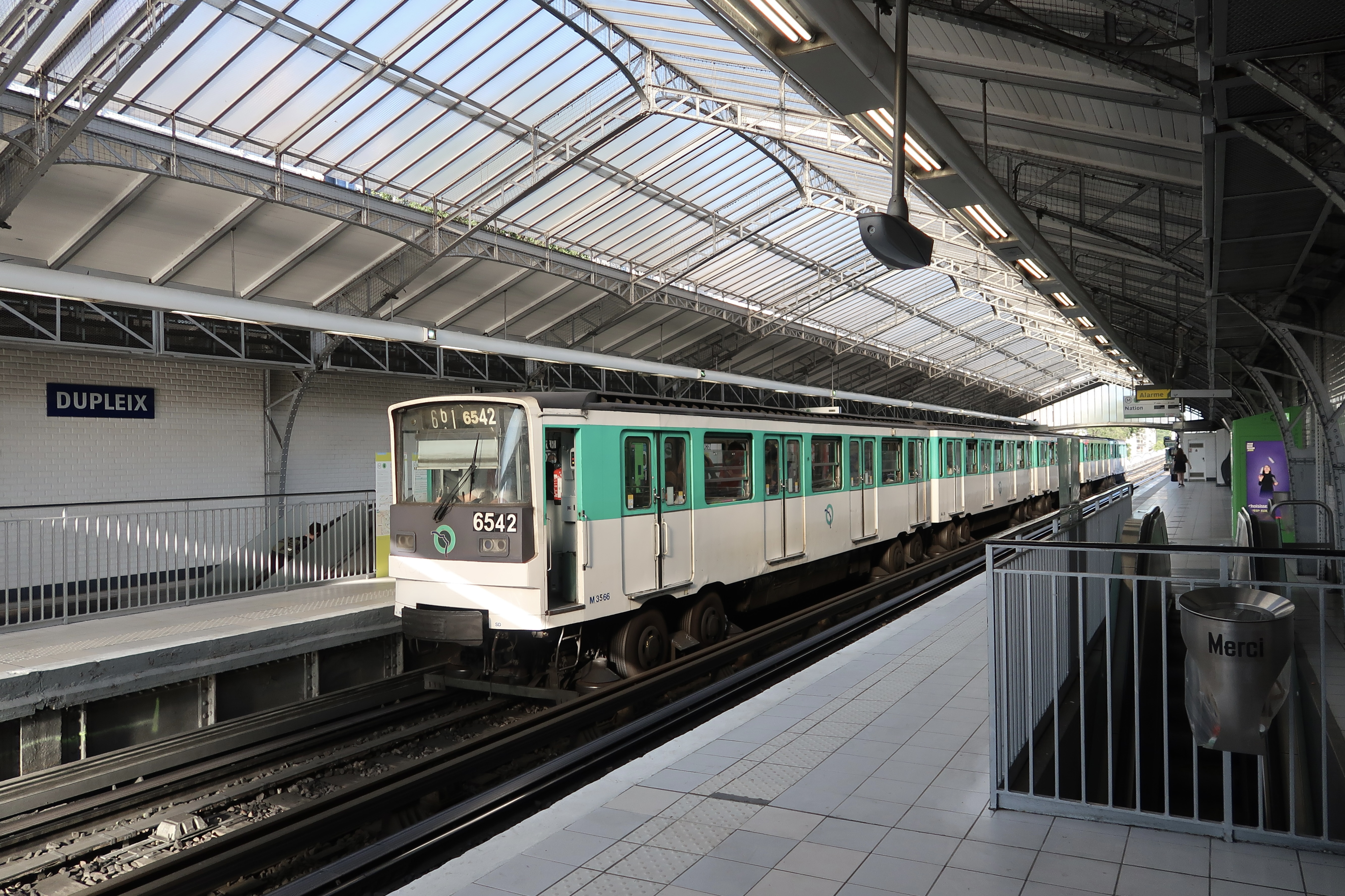
- MP 73 at Dupleix

General information
- Location: 15th arrondissement of Paris; Île-de-France; France
- Coordinates: 48°51′01″N 2°17′37″E
- System: Paris Métro station
- Owner: RATP
- Operator: RATP
- Line: Paris Metro Paris Metro Line 6
- Platforms: 2 (side platforms)
- Tracks: 2

Construction
- Accessible: No

Other information
- Station code: 17-07
- Fare zone: 1

History
- Opened: 24 April 1906

Passengers
- 2,028,963 (2021)

Services
| Preceding station | Paris Metro | Following station |
|---|---|---|
| Bir-Hakeim towards Charles de Gaulle–Étoile | Line 6 | La Motte-Picquet–Grenelle towards Nation |
Location
- Location within Paris

Dupleix (French pronunciation: [dyplɛks]) is an elevated station on Line 6 of the Paris Métro in the 15th arrondissement. The track and station form an elevated viaduct in the centre of the Boulevard de Grenelle. It is named after the nearby Rue Dupleix and Place Dupleix, a square commemorating Joseph François Dupleix (1697–1763), marquis of Landrecies and Paris, an administrator and coloniser of India. The station was the location of the Barrière de Grenelle, a gate built for the collection of taxation as part of the Wall of the Farmers-General; the gate was built between 1784 and 1788 before it was demolished in the 19th century.

== History ==
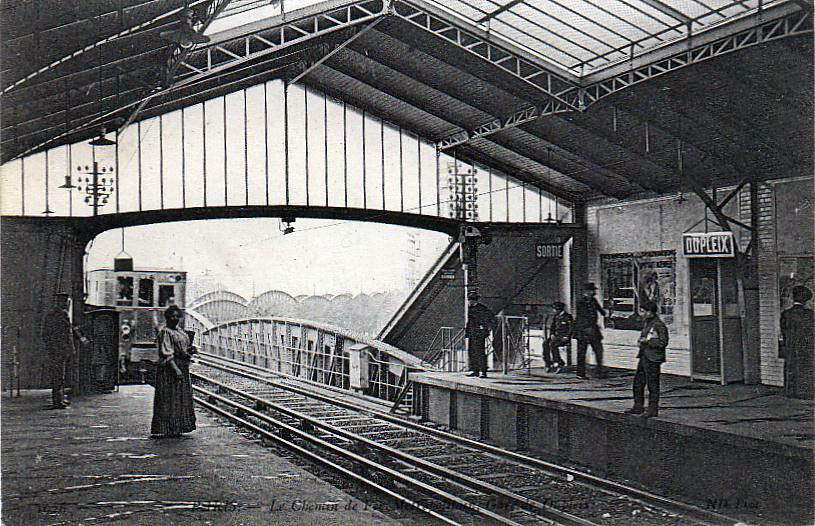
The station shortly after its opening

The station opened as part of the former Line 2 South on 24 April 1906, when it was extended from Passy to Place d'Italie. On 14 October 1907, Line 2 South was incorporated into Line 5. The station was then incorporated into Line 6 on 12 October 1942.

A manometer is affixed to of the pillars supporting the station, and is perhaps the last surviving public pressure gauge intended for searching for leaks on the city's water supply network.

In 2019, the station was used by 3,221,871 passengers, making it the 154th busiest of the Métro network out of 302 stations.

In 2020, the station was used by 1,839,499 passengers amidst the COVID-19 pandemic, making it the 131st busiest of the Métro network out of 305 stations.

In 2021, the station was used by 2,028,963 passengers, making it the 176th busiest of the Métro network out of 305 stations.

== Passenger services ==
=== Access ===
The station has two entrances:

- Access 1: rue Viala
- Access 2: rue Desaix

=== Station layout ===
| Platform level | Side platform, doors will open on the right |
| Platform level | toward Charles de Gaulle – Étoile | ← toward Charles de Gaulle–Étoile (Bir-Hakeim) |
| Platform level | toward Nation | toward Nation (La Motte-Picquet – Grenelle) → |
| Platform level | Side platform, doors will open on the right |
| 1F | Mezzanine |
Street Level

=== Platforms ===
The station is elevated and has a standard configuration with 2 tracks surrounded by 2 side platforms.

=== Other connections ===
The station is also served by line 42 of the RATP bus network.

== Nearby ==
- Marché de Grenelle (a market open on Sunday and Wednesday mornings)

== Gallery ==
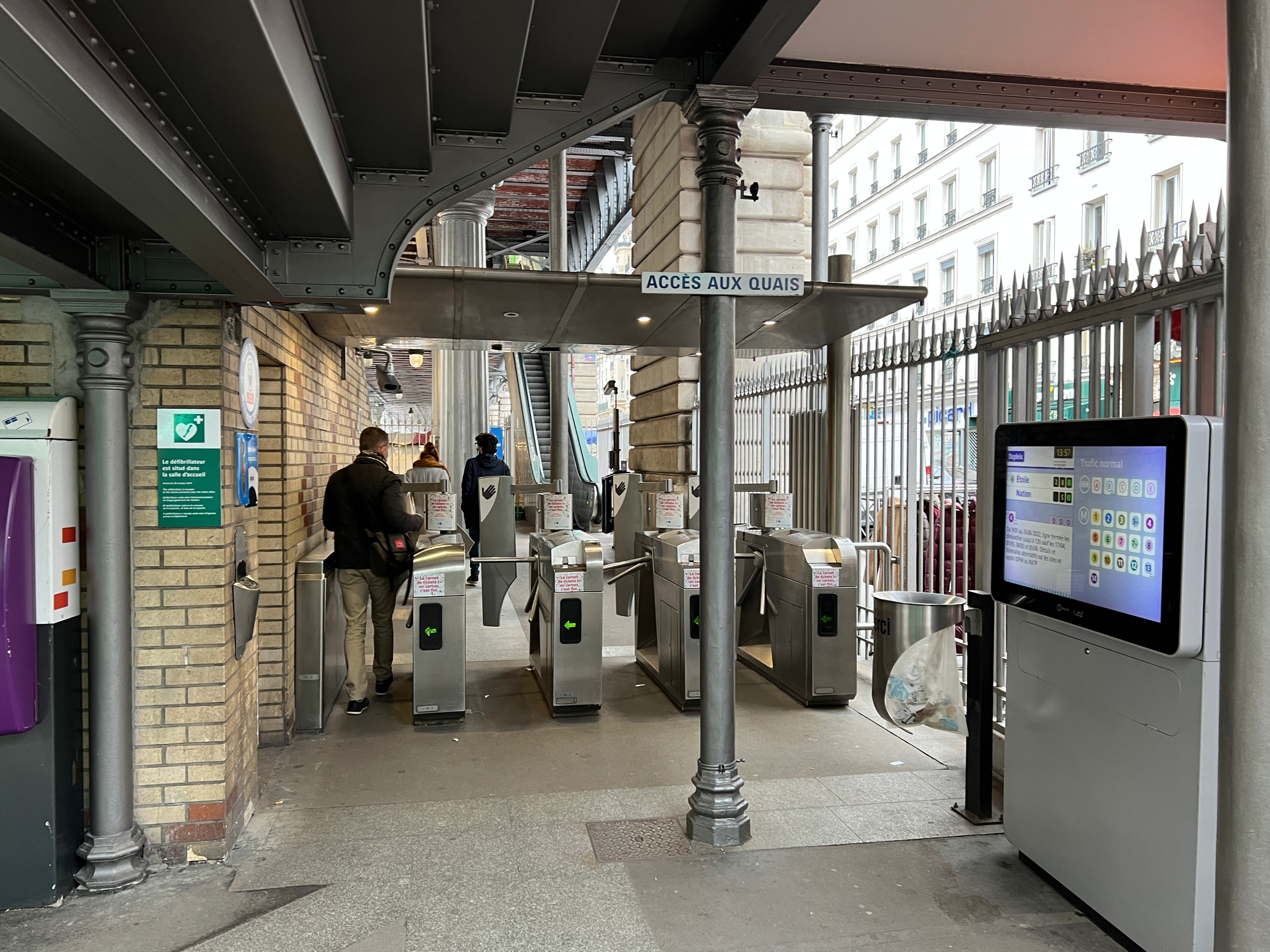
Ticket barriers

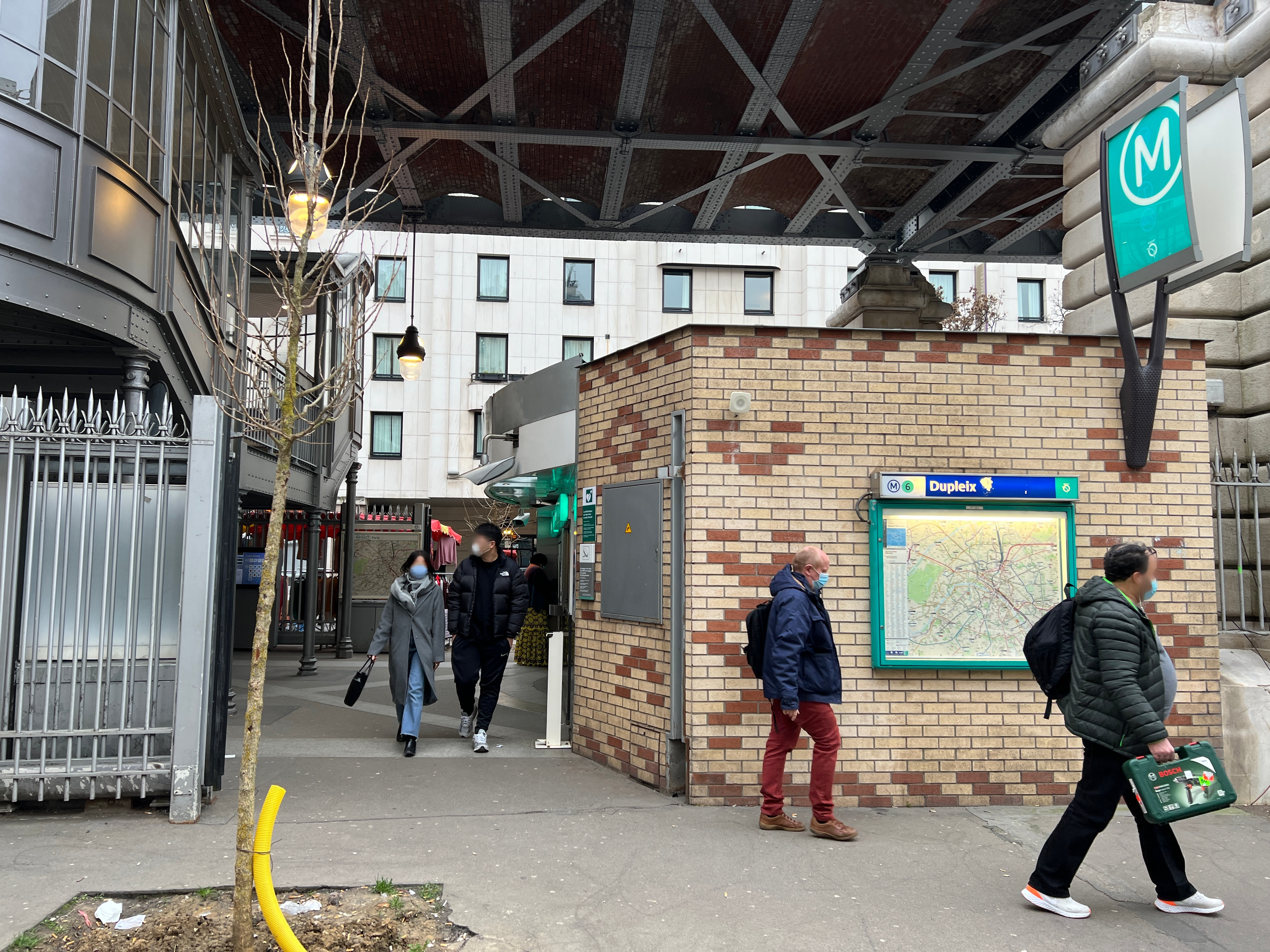
One of the accesses

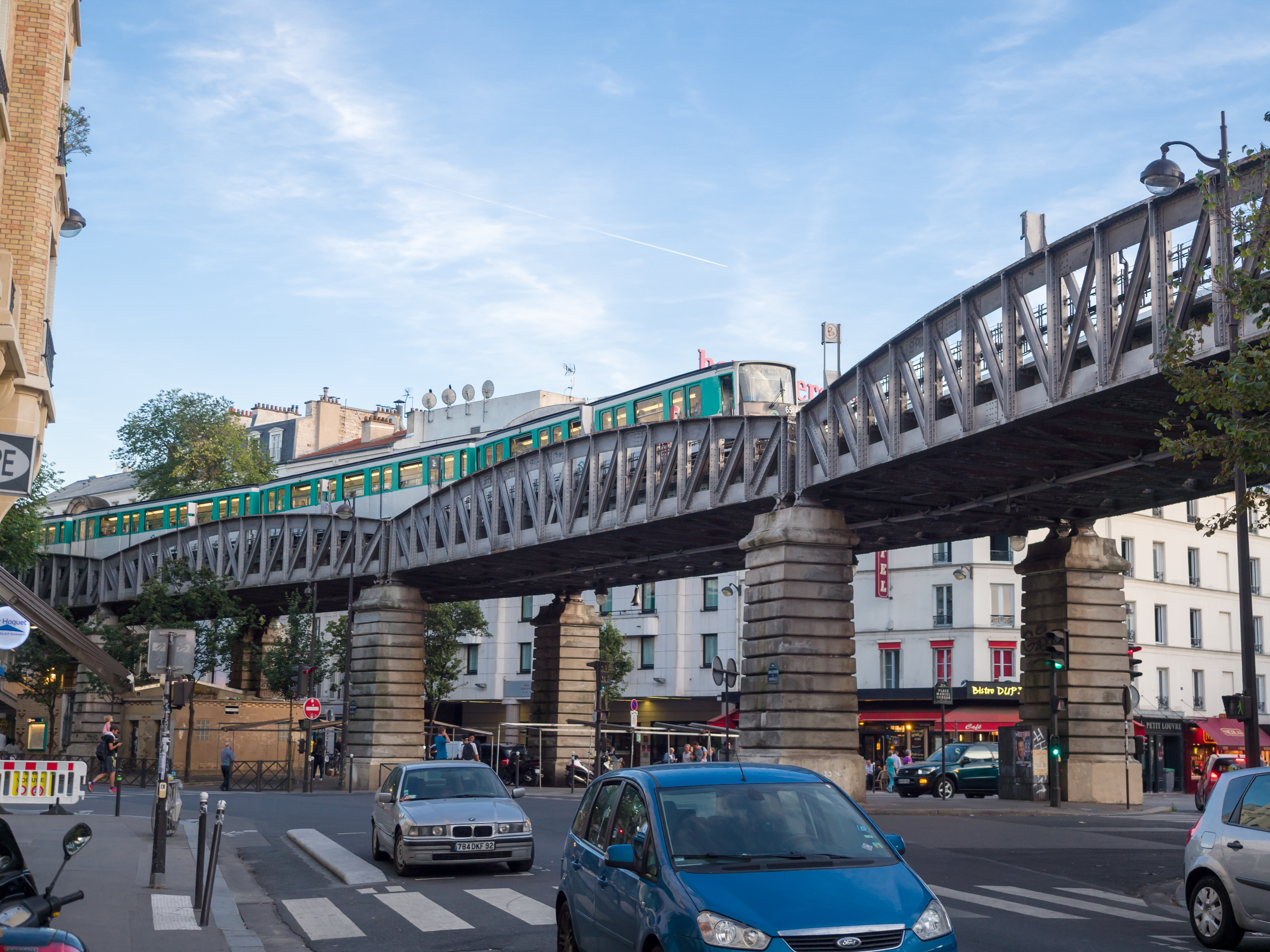
The viaduct just north of the station

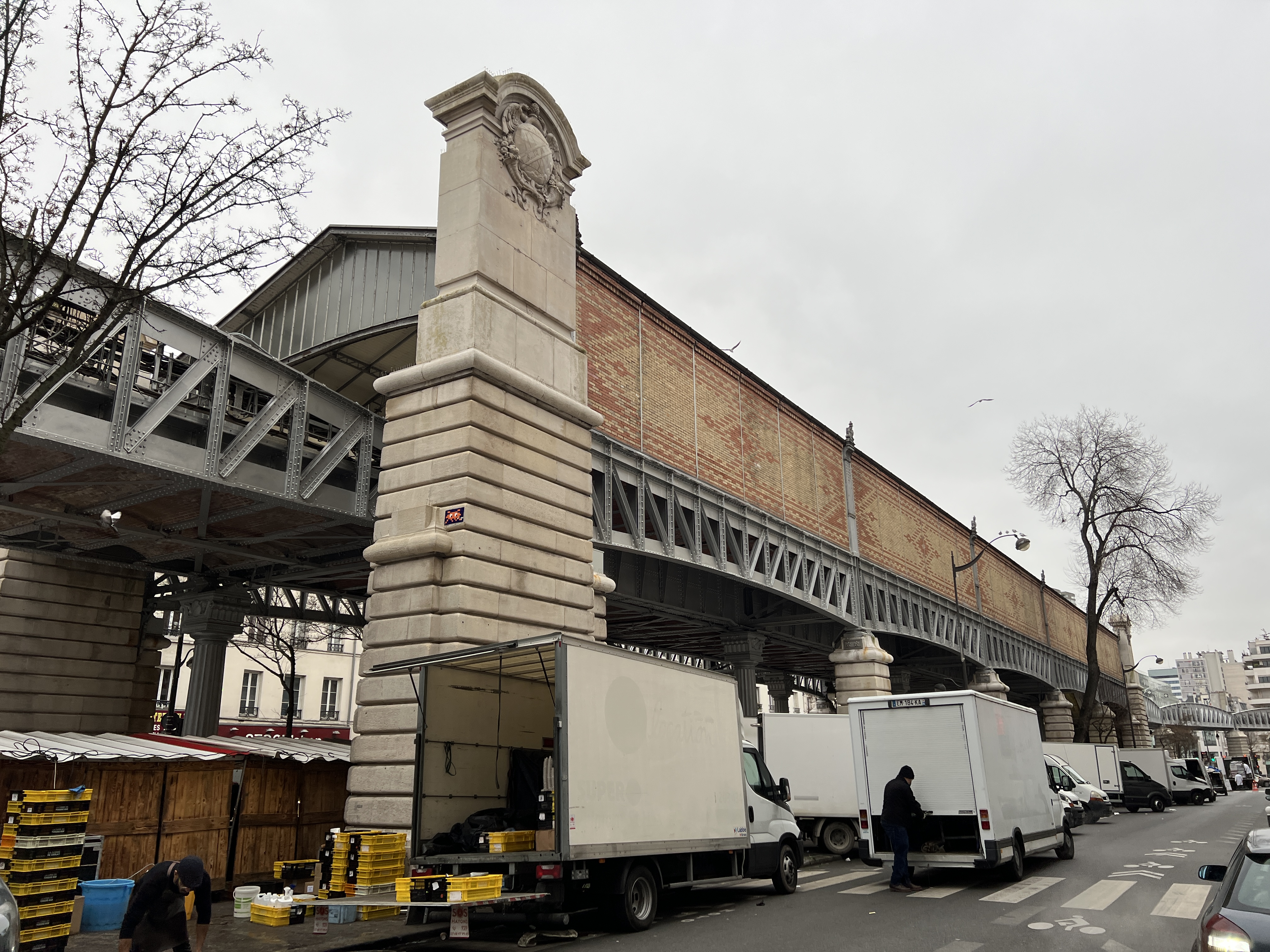
The station from outside

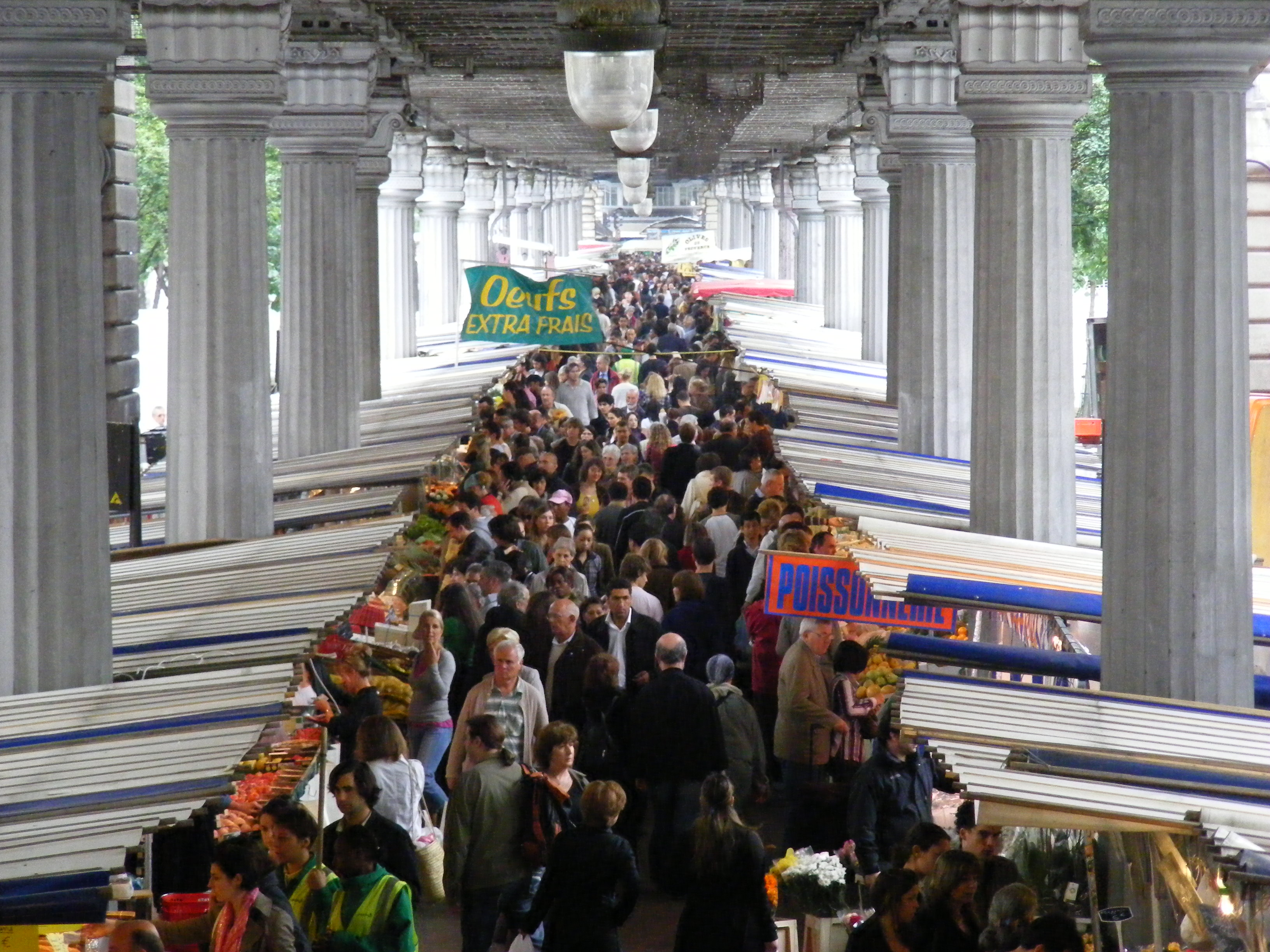
View of Marché de Grenelle from Dupleix

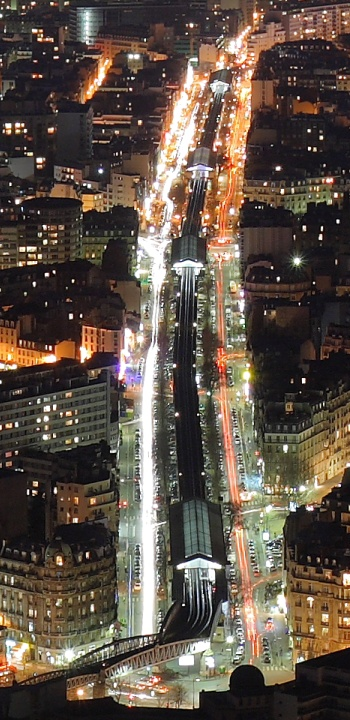
View of the viaduct from above. Dupleix is at the bottom.

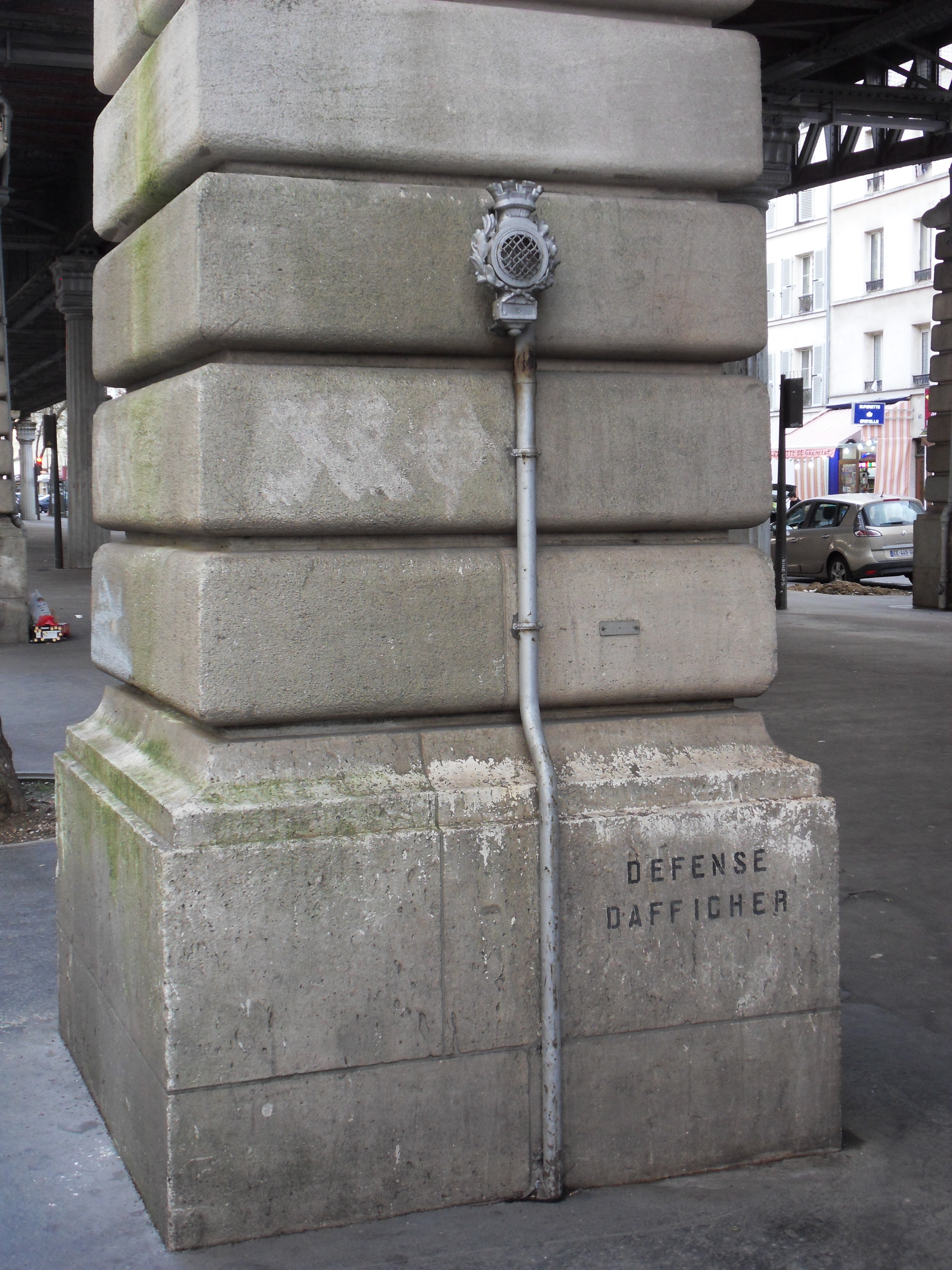
Manometer on one of the pillars at Dupleix
