= Decauville railway at Láchar =

Coordinates: 37.199470°N 3.834367°W

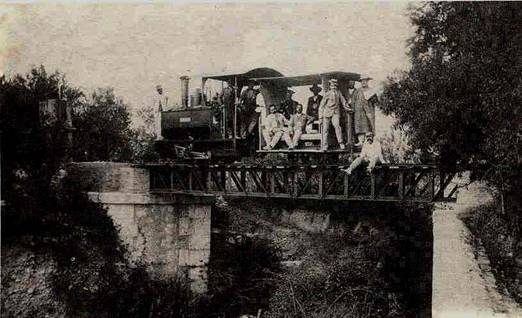
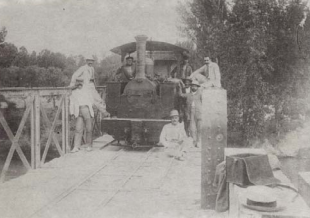
- Alcañices on the Arroyo de Escoznar bridge, ca 1890 Alcañices on the Eiffel Bridge over the Río Genil, ca. 1890

Technical
- Line length: 22 km (14 mi)
- Track gauge: 600 mm (1 ft 11 5/8 in)
Route map
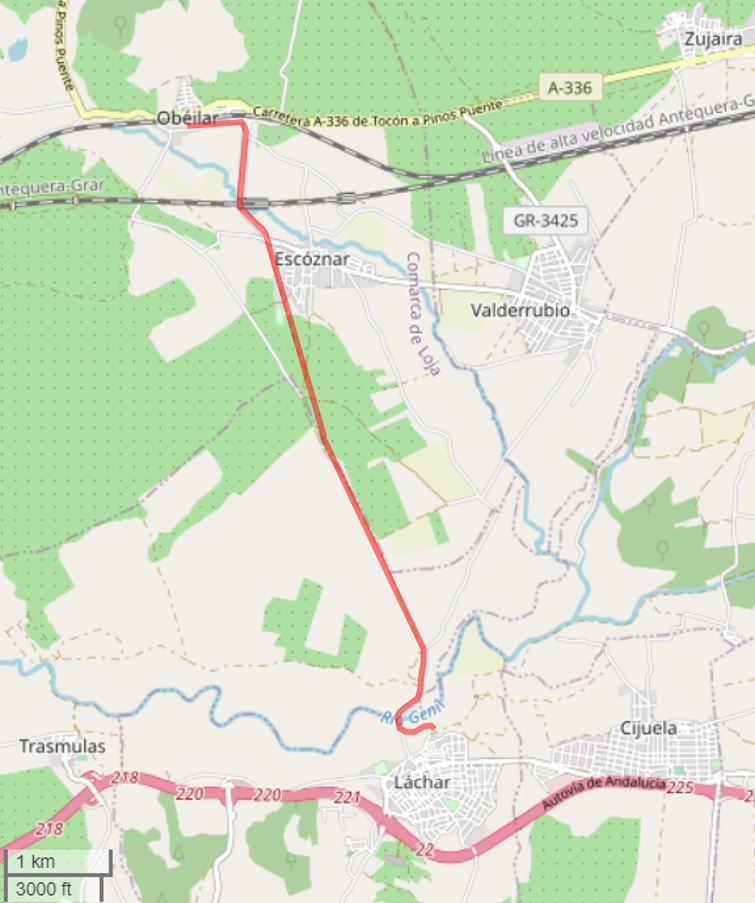
Route of the track superimposed onto a modern map

The Decauville railway at Láchar was an 8.3 km (5.2 mi) long narrow-gauge railway with a gauge of 600 mm (1 ft 11 5/8 in) from Íllora-Láchar railway station via the Eiffel Bridge to the sugar mill in Láchar.

== Route ==
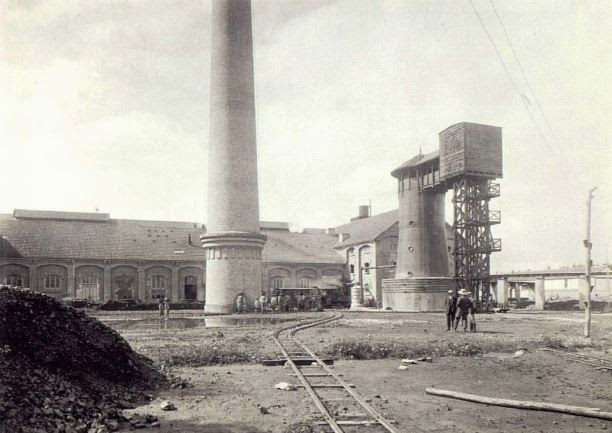
One of the Decauville locomotives behind the sugar mill of Señorío de Lachar, 1906

The 8.3 kilometres (5.2 mi) long Decauville railway with rails weighing 9,5 kg/m (19 lbs/yard) ran over two metal bridges, of which one was designed Gustave Eiffel and erected by Fives-Lille. The track on the site of the sugar mill was 172 metres (564 ft) long. It ended at a turntable at the western end of the site.

== History ==
Growing sugar beets and producing sugar from them caused a major structural change in the Vega de Granada at the end of the 19th century. The landlord and businessman Julio Quesada y Piedrola, Duke of San Pedro de Galatino, Count of Benalúa and Señorío de Láchar planned and contracted the sugar mill and the industrial railway during or shortly after the Exposition Universelle (1889) in Paris. It was put into service in 1890.

King Alfonso XIII, a personal friend of the Count of Benalúa, visited and used the railway to travel to the sugar factory. It was closed in 1926, due to the crisis in the sugar industry.

== Rolling stock ==
There were two Decauville steam locomotives and 46 waggons of different types.

No	Boiler test	Wheel arrangement	Gauge	Empty weight	Name	References
N° 106	21 May 1890	0-4-0T	600 mm (1 ft 11 5/8 in)	5 t	Alcañices	
N° 130	22 June 1891	0-4-0T	600 mm (1 ft 11 5/8 in)	5 t	Benalúa	
