= Tour Eiffel (disambiguation) =

La Tour Eiffel or the Eiffel Tower is a wrought-iron lattice tower on the Champ de Mars in Paris, France.

Tour Eiffel may also refer to:

- La Tour Eiffel (Hopi Hari), a drop tower at the Hopi Hari amusement park in Vinhedo, São Paulo, Brazil
- Le Tour Eiffel (EP), a 2007 extended play record by Siouxsie
- Champ de Mars – Tour Eiffel station, a transit station in Paris, France
- Tour Eiffel Bridge, a bridge in Gatineau, Quebec, Canada
- "The Eiffel Tour", a 2009 concert tour by Art vs. Science
- La tour Eiffel, an 1898 painting by Henri Rousseau

== See also ==
- Eiffel (disambiguation)
- Eiffel Tower (disambiguation)
- List of songs about Paris, listing several songs named "Tour Eiffel"
- Ramada Paris Tour Eiffel, a hotel
