= Bir Hakeim (disambiguation) =

Bir Hakeim is an oasis in Libya.

Bir Hakeim may also refer to:

- Battle of Bir Hakeim, during the Second World War
- Pont de Bir-Hakeim, a bridge in Paris, named after the former
- Bir-Hakeim station, a Paris Metro station
