= Eiffel Tower (disambiguation) =

The Eiffel Tower is an iron lattice tower in Paris.

Eiffel Tower or similar may also refer to:

== Structures ==
- Eiffel Tower (Paris, Tennessee), a 1:20 scale replica of the original
- Eiffel Tower (Paris, Texas), a scale model of the Eiffel Tower in Paris
- Eiffel Tower (Six Flags), replicas at Kings Dominion and one at Kings Island
- Eiffel Tower, a one-half scale model at Paris Las Vegas
- Tour Eiffel Bridge, small but ornate bridge in Gatineau, Quebec, Canada

== Other uses ==
- Eiffel Tower (Delaunay series), a cycle of paintings and drawings of the Eiffel Tower
- Eiffel Tower cake
- EiffelTowers Nijmegen, a Dutch basketball club based in Nijmegen
- Heroes Den Bosch (previously EiffelTowers Den Bosch), a Dutch professional basketball club based in 's-Hertogenbosch

== See also ==
- Tour Eiffel (disambiguation) (French: Eiffel Tower)), various items called "Tour Eiffel" in English
- List of Eiffel Tower replicas
- Eiffel (disambiguation)
- Tower (disambiguation)
