= Musée Clemenceau =

House museum in Paris, France

Coordinates: 48°51′33″N 2°17′6.3″E

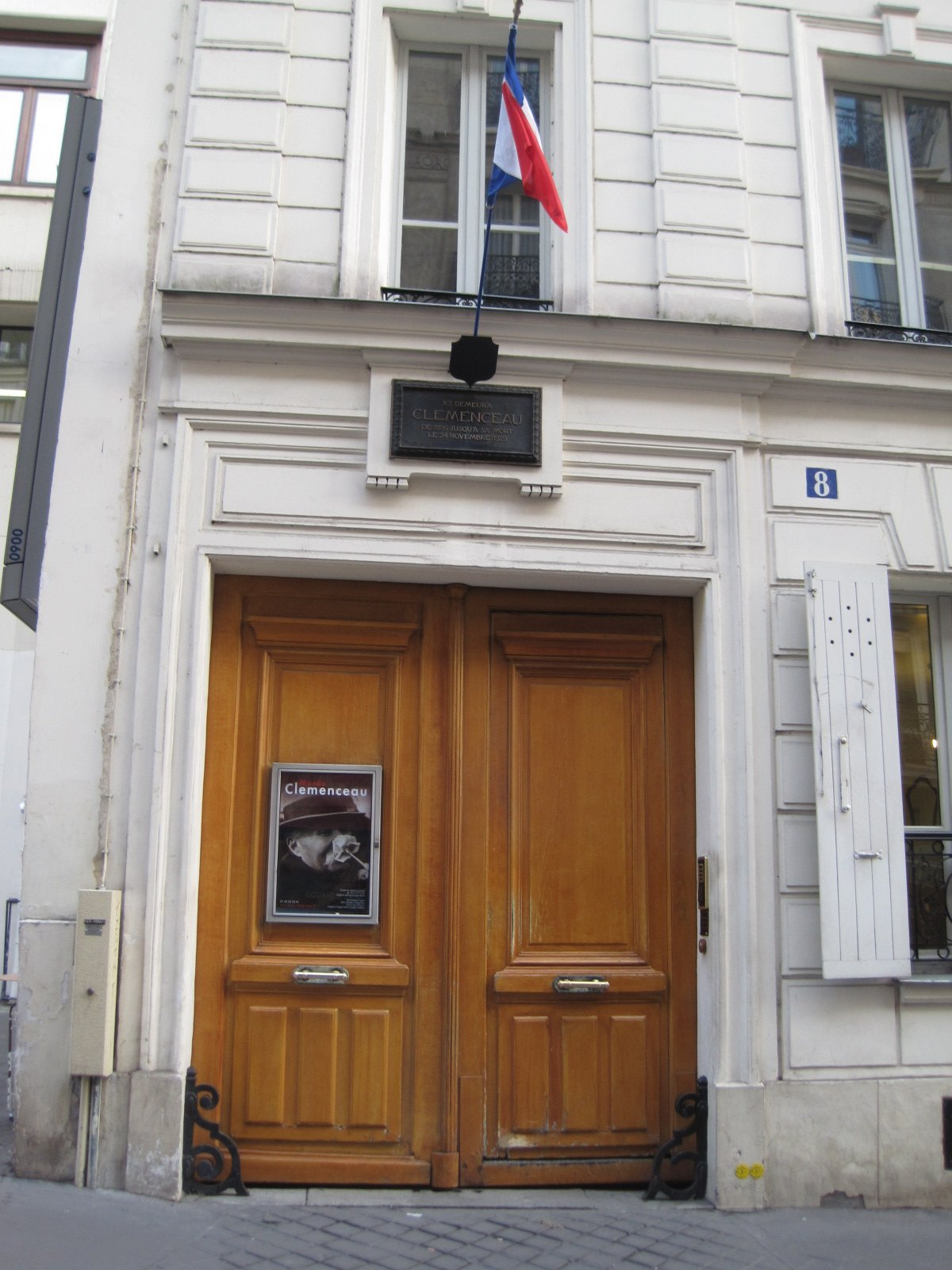
Entrance to the Musée Clemenceau

The Musée Clemenceau (French pronunciation: [myze klemɑ̃so]) is a house museum located in the 16th arrondissement at 8, rue Benjamin Franklin, Paris, France. It is open in the afternoons of Tuesday through Saturday, except in August; an admission fee is charged. The closest métro stations are Passy and Trocadéro.

The museum preserves the apartment and garden of Georges Clemenceau (1841–1929), French statesman and writer, who lived there from 1895 until his death. The museum opened to the public in 1931, and preserves the apartment as it was on the day of his death. Its first floor exhibits many objects reflecting Clemenceau's life and work, including the famous coat and gaiters he wore during his visits to the front in World War I, as well as portraits, photos, books, newspapers, and manuscripts.

== See also ==
- List of museums in Paris
