= Lycée Gustave Eiffel =

Lycée Gustave Eiffel may refer to:

Schools in France:

- Lycée Gustave Eiffel - Bordeaux
- Lycée Gustave Eiffel - Cachan
- Lycée Gustave Eiffel - Dijon
- Lycée Gustave Eiffel (Gagny)
- Lycée Professionnel Gustave Eiffel - Massy
- Lycée Gustave Eiffel - Reims
- Lycée Gustave Eiffel - Varennes-sur-Seine
- Lycée Gustave Eiffel - Armentières

Schools outside France:

- Gustave Eiffel French School of Budapest

== See also ==
- Gustave Eiffel University (est. 2020), Champs-sur-Marne, Marne la Vallée, France
- Eiffel School of Management (est. 2007), Creteil, France
- Eiffel (disambiguation)
