= Bir-Hakeim station =

Metro station in Paris, France

Bir-Hakeim
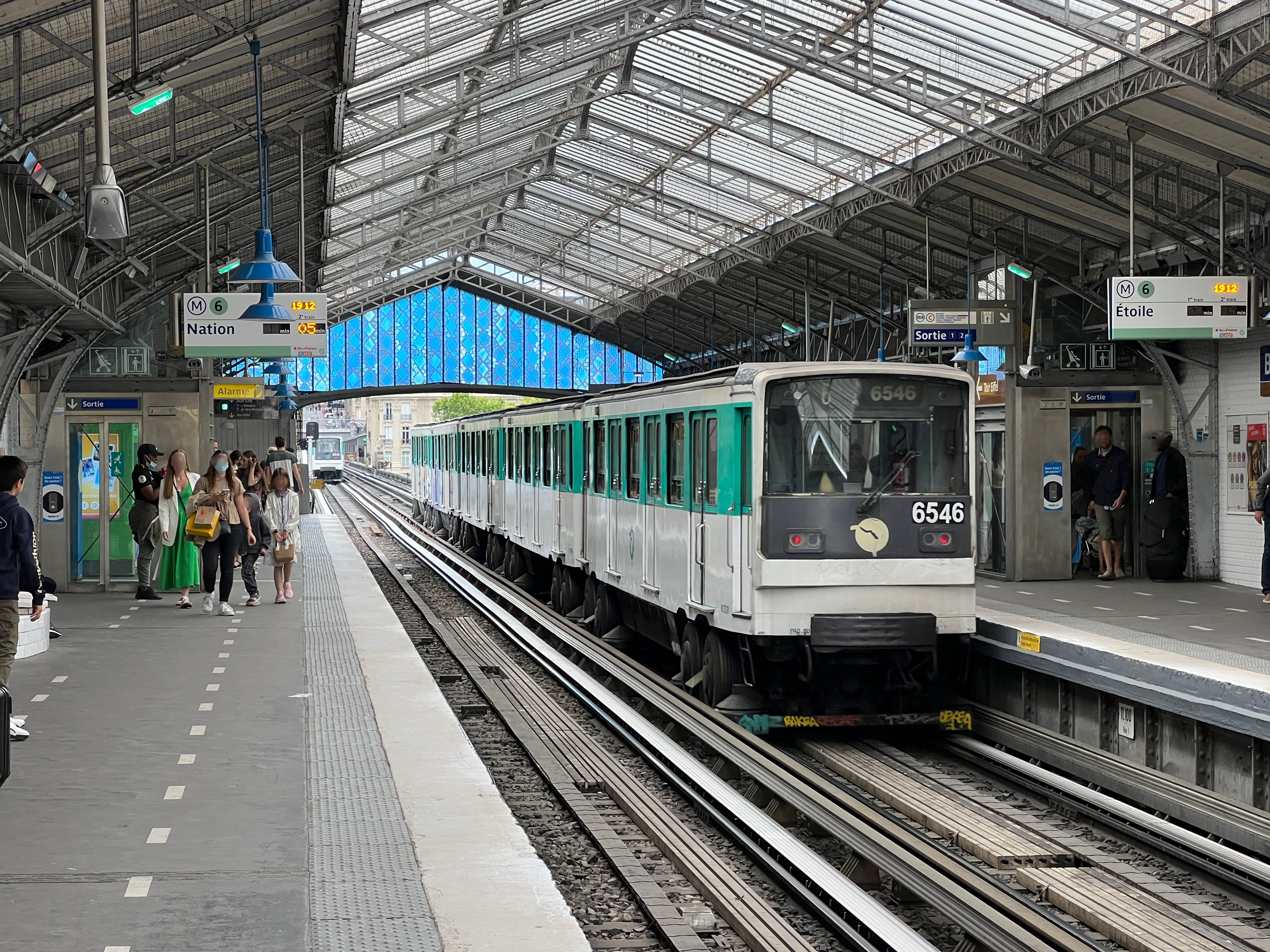

General information
- Other names: Bir-Hakeim — Tour Eiffel
- Location: 15th arrondissement of Paris; Île-de-France; France
- Coordinates: 48°51′14″N 2°17′22″E
- System: Paris Métro station
- Owner: RATP
- Operator: RATP
- Line: Paris Metro Paris Metro Line 6
- Platforms: 2 (side platforms)
- Tracks: 2

Construction
- Accessible: Yes

Other information
- Fare zone: 1

History
- Opened: 24 April 1906
- Former names: Grenelle (1906–1949)

Services
Preceding station	Paris Metro	Following station
Passy towards Charles de Gaulle–Étoile	Line 6	Dupleix towards Nation
Connections to other stations
Preceding station	RER	Following station
Avenue du Président Kennedy towards Pontoise	RER C transfer at Champ de Mars–Tour Eiffel	Pont de l'Alma towards Massy-Palaiseau, Dourdan-la-Forêt or Saint-Martin-d'Étampes
Javel towards Versailles Château Rive Gauche or Saint-Quentin-en-Yvelines	RER C transfer at Champ de Mars–Tour Eiffel	Pont de l'Alma towards Massy-Palaiseau, Dourdan-la-Forêt or Saint-Martin-d'Étampes
Location
- Location within Paris

Bir-Hakeim (French pronunciation: [biʁ akɛm]) is an elevated station on Line 6 of the Paris Métro on the Boulevard de Grenelle in the 15th arrondissement. It is situated on the left bank of the Pont de Bir-Hakeim over the Seine and is the closest Métro station to the Eiffel Tower. After being built in 1906 as "Grenelle", it was renamed together with the bridge to commemorate the World War II battle of Bir Hakeim. The signs on the station walls now say "Bir-Hakeim — Tour Eiffel".

The station is above the RER C line and the station Champ de Mars–Tour Eiffel is within walking distance.

== History ==
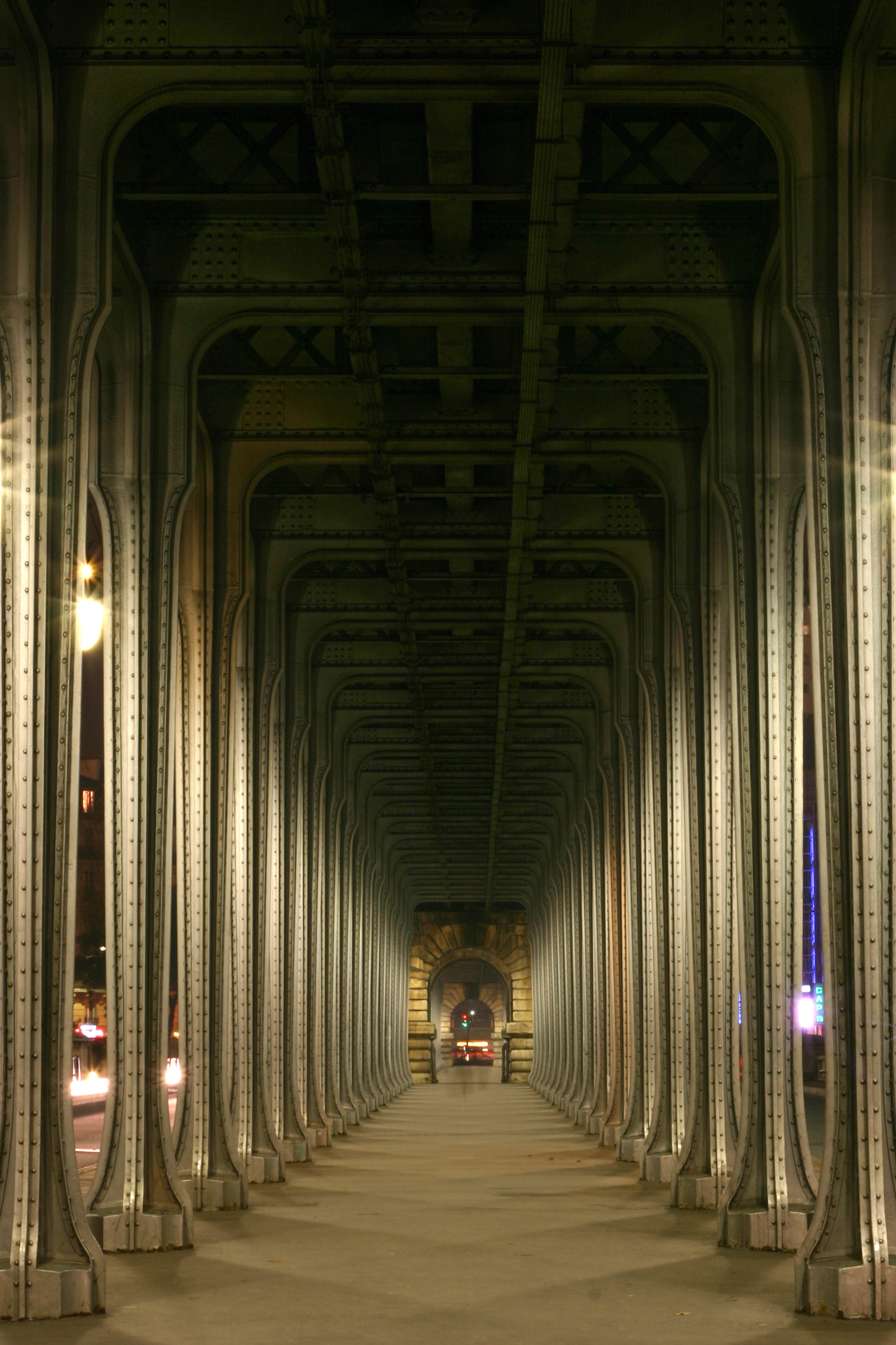
Passy viaduct on Bir-Hakeim Bridge

The station opened as part of the former Line 2 South on 24 April 1906, when it was extended from Passy to Place d'Italie. On 14 October 1907 Line 2 South was incorporated into Line 5. It was incorporated into Line 6 on 12 October 1942.

The station was called "Grenelle" until 18 June 1949, when it was renamed to commemorate the battle of Bir Hakeim. A commemorative panel is situated at the entrance of the platform for trains traveling towards Nation. The station was the location of the Barrière de la Cunette, a gate built for the collection of taxation as part of the Wall of the Farmers-General; the gate was built between 1784 and 1788 and demolished in the 19th century.

== Passenger services ==
=== Access ===
The station has three entrances established on the central median of the Boulevard de Grenelle:

- access 1 - Rue Nélaton leading to the right of numbers 6 and 11 of the boulevard near the former street;
- access 2 - Place des Martyrs-Juifs - Tour Eiffel opposite the Place des Martyrs-Juifs-du-Vélodrome-d'Hiver, to the right of Nos. 2 and 3 of the boulevard;
- access 3 - Boulevard de Grenelle is located opposite nos. 2 and 3 of the boulevard.

Each opens onto a communal area under the viaduct from which access to the platforms is via fixed stairs, escalators, or elevators.

=== Station layout ===
Platform level	Side platform, doors will open on the right
Platform level	toward Charles de Gaulle–Étoile	← toward Charles de Gaulle–Étoile (Passy)
Platform level	toward Nation	toward Nation (Dupleix) →
Platform level	Side platform, doors will open on the right

1F	Mezzanine for platform connection

Street Level

=== Platforms ===
Bir-Hakeim is an elevated station with a standard configuration. It has two platforms separated by the metro tracks, all covered by a glass roof in the marquee style of the stations of the time. The vertical walls are covered with bevelled white ceramic tiles on the inside, and bricks with geometric patterns on the outside. The advertising frames are made of white ceramic and the name of the station is inscribed in Parisine font on enamelled plaques. The seats are a white Motte style arranged on convex-shaped benches covered with flat white ceramic tiles. The lighting is semi-direct, projected on the floor by blue ceiling lights, on the walls by partially concealed lighting tubes and on the framework by blue light projectors.

When it was renovated in 2008, the station received a work by the American visual artist Judy Ledgerwood, Night and Day. It is a double stained-glass window placed on the glass roof above the tracks at each end of the station. The work was offered to the RATP in exchange for a Guimard entrance for the Van Buren Street station of the Chicago subway.

=== Other connections ===
The station connects to the Champ de Mars–Tour Eiffel station on RER C line via an underground connecting corridor.

In addition, it is served by line 30 of the RATP Bus Network.

== Places of interest ==
It is the station closest to the Eiffel Tower. Near the station is the site of the former Vélodrome d'hiver (Winter Velodrome or "Vel' d'Hiv"), which was famous for its cycling competitions but became infamous as the first place of detention for thousands of Parisian Jews who were rounded up by the police on 16 and 17 July 1942 before their deportation to Nazi concentration camps. The velodrome was destroyed in 1960 in the course of work done on the bank of the Seine (Front de Seine). A commemorative monument has been raised near the south side of the station, above the tracks of the RER C.

In the film Last Tango in Paris, Maria Schneider's character has an argument which leads to a physical altercation with her boyfriend in the Bir-Hakeim station.

== Gallery ==
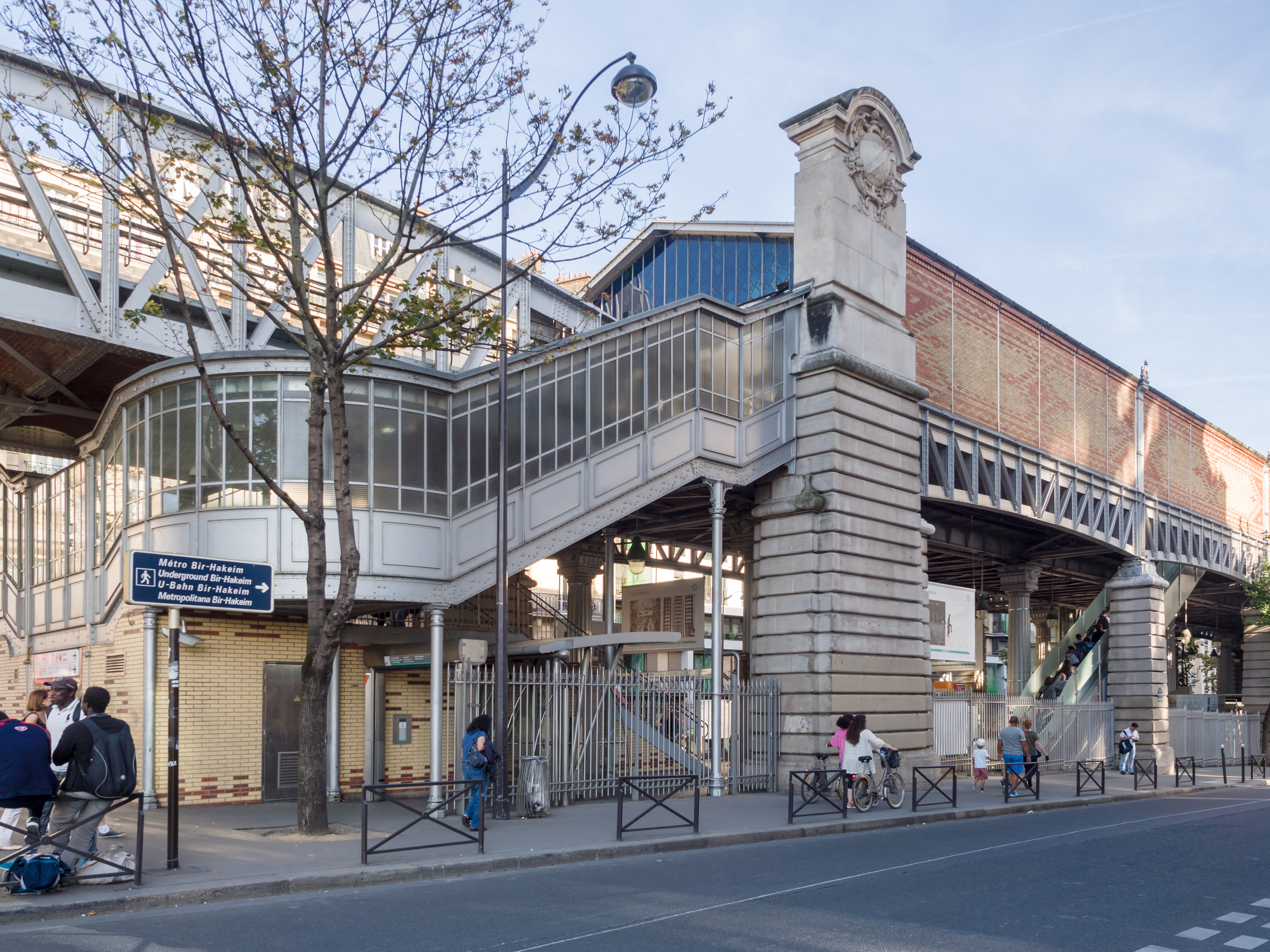
Station view

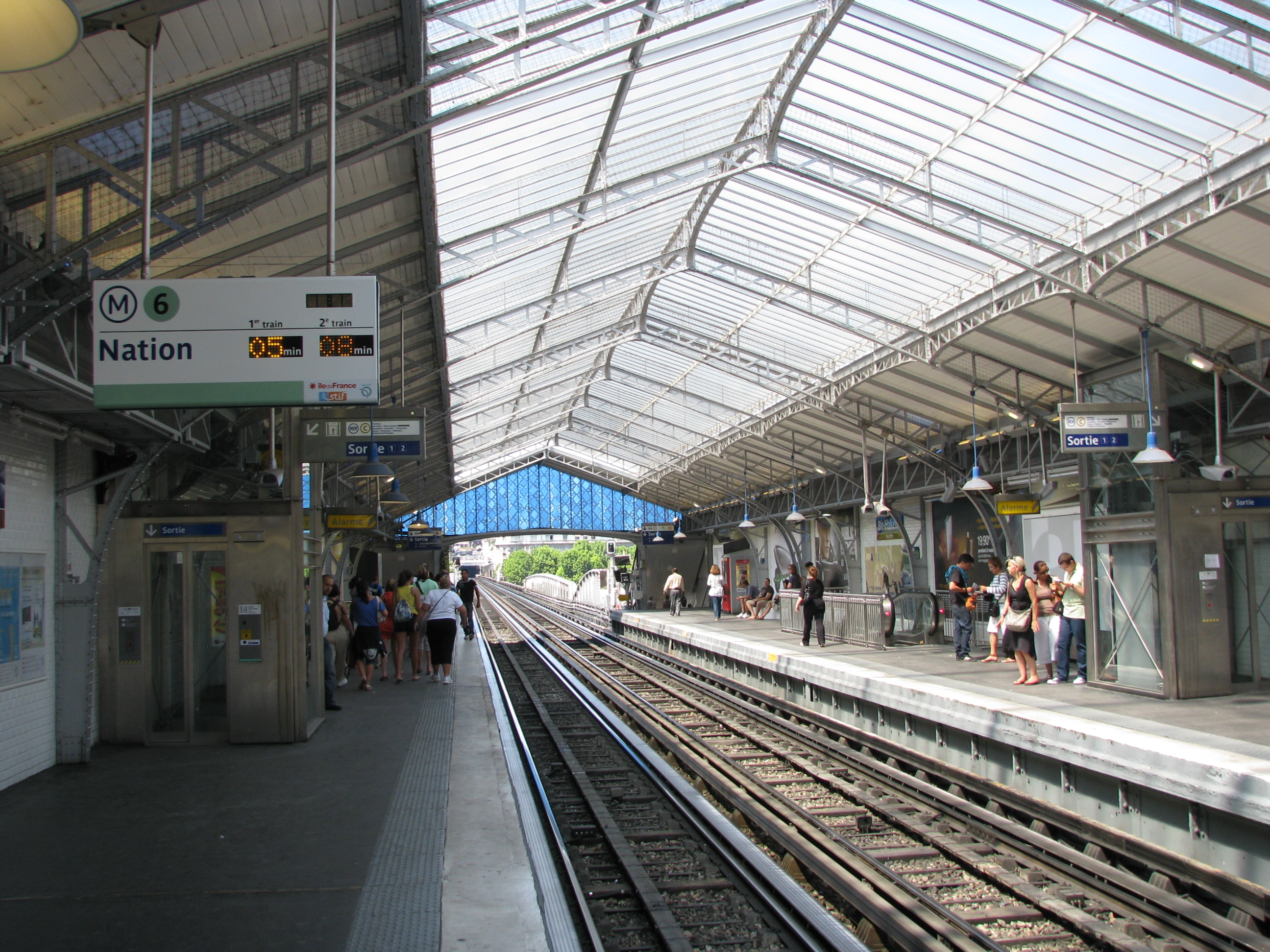
Line 6 platforms at Bir-Hakeim

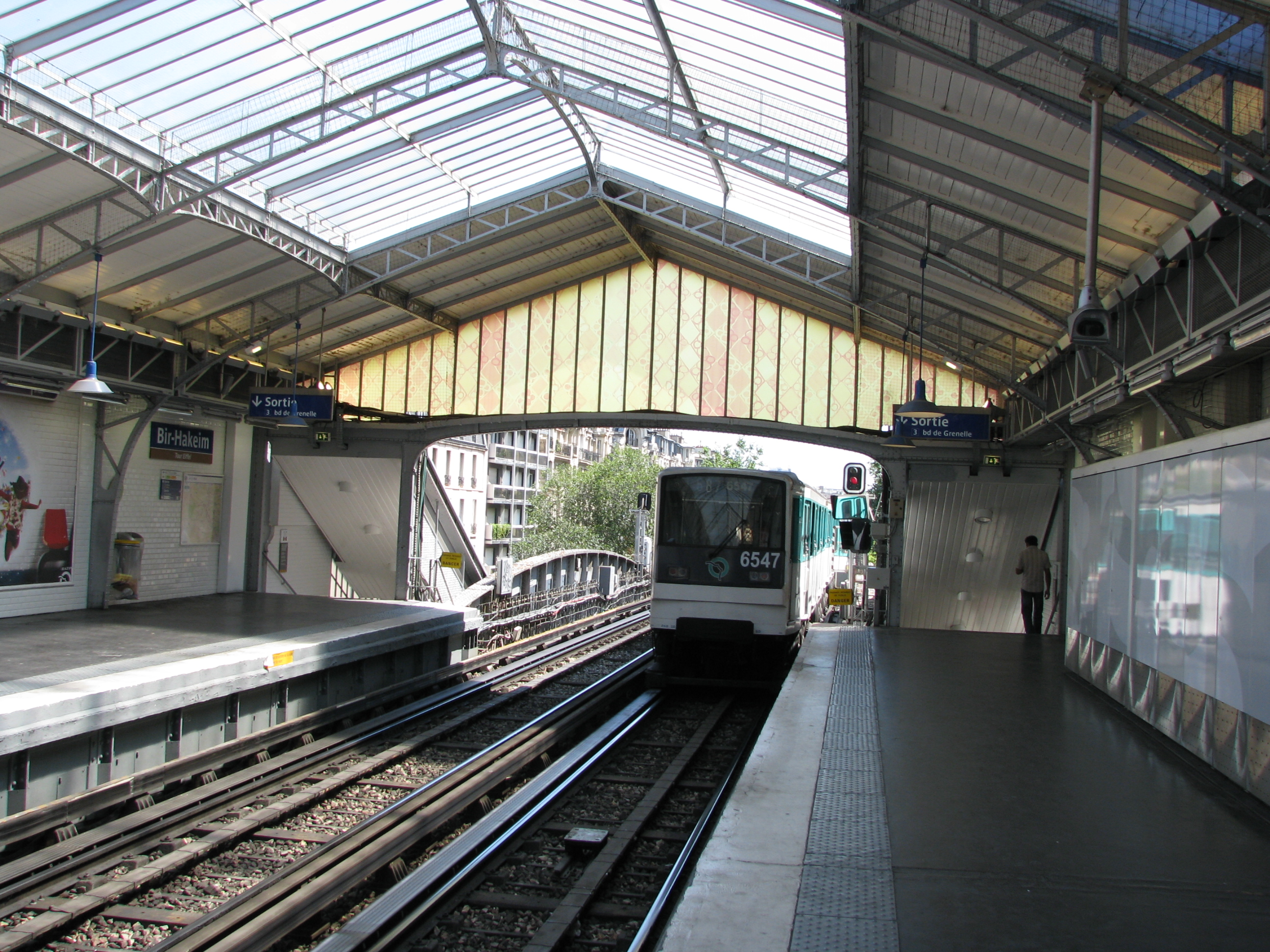
MP 73 rolling stock on Line 6 at Bir-Hakeim
