= Eiffel Bridge, Láchar =

Eiffel Bridge Puente Eiffel
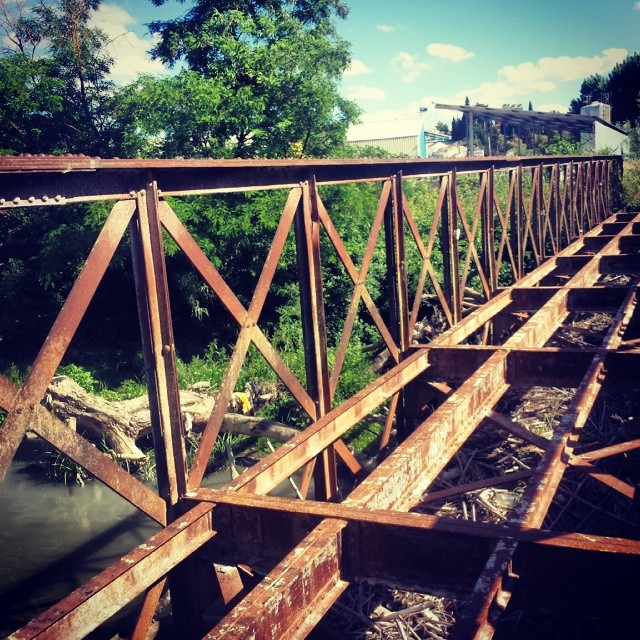
- Coordinates: 37°12′01″N 3°50′11″W
- Crosses: Genil River
- Locale: Láchar, Granada, Spain
- Named for: Gustave Eiffel
- Owner: Láchar local government

Characteristics
- Material: Iron

History
- Opened: 1897
- Closed: 2006

The Eiffel Bridge (Spanish: Puente Eiffel) is an iron bridge situated between the Spanish municipalities of Lachar and Pinos Puente. It was built in the 1897 by the studio of Gustave Eiffel. It's considered the last vestige of the Industrial Revolution in Vega de Granada.

== History ==
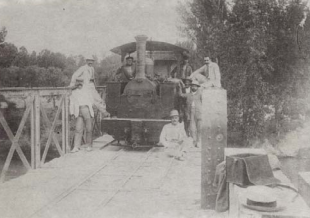
Decauville locomotive Alcañices of the Decauville railway at Láchar on the Eiffel bridge

The bridge was built in 1897, commissioned by Don Julio Quesada-Cañaveral to connect the station of Íllora by the Decauville railway at Láchar with two important factories that the nobleman had in Láchar, thus becoming the second railway of the province of Granada.

Years later, the railroad disappeared and the bridge was used decades later by cars as a means of communication between Láchar, Daimuz Bajo, Valderrubio, Fuente Vaqueros and Escóznar. In 2006 it became unusable after the accident of a vehicle that caused the breakage of a small part of the support and the subsequent collapse of the entire structure. Since 2007 there's another bridge built next to the previous one.
