= Paris-Est Faculty of law =

French law university

Paris-Est Faculty of Law
- Faculté de droit de Paris-Est
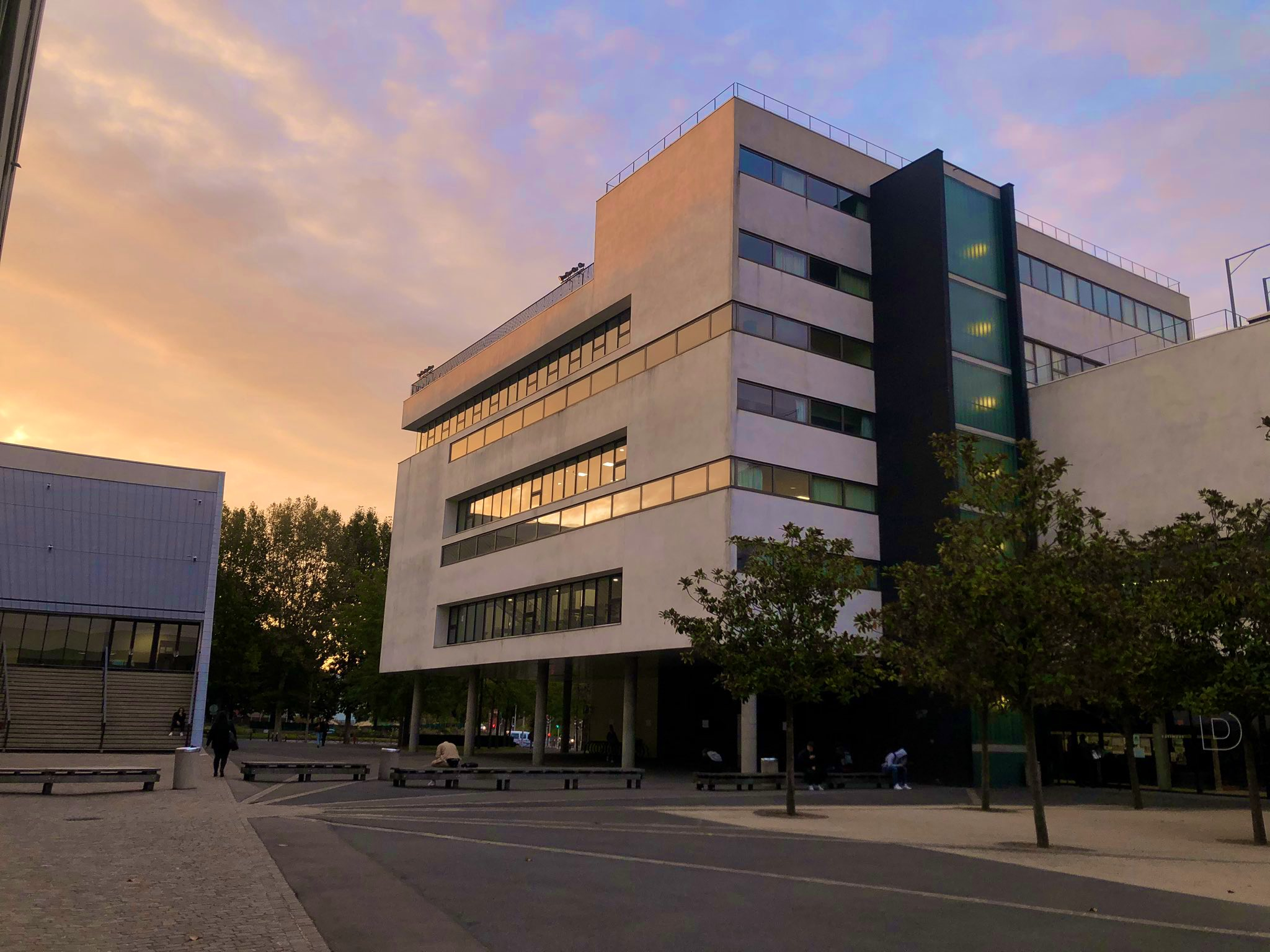
- Motto: Respondere, agere, cavere
- Established: 1967
- Affiliations: Paris-East Créteil University
- Director: Laurent Gamet
- Academic staff: 250
- Students: 4 000
- Location: Créteil, France

The Paris-Est Faculty of Law (French: Faculté de droit de Paris-Est) is a French institution of higher education. It is part of the Paris-East Créteil University (UPEC, Paris-XII).

== Historical background ==
The faculty of law was founded in 1967 in Saint-Maur-des-Fossés, and opened its doors to students in 1969. The first class, born of the deconcentration of the Sorbonne, numbered 2,500 students. UPEC was born on 21 March 1970, when the Faculty of Law and Economics joined forces with the multi-disciplinary center in Créteil, which included the young Faculty of Medicine in Val-de-Marne.

On 16 January 2006 the Faculty of Law inaugurated its new campus in the L'Échat district of Créteil. These new 15,000m^{2} premises were built by architect Michel Rémon on land transferred to the State by the city of Créteil. The old Saint-Maur-des-Fossés campus, in which asbestos was discovered in 1997, was demolished in 2016.

In 2020 UPEC's Faculty of Law came in fifth in the overall Thotis ranking of law schools, covering professional integration, university attractiveness, equal opportunities and academic success on graduation. It is also the leading law school in the Paris region in terms of equal opportunity.

== Deans ==
The position of dean is held by Laurent Gamet, full professor of private law and criminal sciences. From 2008 to 2017 this position was held by public law professor Jean-Jacques Israël, and from 2017 to 2021 by legal history professor Alain Desrayaud.

Deans since 1971
Time	Name	Field
1971–1979	Guillaume Matringe	legal history
1979–1985	François Gianviti	private law
1985–1989	Jacqueline Morand-Deviller	public law
1989–1993	Jean-Bernard Auby	public law
1993–1999	Louis Caillet	legal history
1999–2008	Nicole Guimezanes	private law
2008–2017	Jean-Jacques Israël	public law
2017–2021	Alain Desrayaud	legal history
2021–	Laurent Gamet	private law

== Faculty teachings ==
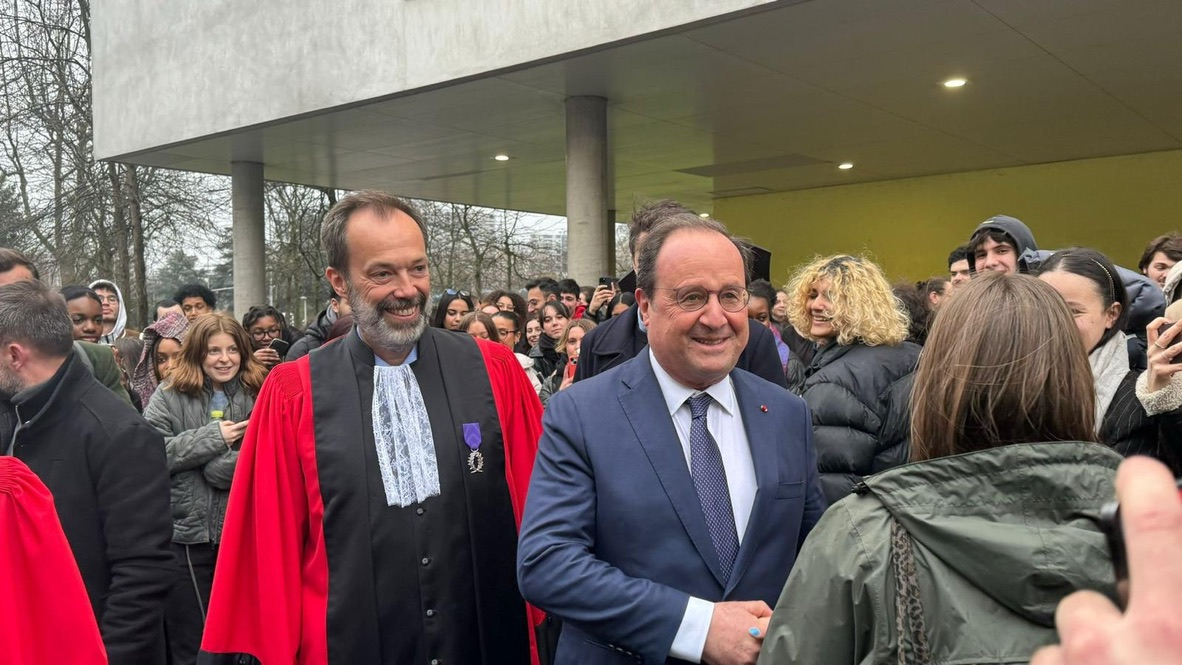
President François Hollande during a visit of the law school in 2024.

The Faculty of Law trains its 3,700 students in the legal profession with 27 full professors, 32 assistant professors and 180 lecturers, supported by a library of over 33,000 books. Each year, the faculty admits 800 new students, for 8,000 Parcoursup applications.

The curriculum is organized around a bachelor's degree in law, with four courses of excellence (such as the Jean Monnet program) and 23 master's degrees.

Université Paris XII's Faculty of Law also has an Institute of Judicial Studies, which prepares students for competitive examinations and exams such as the CRFPA to become lawyers, as well as an Institute of Preparation for General Administration (INSP, ex ENA).
