= Paris-East Créteil University =

University in Île-de-France, France

- Université Paris-Est Créteil
- Former names: Université Paris XII Val de Marne
- Motto: "Connaissance - Action"
- Type: Public university
- Established: 1970
- Affiliations: Paris Est University
- President: Jean-Luc Dubois-Randé
- Academic staff: 1,199
- Students: 32,156
- Undergraduates: 18,123
- Postgraduates: 12,561
- Location: Créteil, Île-de-France, France; 48°47′17″N 2°26′39″E
- Campus: Multiple campuses
- Website: http://www.u-pec.fr/

Paris-East Créteil University (French: Université Paris-Est Créteil, commonly known as Paris XII or UPEC) is a public university located in Créteil, Île-de-France, France. It was inaugurated in 1970. The institution provides instruction in the social sciences, educational sciences, economics and development, administration and exchange, law, arts and humanities, and science and technology.

The university is composed of seventeen institutes situated in Créteil (Val-de-Marne), Seine-Saint-Denis, Seine-et-Marne, and in the 14th arrondissement of Paris.

== History ==
Following the division of the second oldest academic institution, the University of Paris, into thirteen autonomous universities, Val de Marne University was created on March 21, 1970 with the mutualization of the Paris-Est Faculty of Law, created in 1967, and the Faculty of Medicine of Créteil.

The CHU Henri-Mondor facility for the medical school was the first to be built in 1969, shortly before the law and business schools hosted in La Varenne-Saint-Hilaire. In 1970 the university expanded through the construction of the Créteil centre. Further major expansions occurred in 1988, when the Technological centre was created in Sénart and Fontainebleau, and 2005, when the law school was relocated from Saint-Maur to Créteil. The last institute of International politics studies was created in 2021 in Fontainebleau.

== Academics ==
=== UFR (Units of formation and research) ===
List of deans ^{(updated in August 2024)}
UFR	Dean	Campus
Law	Prof. Laurent Gamet (2021- )	André Boulle
Literature	Mrs. Lucie Gournay (2022- )	Créteil-Centre (i)
Medicine	Prof. Pierre Wolkenstein (2018- )	Henri Mondor
Business, management	Mr. François Legendre (2023- )	Mèches
Educational sciences	Prof. Cédric Frétigné (2023- )	Magellan
Sciences and technology	Mr. Yann Bassaglia (2023- )	Créteil-Centre (p)
Administration (AEI)	Mr. Philippe Frouté (2021- )	Créteil-Centre (t)

=== Institutes ===
- Institute of International Administration and Exchange (AEI School)
- Institute of Health and Digital Engineers (EPISEN)
- Institute of Healthcare Training and Research (ESM)
- Institute of Urbanism (Ecole d'urbanisme de Paris)
- Institute of Technology in Créteil-Vitry (IUT of Créteil-Vitry)
- Institute of Technology in Sénart-Fontainebleau (IUT Sénart-Fontainebleau)
- Institute of International politics studies
- Eiffel School of Management (IAE Paris-Est)
- Institute of Ergotherapy
- Institute of Humanities
- Institute of Universe sciences (OSU-EFLUVE)
- Institute of Medical
- Institute of Educational Studies (INSPE Créteil)
- Institute of Economic Science and Business Administration
- Institute of Sciences and Technology
- Institute of Educational and Physical sciences (ESS-STAPS)

== See also ==
- List of public universities in France by academy
