= Pont de l'Alma station =

Railway station in Paris, France

Pont de l'Alma Musée du Quai Branly – Jacques Chirac
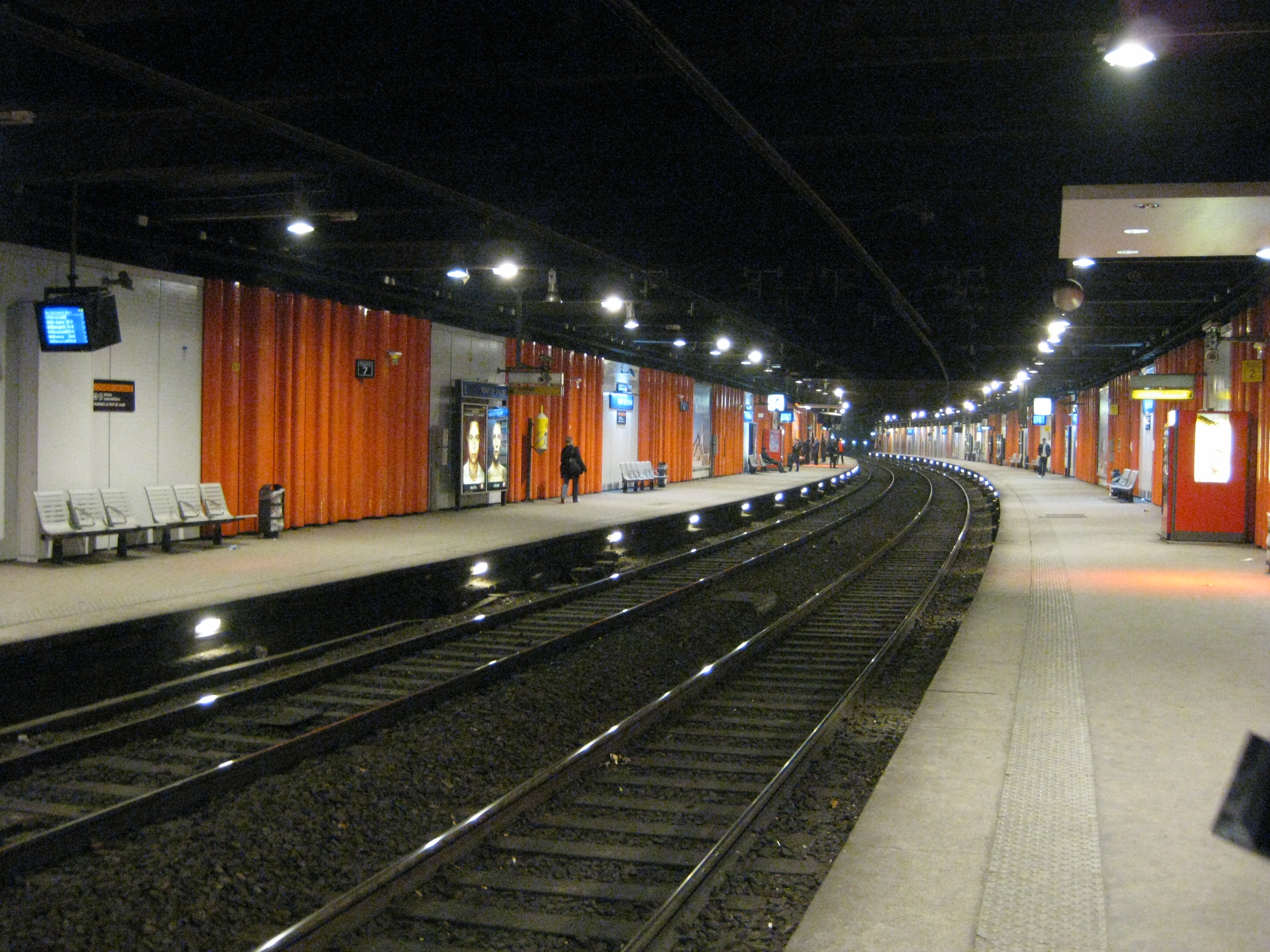
- Pont de l'Alma station platforms

General information
- Location: Place de la Résistance; Paris; France
- Coordinates: 48°51′45″N 2°18′4″E
- Elevation: 28.5 m (94 ft)
- Operator: SNCF
- Platforms: 2 side platforms
- Tracks: 2
- Connections: at Alma–Marceau; RATP Bus: 42 63 72 80 92

Construction
- Structure type: Underground
- Accessible: No

Other information
- Station code: 87393041
- Fare zone: 1

History
- Opened: 12 April 1900
- Rebuilt: 2019

Passengers
- 2024: 4,003,550

Services
Preceding station	RER	Following station
Champ de Mars–Tour Eiffel towards Pontoise, Versailles Château Rive Gauche or Saint-Quentin-en-Yvelines	RER C	Invalides towards Massy-Palaiseau, Dourdan-la-Forêt or Saint-Martin-d'Étampes
Location

Pont de l'Alma (French pronunciation: [pɔ̃ d(ə) lalma]) is a railway station on the RER C line of the Paris Region's express suburban rail system, the Réseau Express Régional (RER). The station is in the 7th arrondissement of Paris. It is named for the nearby Pont de l'Alma and Musée du Quai Branly – Jacques Chirac. Alma–Marceau on Line 9 of the Paris Métro is on the other side of the Pont de l'Alma.

== History ==
The station first opened in 1900 on the Invalides–Versailles-Rive-Gauche railway. It was closed on 25 July 2017 for renovation. Its reopening was delayed until August 2017, then to the end of 2017, the end of 2018, and then to 25 August 2019. It finally reopened on 15 September 2019.

== Nearby ==
Nearby are the Musée du Quai Branly – Jacques Chirac, the seat of the Organisation internationale de la Francophonie on Avenue Bosquet, as well as the American Church in Paris (also served by Invalides station).

== See also ==
- List of stations of the RER
