= Passy station =

Métro station in Paris, France

Passy
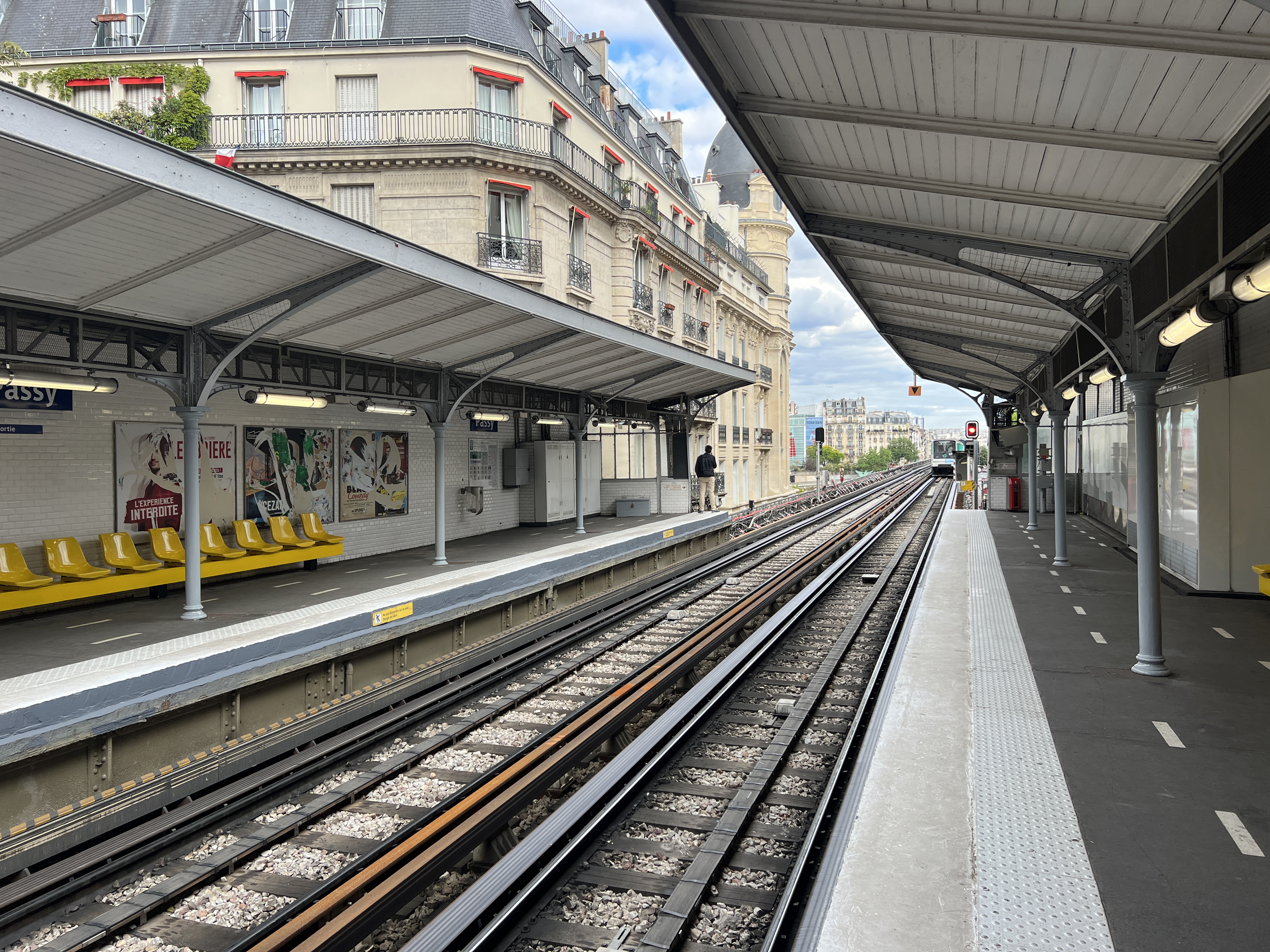
- Passy station in 2022

General information
- Location: 16th arrondissement of Paris; Île-de-France; France
- Coordinates: 48°51′27″N 2°17′09″E
- System: Paris Métro station
- Owner: RATP
- Operator: RATP
- Line: Paris Metro Paris Metro Line 6
- Platforms: 2 (side platforms)
- Tracks: 2

Construction
- Accessible: no

Other information
- Fare zone: 1

History
- Opened: 6 November 1903

Services
Preceding station	Paris Metro	Following station
Trocadéro towards Charles de Gaulle–Étoile	Line 6	Bir-Hakeim towards Nation
Location
- Location within Paris

Passy (French: [pasi]) is an above-ground station on Line 6 of the Paris Métro in the 16th arrondissement. It is just northwest of the Pont de Bir-Hakeim.

== Situation ==
The station and its approaches have notable views, as it is built on a viaduct that abuts the slope of the 25 metre high Chaillot hill just below its crest. Eastbound trains exit the station onto the Pont de Bir-Hakeim bridge over the Seine. Westbound trains enter a tunnel under the hill. Rue Marietta-Alboni runs under the viaduct from the Seine to the foot of the slope, where it becomes two parallel sets of pedestrian stairways to the hilltop, whence the street resumes. The station is entered from the stairways. An upward-moving escalator parallels the northern stairway.

The metro and the stairways bisect the Square Alboni, a chic residential subdivision on the hillside whose properties were assembled and developed between 1894 and 1930. Named, like the street, after a famous opera contralto of the day, the Square has several buildings designed by Louis Dauvergne, with the others intended to harmonize. The buildings around the Square and the (private) park in its center, are not much visible from the platform, but can be seen from the stairways and the streets. Dauvergne also designed Les Grands Hôtels du Trocadéro, the now-iconic turreted buildings on both sides of Rue Marietta-Alboni above and below the hillside. They were built as hotels for visitors to the 1900 International Exposition and afterwards rented as apartments.

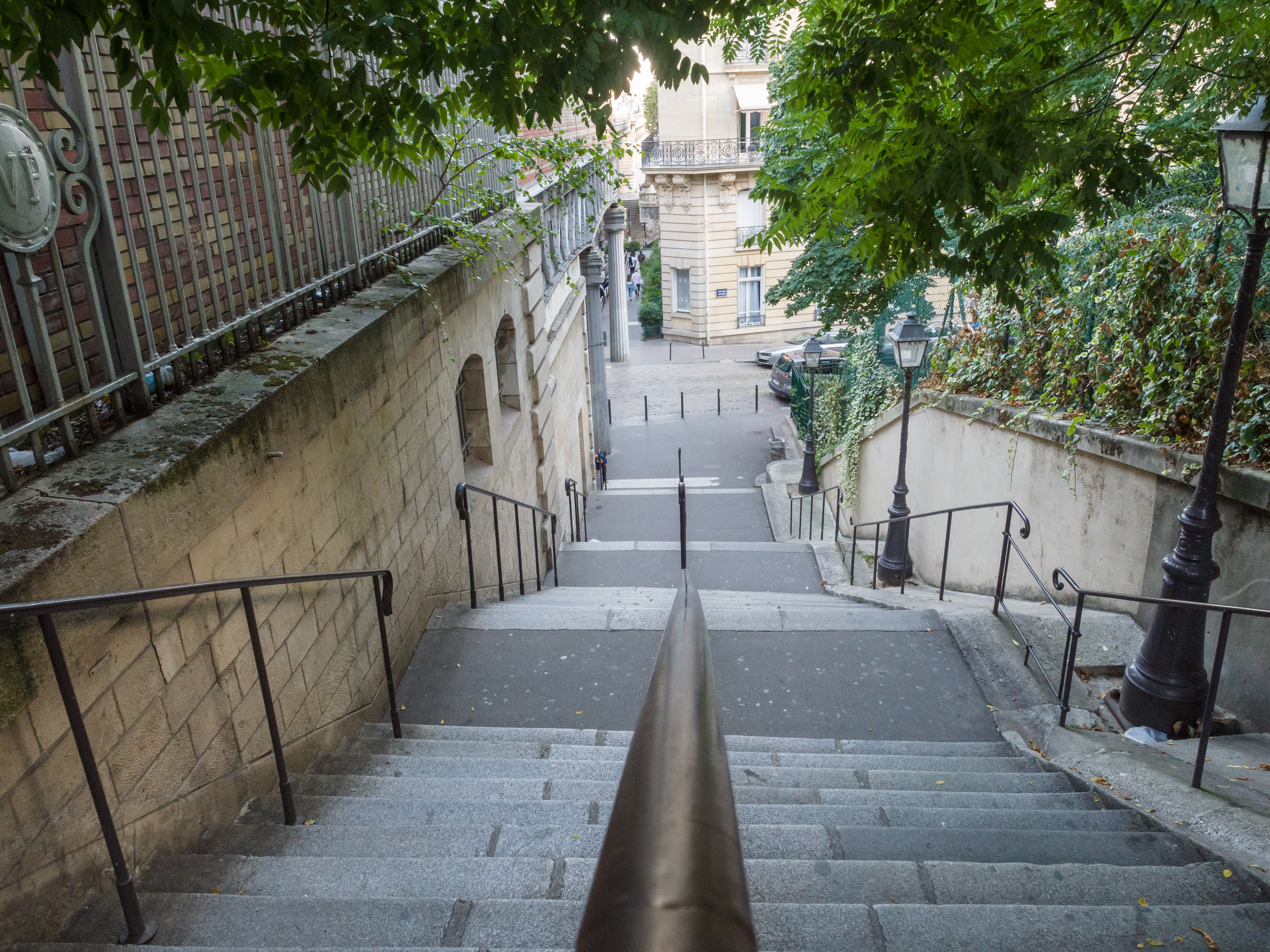
Rue Marietta-Alboni stairway heading downhill from the station.

Rue Marietta-Alboni has a width of only 15 metres (including sidewalks), as compared to the 40-metre width of the Boulevards Extérieurs over which the other elevated sections of Lines 2 and 6 were built. The land for the street was given to the city by the subdivision developers in 1893.

== History ==
The station opened on 6 November 1903, when the branch of Line 1 from Étoile to Trocadéro that had serviced the 1900 Exposition was extended southward to this new, temporary terminus and renamed Line 2 Sud. On 24 April 1906, Line 2 Sud was extended across the Seine and the southern districts of Paris to Place d'Italie. In 1907, the line from Étoile to Place d'Italie was incorporated into Line 5; in 1942 it was incorporated into Line 6.

The station was named after the nearby Quai de Passy, a riverside stretch of the road from Paris to Versailles that during the ancien régime ran near the village of Passy, located on the hilltop above the station. The Quai de Passy was renamed Avenue du Président Kennedy in 1964, but it was not necessary that the station name follow suit: the Rue de Passy is just to its north.

Colonel Passy, the pseudonym of André Dewavrin, the head of Free France’s intelligence group (BCRA) during World War II, derived from the station. He and two of his colleagues selected their noms de guerre from a metro map, and the BCRA's leadership came to be known as the "Line 6 Sentinels." In 1944, the Special Operations Executive agent F. F. E. Yeo-Thomas (known as the "White Rabbit") was arrested by the Gestapo at the station.

== Passenger services ==
=== Access ===
The station has two accesses from Rue Marietta-Alboni, on either side of the station, each divided into two adjoining entrances:

- access 1 - Place du Costa Rica, Maison de Balzac - Musée Georges Clemenceau, equipped with an ascending escalator complemented by fixed stairs to the road, located on the north-east side of the station to the right of Square Alboni;
- access 2 - Avenue du Président Kennedy, Maison de la Radio - Musée du Vin located on the south-west side, near the Consulate General of Algeria.

A corridor passing under the station connects these two accesses to each other.

=== Station layout ===
Platform level	Side platform, doors will open on the right
Platform level	toward Charles de Gaulle–Étoile	← toward Charles de Gaulle–Étoile (Trocadéro)
Platform level	toward Nation	toward Nation (Bir-Hakeim) →
Platform level	Side platform, doors will open on the right

1F	Mezzanine for platform connection

Street Level

=== Platforms ===
Passy is a station of standard configuration. It has two platforms separated by the metro tracks. It has the particularity of being underground at its western end and elevated at the other end, because of the slope of the terrain. The ceiling of the first consists of a metal deck whose beams, silver in colour, are supported by vertical walls, while the rest of the platforms is sheltered by awnings supported by grey pillars. The bevelled white ceramic tiles cover the walls (the elevated part is also covered with bricks drawing geometric patterns on the outside) and the north-west tunnel exit, the opposite tunnel exit being glazed. The advertising frames are made of white ceramic and the name of the station is inscribed in Parisine font on enamelled plaques, projecting on the elevated side. The seats are yellow Motte style and lighting is provided by independent tubes. Access is mid-platform.

=== Bus connections ===
The station is served by lines 32 and 72 of the RATP Bus Network.

== Nearby ==
The area is a quiet, well-heeled residential neighborhood, not heavily touristed.

The Pont de Bir-Hakeim (formerly the Pont de Passy) is a road, pedestrian, and metro bridge across the Seine completed in 1906 primarily to carry the metro. In 1986 it was classified an historical monument. Opposite is the Grenelle district in the 15th arrondissement. The Île aux Cygnes midway in the Seine can be accessed by foot from the bridge.

The Parc de Passy, a public park opened in 2004 on the site of a cleared neighborhood, is 200 metres to the southwest.

The Maison de Balzac, a museum honoring the writer in a house he lived in during the 1840s, is 500 metres to the southwest.

The Maison de la Radio et de la Musique (formerly Maison de Radio France) is about 750 metres to the southwest.

The Musée Clemenceau, the apartment and garden of the French statesman, is 200 metres to the north.

The Palais de Chaillot and the Jardins du Trocadéro, opposite the Seine from the Eiffel Tower, are about 550 metres to the northeast.

Among the nearby buildings are the Majestic Passy cinema, and the Lycée Saint-Louis-de-Gonzague high school.

== Gallery ==
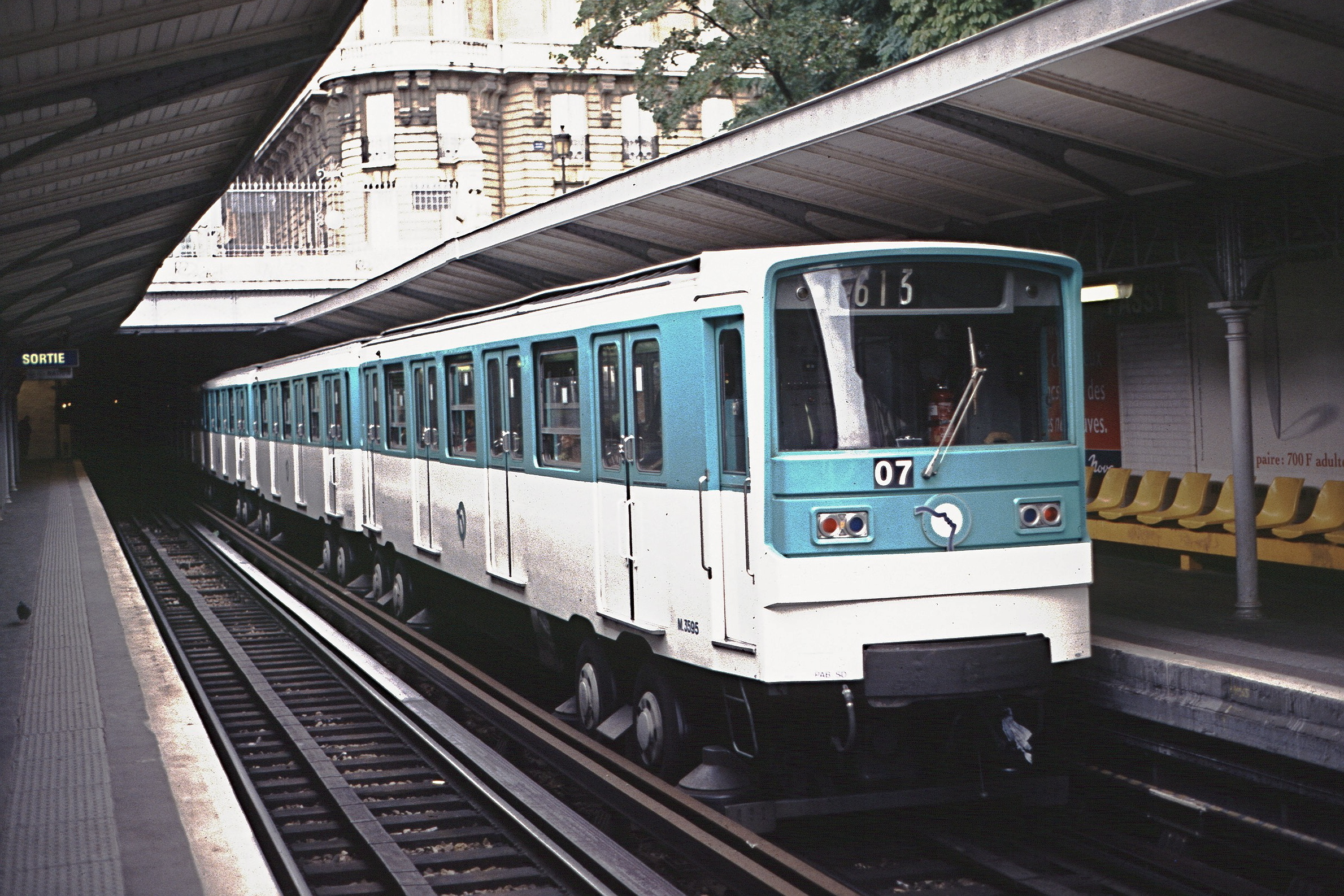
MP 73 rolling stock with green faces prior his renovation at Passy in 1994

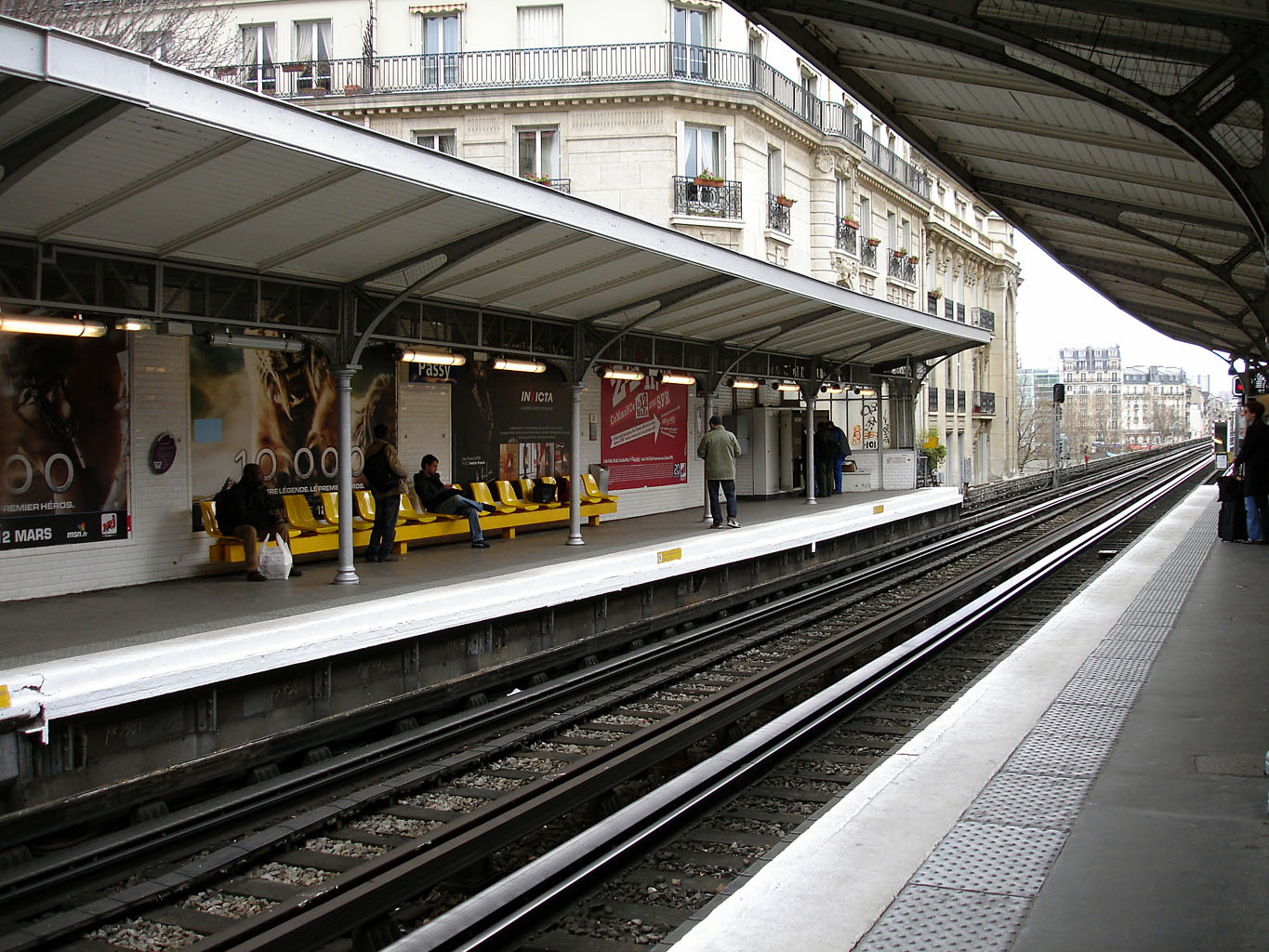
Line 6 platforms at Passy

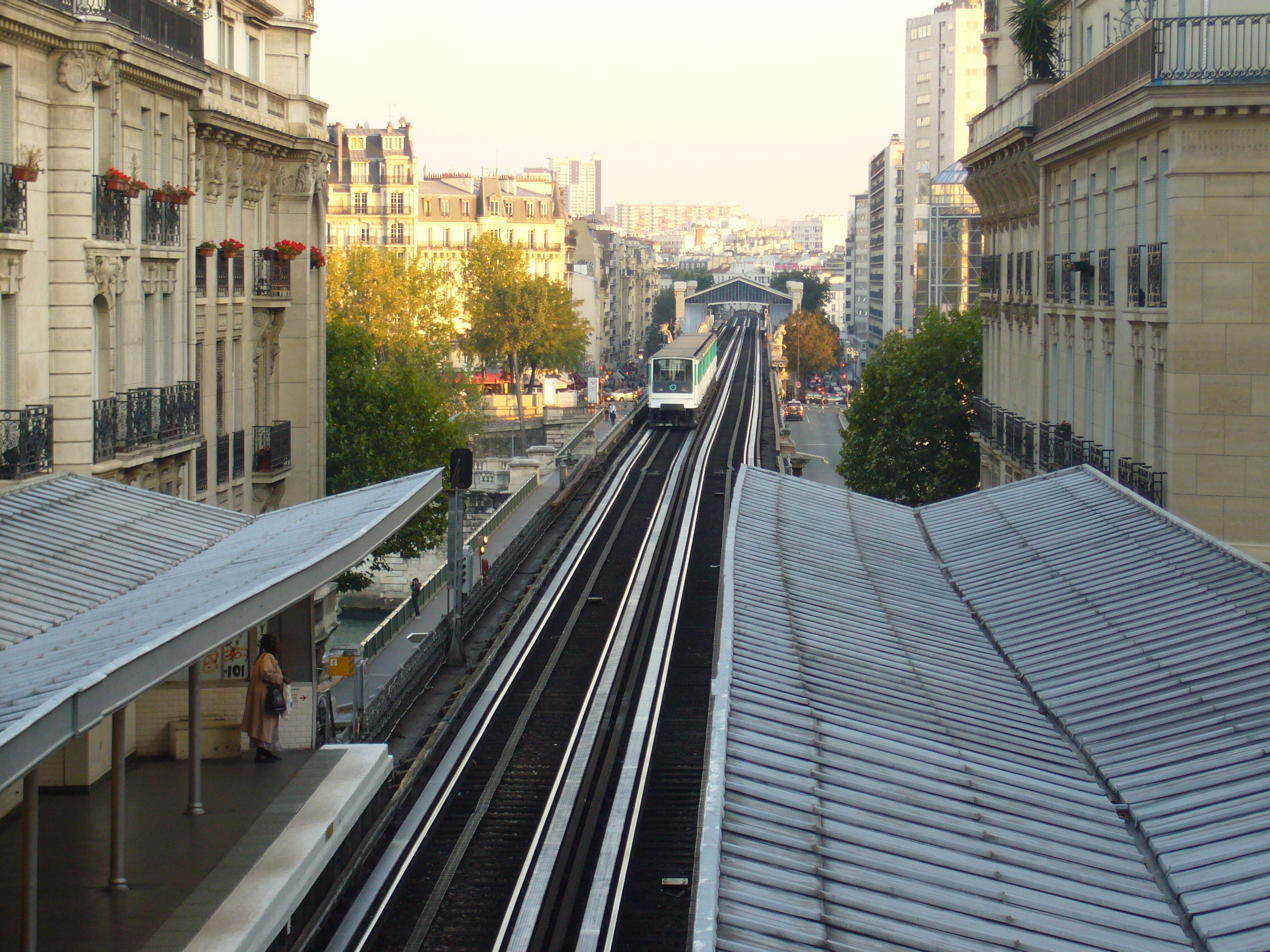
View from Passy towards Passy Viaduct and Bir-Hakeim station.

MP 73 rolling stock on Line 6 at Passy

MP 73 rolling stock on Line 6 at Passy
