= Champ de Mars–Tour Eiffel station =

Railway station in Paris

Champ de Mars Tour Eiffel
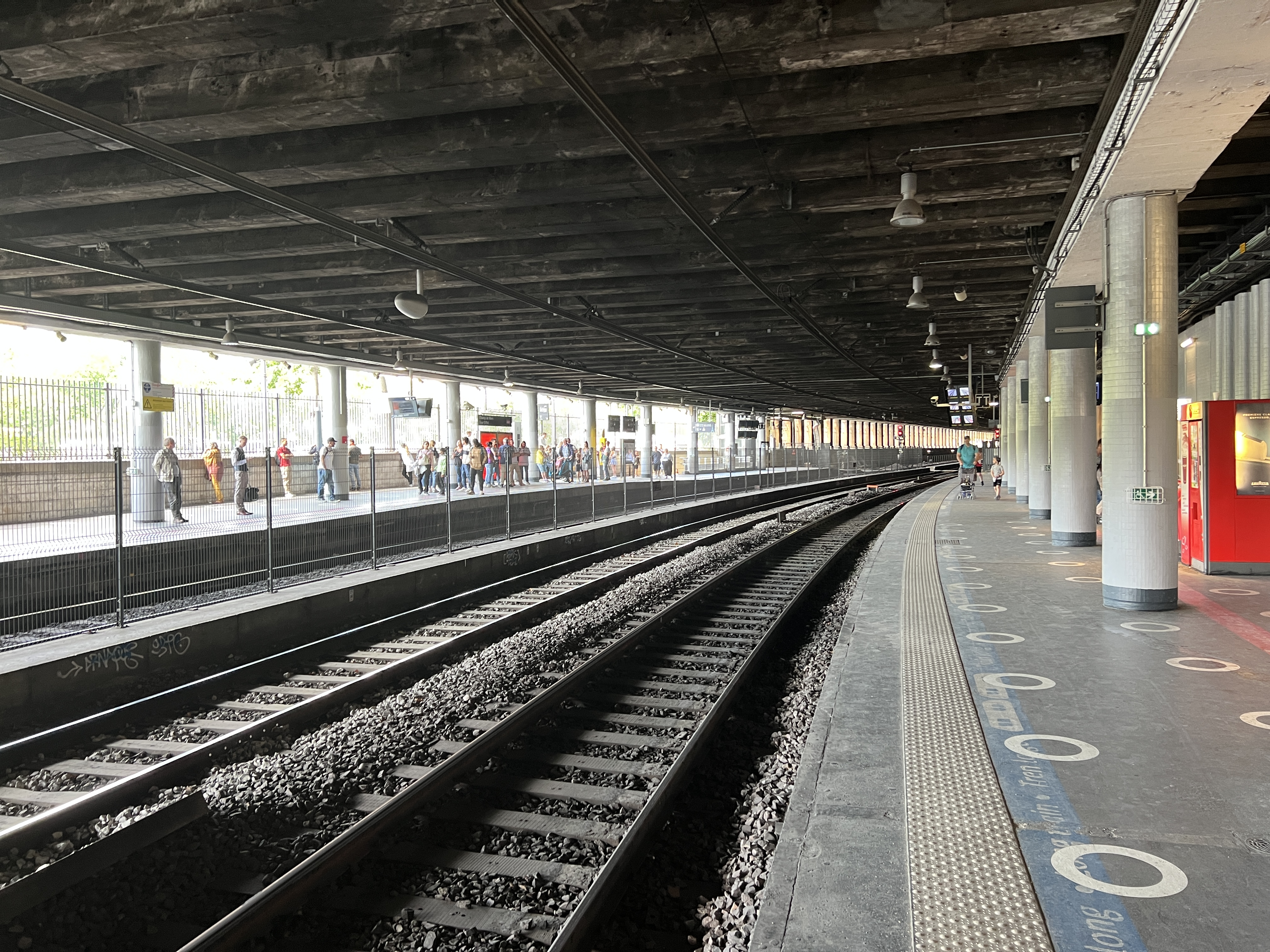
- Champ de Mars–Tour Eiffel station platforms

General information
- Location: Quai Branly; Paris; France
- Coordinates: 48°51′14″N 2°17′20″E
- Operator: SNCF
- Platforms: 2 side platforms
- Tracks: 3
- Connections: at Bir-Hakeim; RATP Bus: 30 42 69 82 86

Construction
- Structure type: Underground
- Accessible: No

Other information
- Station code: 87393058
- Fare zone: 1

History
- Opened: 1867

Passengers
- 2024: 7,703,531

Services
Preceding station	RER	Following station
Avenue du Président Kennedy towards Pontoise	RER C	Pont de l'Alma towards Massy-Palaiseau, Dourdan-la-Forêt or Saint-Martin-d'Étampes
Javel towards Versailles Château Rive Gauche or Saint-Quentin-en-Yvelines	RER C	Pont de l'Alma towards Massy-Palaiseau, Dourdan-la-Forêt or Saint-Martin-d'Étampes
Location

Champ de Mars–Tour Eiffel (French pronunciation: [ʃɑ̃ də maʁs tuʁ ɛfɛl]) is a railway station on the RER C line of the Paris Region's express suburban rail system, the Réseau Express Régional (RER). It is in the 7th arrondissement of Paris, close to the Champ de Mars and Eiffel Tower, after which it is named.

The site has accommodated a total of five stations. The station was originally built to receive goods necessary for the construction of the pavilions for the Exposition Universelle of 1867, and for subsequent World's Fairs in 1878, 1889, 1900 and 1937. The location was chosen as it was then a large piece of land devoid of buildings, facing the Trocadéro and the École Militaire. It was built on the street corner of Avenue de Suffren and Quai Branly.

== Railway station ==
A junction station, it is located in the west of the 7th arrondissement of Paris, on the left bank of the Seine. Located at an altitude of 30.8m, it is located at Kilometric point (PK) 1,970 of the Ligne des Invalides à Versailles-Rive-Gauche. It is also the origin, at the bifurcation of Boulainvilliers, PK 2,460, the Ligne d'Ermont–Eaubonne à Champ-de-Mars.

== History ==
=== The 1867 station ===
The first station was built for the Exposition Universelle (1867). This station was a terminus and the line ran from the Petite-Ceinture to the Champ de Mars. The station was demolished shortly after the Exposition.

=== The 1878 station ===
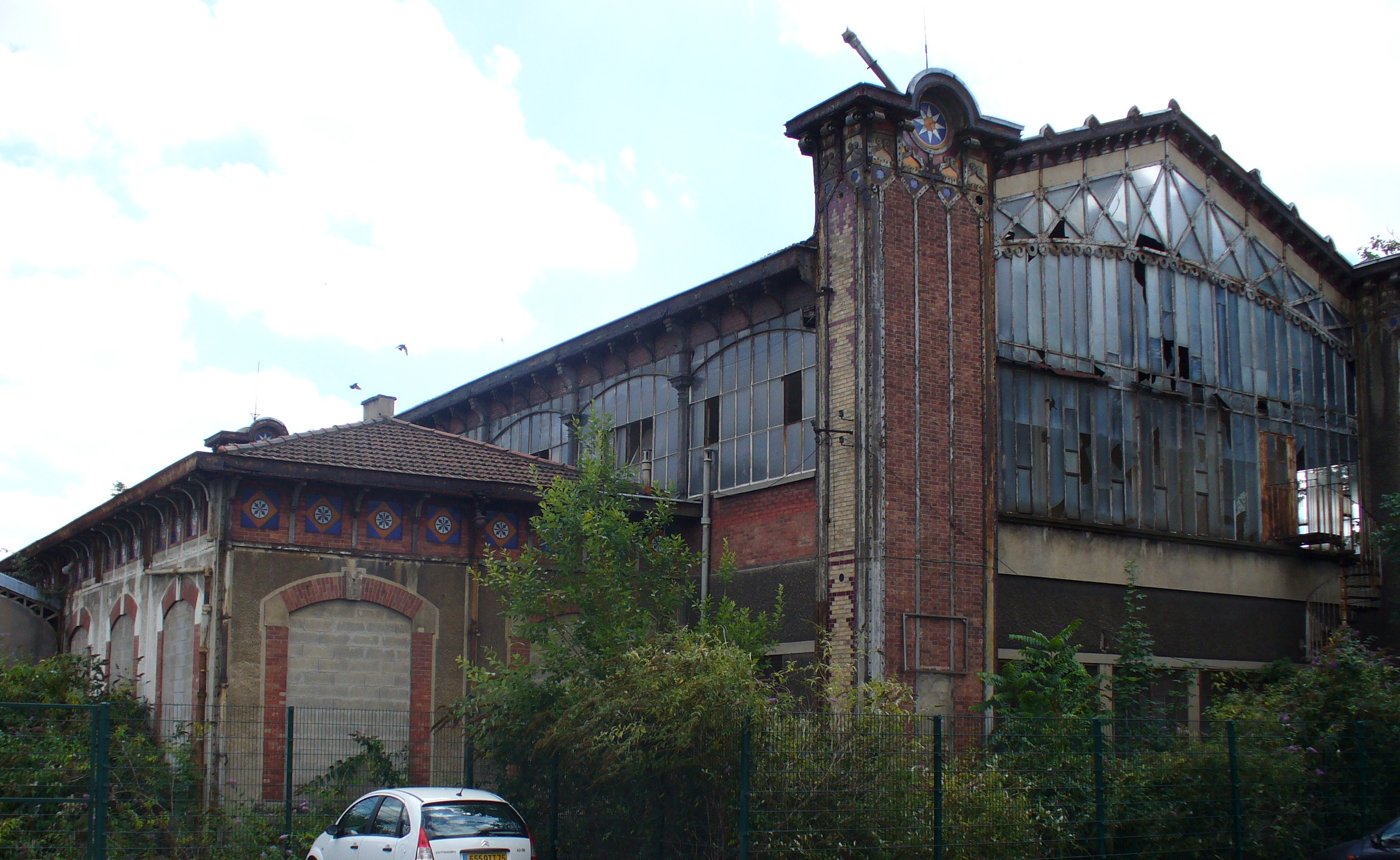
The station built at Asnières-sur-Seine after use at Bois-Colombes.

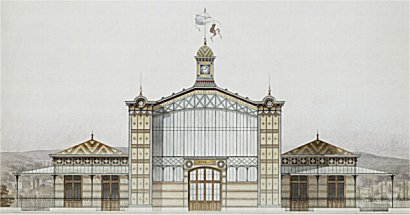
The station's main building by Juste Lisch

A new station was built for the Exposition Universelle (1878). The building was designed and built by Juste Lisch. It had four dead-end tracks as well as four additional parking tracks. This enabled a greater functionality than the previous station.

The station was composed of a central metallic rooftop, filled with red bricks. Two side buildings (called pagodas) encompassed the passenger concourse which were themselves hidden behind canopies which extended onto the platforms. A buffet was built to the south of the station along the Avenue de Suffren.

Champ de Mars remained open after the World's Fair and regained popularity for the 1889 World's Fair. The Eiffel Tower was built next to the station.

In mid 1894, all passenger services ended to permit the demolition of all of the level crossings. A bridge over the river Seine to link the dead-end line to the Ligne d'Auteuil was built soon afterwards which meant that the station building had to be demolished. It was moved in 1897 and used as the station building for Bois-Colombes. The building is now listed.

=== The 1900 station ===
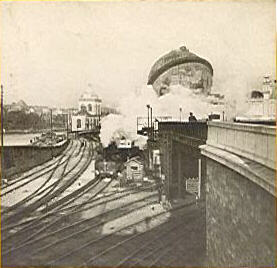
The 1900 station with the Celestial Globe in the background

For the Exposition Universelle (1900) the station was yet again reopened. The line was extended to Les Invalides and moved to the side of the river Seine. The CF de l'Ouest created a new through station which was situated below the Eiffel Tower as well as the newly built Celestial Globe.

As well as a passenger station, the CF de l'Ouest also built a goods station; this was situated between the Avenue de Suffren and the Boulevard de Grenelle. At the end of the World's Fair all services were transferred to Les Invalides.

=== The 1900 goods station ===
Between 1900 and 1937, the goods station was a busy coal terminal. 1910 was the scene of spectacular flooding which gave many photographers the opportunity to take curious photos of the site under water.

In 1937, the goods yard was transferred to Vaugirard and the site became an EMU shed. The depot closed in 1971.

=== The 1988 station ===
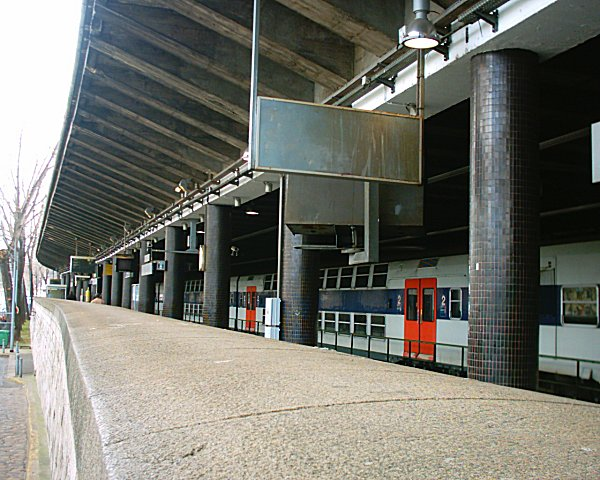
The station in February 2006

In 1988, the RER C, a new suburban railway line opened. Champ de Mars became a stop on the line serving the Eiffel Tower and the connection stop for trains from Pontoise and Versailles.

The station is currently covered, situated below the Quai Branly but many features from the original station remain such as the platform walls.

The current station has two side platforms serving 2 out of 3 tracks.

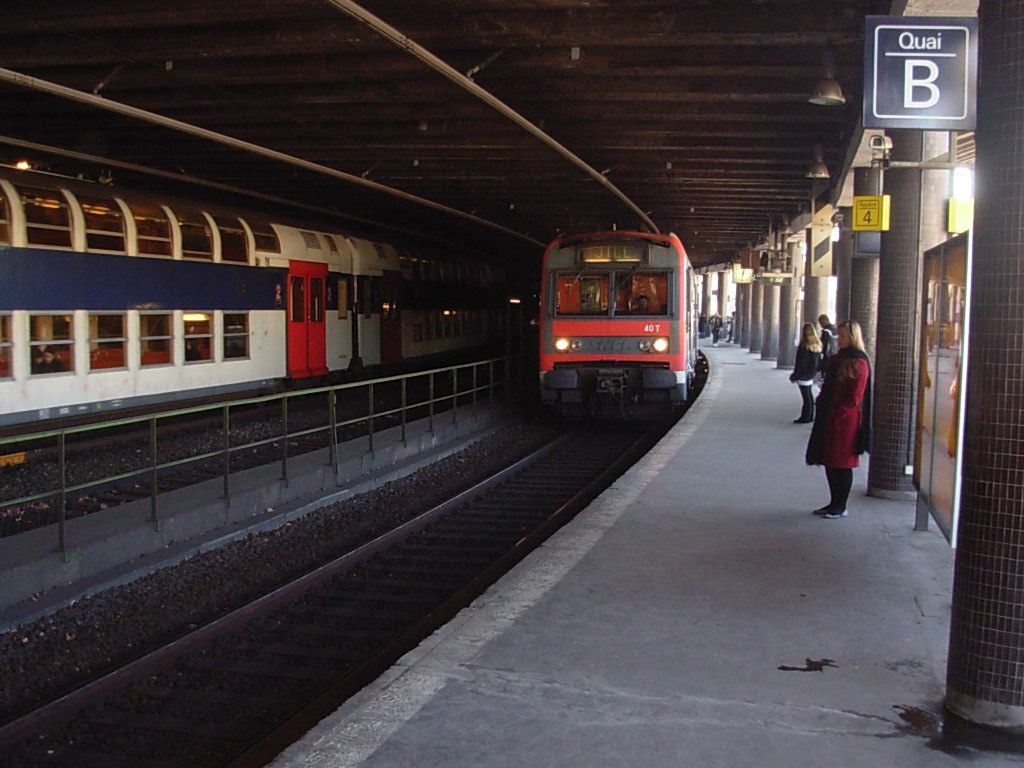
Eastbound JILL train arriving

== Nearby ==
Bir-Hakeim, on Line 6 of the Paris Métro, is within walking distance and indicated as a connection on the Paris Métro map. Nearby as well is the Embassy of Australia, Paris complex which also houses the Australian ambassador's residence.

== See also ==
- List of Réseau Express Régional stations
