= Láchar =

- Municipality
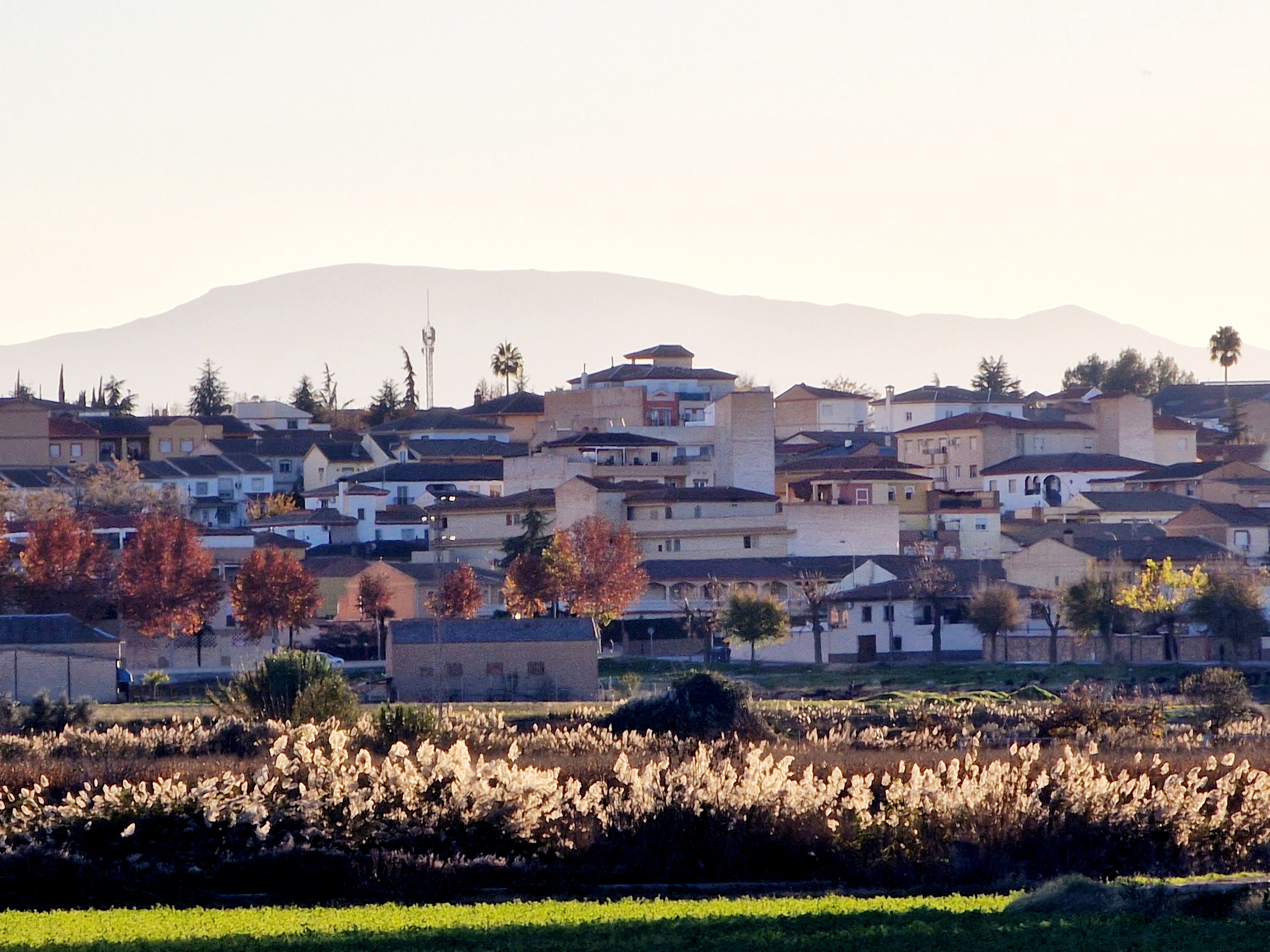

- Flag Coat of arms

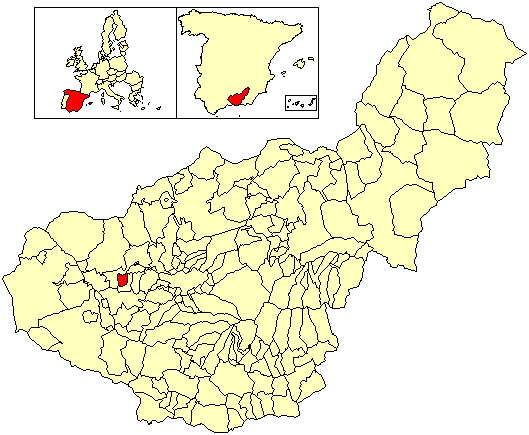
- Location of Láchar

- Location in Spain
- Coordinates: 37°12′N 3°50′W
- Country: Spain
- Autonomous community: Andalusia
- Province: Granada
- Comarca: Vega de Granada
- Judicial district: Santa Fe

Government
  - Mayor: Elisabet Barnés Rodríguez (2024) (IU)

Area
  - Total: 13.12 km^{2} (5.07 sq mi)
- Elevation: 568 m (1,864 ft)

Population (2025-01-01)
  - Total: 3,892
  - Density: 296.6/km^{2} (768.3/sq mi)
- Demonym(s): lachareño, -ña
- Time zone: UTC+1 (CET)
  - Summer (DST): UTC+2 (CEST)
- Postal code: 18327 (Láchar); 18328 (Peñuelas)
- Website: Official website

Láchar is a municipality in the province of Granada, in Spain. The village of Láchar lies in Granada's floodplain (or "Vega de Granada", in Spanish) amid poplar forests, arable farmland and olive groves. The surrounding countryside, and particularly the pine forest known as Los Pinares, lends itself to outdoor sports and recreational activities, and there is also a long tradition of partridge shooting.

== History ==
The origin of Láchar goes back to the times of the earliest human settlements and its situation in the fertile floodplain of the River Genil has made farming the main form of livelihood in the area for many centuries.

Studies have revealed the existence of a Roman settlement in the area, "Los Hornillos", and a field of silos has been found which would have been for the storage of food. Near to "Lacen" (the name given to Láchar by the Romans), there are also other Roman remains, such as the "Villas Rusticae" in Adamucejo (or Lower Daimuz), and Daragoleja, which was under the administrative control of the Roman villa of Ilurco.

In the Reconquest, the alquería or farmstead was burnt by the troops commanded by Álvaro de Luna (the Constable of Castile) and was finally conquered in 1492.

Láchar had previously formed part of the Alquería of La Piedra (the Spanish translation of its Arabic name) which was owned by a wealthy Nasrid family from Boabdil's court. Cortijo of Láchar were granted to the ancestors of the Count of Benalúa, who owned it until 1897 when Don Julio Quesada de Cañaveral y Piédrola successfully made a claim of ownership resulting in the cortijo and all its adjoining land being passed to him. At the end of the Spanish Civil War, the village was bought by the National Institute for Colonisation, to carry out the plans outlined in 1932 by the Institute for Agrarian Reform for the redistribution of land among new settlers.

== Twin town ==
- Brenna, Italy

== See also ==
- List of municipalities in Granada
