= IAE Paris-Est School of Management =

Business school in Paris

Coordinates: 48°47′16″N 2°27′00″E

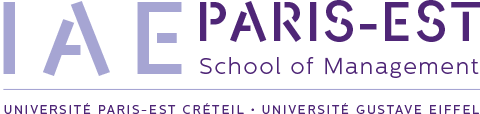
- Former names: IAE Gustave Eiffel, School of Management
- Motto: Dynamisme, Rigueur, Diversité
- Motto in English: Dynamism, Rigor, Diversity
- Type: Public
- Established: 2007
- Affiliation: IAE France
- Academic affiliations: University of Paris Est-Créteil; University of Paris-Est Marne-la-Vallée
- Dean: Christophe Torset
- Academic staff: 470
- Students: 1500 (2019)
- Location: Créteil, Paris, France
- Campus: Sénart, Descartes, Créteil
- Language: French, English
- Website: www.iae-paris-est.fr/en

The IAE Paris-Est School of Management (formerly known as IAE Gustave Eiffel, School of Management) is a French public graduate school of management. Its research lab IRG is one of the largest in management in France.

It is a part of the University of Paris Est-Créteil (UPEC), University of Paris-Est Marne-la-Vallée (UPEM) and the IAE France Network.

The IAE Paris-Est School offers both undergraduate (Bachelor – Licence) and graduate (Master and PhD – Master et Doctorat) programs in fields such as accounting, finance, management, marketing, and health management. Some of its Masters are ranked among the best in France.

== History ==
IAE Paris-Est School of Management was created in 2007, although the management courses have been taught at the University Paris-Est Créteil Val-de-Marne since the mid-1970s and the Master of Management Sciences (MSG) was founded in about 1980.

On 14 February 2012, IAE Paris-Est - University Paris-Est Créteil (UPEC) merged with the 11 masters 'management' of the University Paris-Est Marne-la-Vallée (UPEMLV), including two units of training and research.

== Campuses ==
IAE Paris-Est School of Management operates across three campuses:

- UPEC campus The UPEC campus is located in Créteil,. The university sports association offers students more than 30 sports activities, while the cultural association organises various cultural activities in Paris and the nearby region.
- UPEM campus The IAE is located in the Bois de l'Etang building, offering courses to students in groups of 25 to 30, with many course materials being accessible through an e-learning platform.
- The Sénart campus The Sénart site of the IAE Paris-Est comprises five departments of the IUT (Marketing Techniques, Business Management and Administration, Social Careers, Electrical Engineering and Industrial IT and Industrial Engineering and Maintenance).

== Programs ==
29 Master's degrees have been created in accordance with labor market needs, three of which are specific to the school: the Master in Corporate Social Responsibility, the Master in Geomarketing, and the Master in Higher Education Management. Furthermore, IAE Paris-Est School of Management provides a range of different programs: full-time, part-time, and continuing education programs.

== Research ==
The IRG (Institut de Recherche en Gestion), the Management Sciences Research Center from the University Paris-Est, has been labeled "Equipe d’accueil" by the CNRS (French National Center for Scientific Research) since 1997.

IRG staff counts about 60 French and International PhD students and 70 Researchers organized around three areas: Finance & Accounting, Management, and Marketing & Logistics. Its aim is to encourage the development of research in Management at the University Paris-Est and to contribute to the scientific and technical progress in Management Sciences. It is also an organization which enables teaching innovations and provides support for young faculty members, PhD students, and Research Master's Students.

== Student life ==
The Student Union's (BDE - Bureau Des Etudiants) mission is to facilitate social interaction among students by organizing and sponsoring a variety of social events.
