= Étienne (surname) =

The surname Étienne, also spelled Etienne and Ettienne, may refer to:

- Andre Ettienne (born 1990), Trinidadian footballer
- Caleb Etienne (born 2001), American football player
- Charles-Guillaume Étienne (1778–1845), French dramatist and writer
- Clauvis Etienne (born 2003), Senegalese footballer
- Clifford Etienne (born 1972), American former heavyweight boxer
- Damian Etienne (born 1982), also known as Hypasounds, Barbadian soca singer
- Errol Étienne (born 1941), artist in many media, including watercolor
- Gérard Étienne (1936–2008), Haitian and Canadian linguist, journalist and writer
- Jean-Claude Étienne (1941–2017), French politician
- Martine Étienne (born 1956), French politician
- Ophélie-Cyrielle Étienne (born 1990), French swimmer
- Roland Étienne (archaeologist) (born 1944), French archaeologist
- Ronald Etienne (born 1896), Grenadian cricketer
- Thomas Etienne (1930–2025), Dominican politician
- Travis Etienne (born 1999), American football player
- Trevor Etienne (born 2004), American football player
- Tyson Etienne (born 1999), American basketball player

== See also ==
- Estienne
