= Estienne =

Estienne is a French surname or given name. Notable people with the name include:

== Given name ==
- Estienne or Étienne de La Boétie (1530–1563), French philosopher, judge and writer
- Estienne Grossin (fl. 1418–1421), French composer
- Estienne de La Roche (1470–1530), French mathematician
- Estienne Roger (1665 or 1666–1722), French-born printer and publisher working in the Netherlands
- Estienne du Tertre (fl. mid-16th century), French composer

== Surname ==
- Henri Estienne (elder) (died 1521), founder of a French family of scholars and printers
  - Robert Estienne (1503–1559), printer and classical scholar, son of the above
    - Henri Estienne (1528 or 1531–1598), also known as Henricus Stephanus, printer and classical scholar, son of Robert Estienne
  - Charles Estienne (1504–1564), an early exponent of the science of anatomy in France, son of Henri Estienne
    - Nicole Estienne (c. 1542–c. 1588), poet, daughter of Charles Estienne
- Gomar Estienne (died 1555), bookbinder
- Jean Baptiste Eugène Estienne (1860–1936), general of artillery and the creator of the French tank arm
  - Georges Estienne (1896–1969), aviator, explorer of the Sahara and businessman, son of the general

== See also ==
- École Estienne, the traditional name of the Graduate School of Arts and Printing Industry in Paris
- Étienne (disambiguation)
- "Stephens" . Encyclopædia Britannica. Vol. XXII (9th ed.). 1887. pp. 534–536.
