= Quartier de Croulebarbe =

Coordinates: 48.8349609375°N 2.3527138233184814°E

Croulebarbe
- Quartier de Croulebarbe
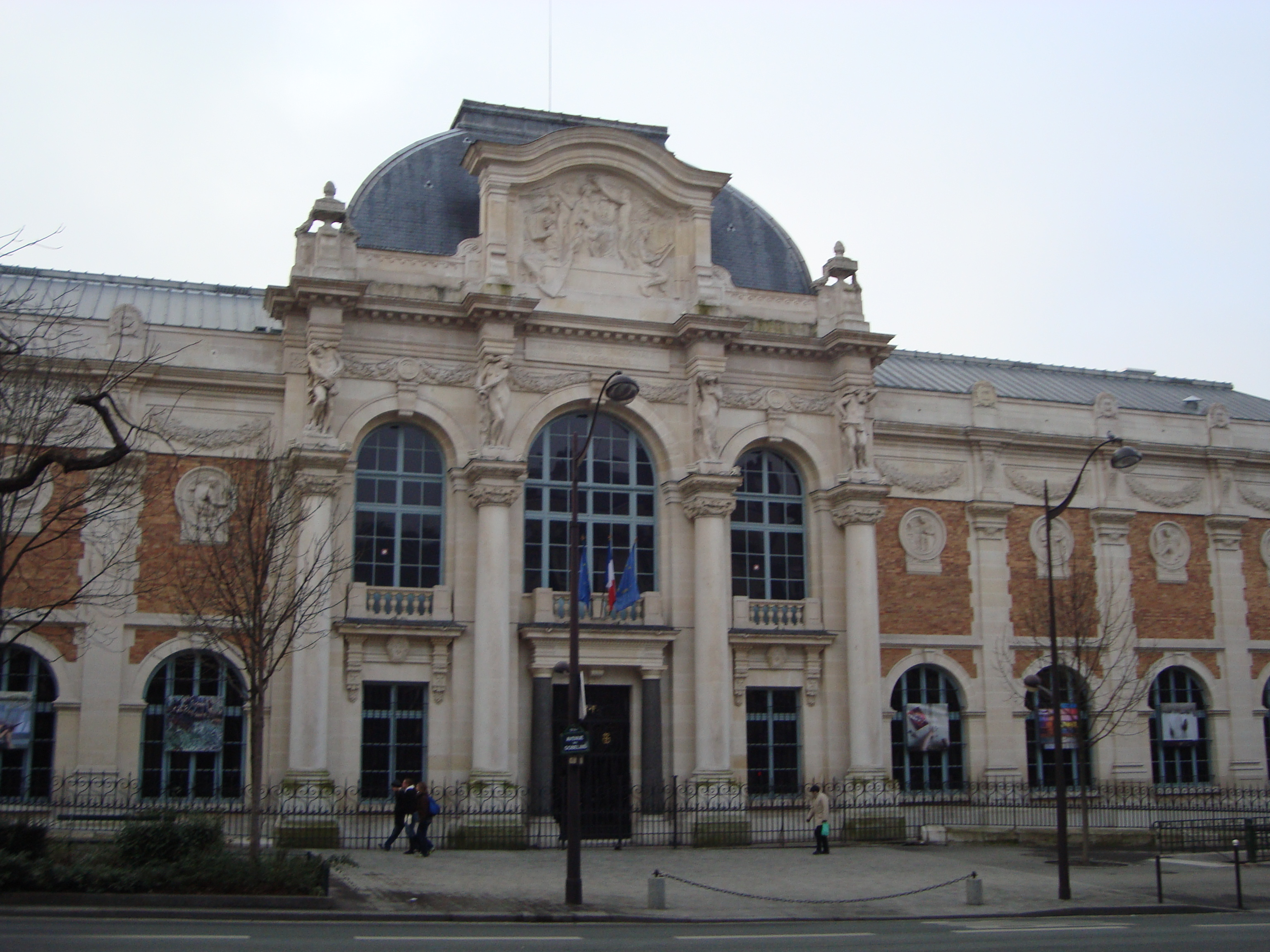
- Gobelins Manufactory
- Interactive map of Croulebarbe
- Country: France
- Region: Île-de-France
- Ville: Paris
- Arrondissement: 13th

Area
  - Total: 0.692 km^{2} (0.267 sq mi)

Population (2016)
  - Total: 20,793
  - Density: 30,048/km^{2} (77,820/sq mi)

The Quartier de Croulebarbe is the 52nd of the 80 quarters of Paris, located in the 13th arrondissement.

The quarters of the 13th arrondissement

== Location ==
The administrative district in the 13th arrondissement of Paris is bordered by the following streets:

- West: Rue de la Santé
- North: Boulevard de Port-Royal
- East: Avenue des Gobelins
- South: Boulevard Auguste-Blanqui

== Origin of the name ==
The neighborhood was named after the “de Croulebarbe” family, who owned vineyards and mills on the site along the Bièvre in the 13th century.

== History ==
The hamlet belonging to the de Croulebarbe family was originally part of the commune of Gentilly; the first Parisian houses were located near the parish of Saint-Hippolyte. This suburb was incorporated into Paris during the reign of Louis XV. The area’s wealth stemmed from both its industrial character—linked to the Bièvre River and encompassing upholsterers, dyers, tanners, brewers, and butchers—and its rural aspects, such as vineyards and meadows, not to mention the limestone quarries to the south.

Over time, however, Paris continued to expand, absorbing many previously independent suburbs. It was the large-scale urban redevelopment of Paris under Baron Haussmann that ultimately gave the neighborhood the appearance it retains today.

== Sightseeing features ==
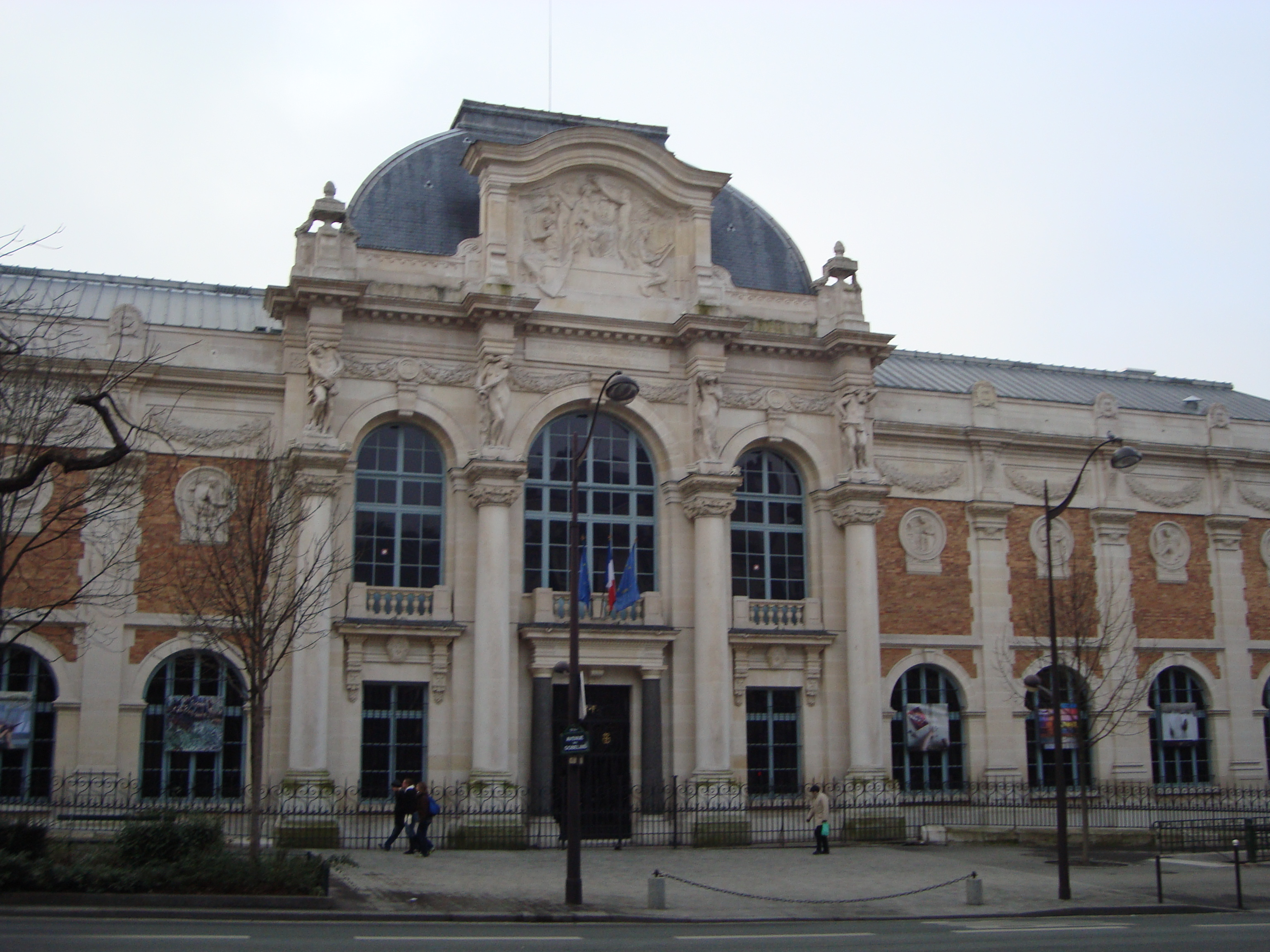
Gobelins Manufactory

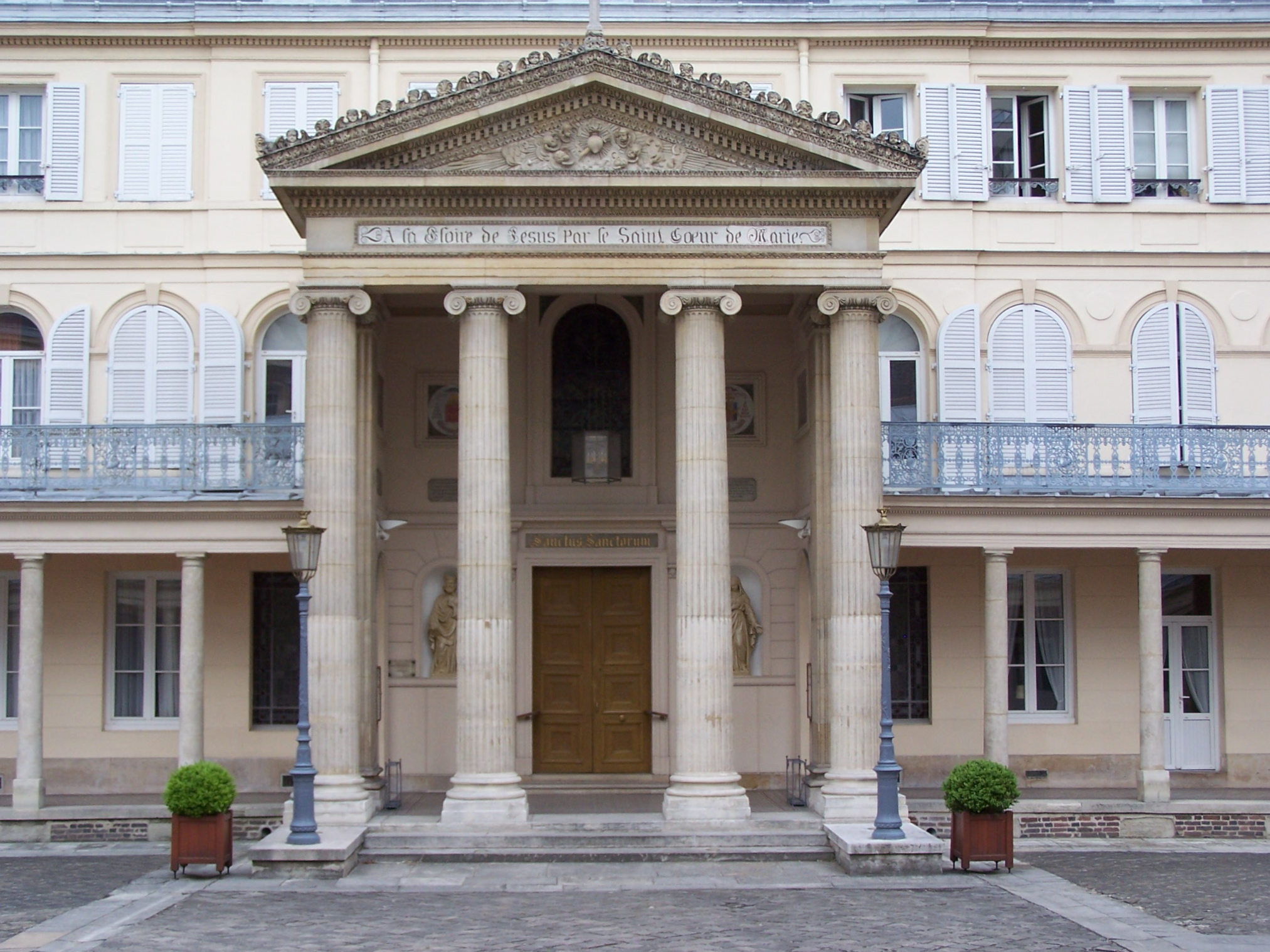
Convent of the Dames Augustines, Rue de la Santé

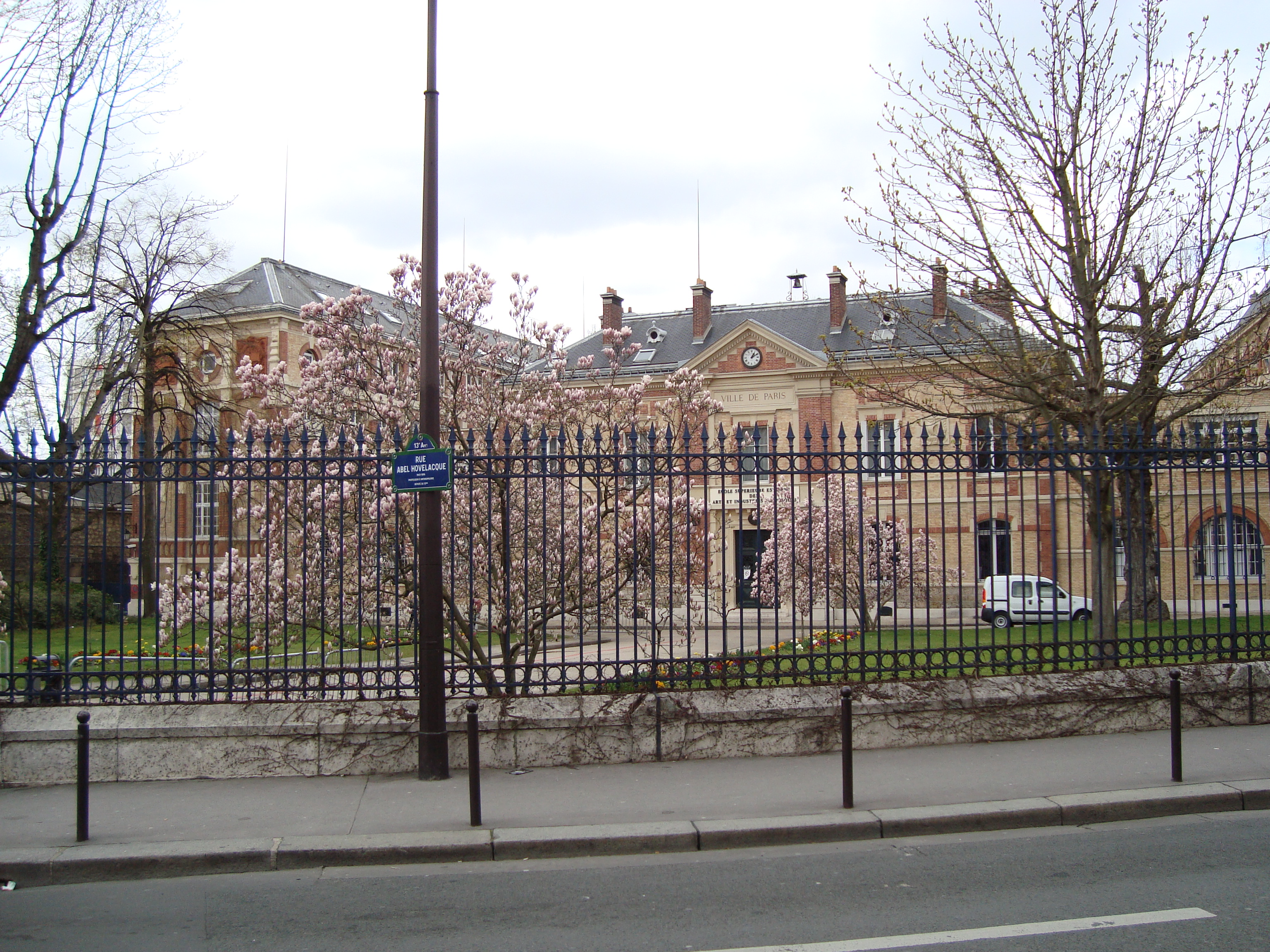
École Estienne

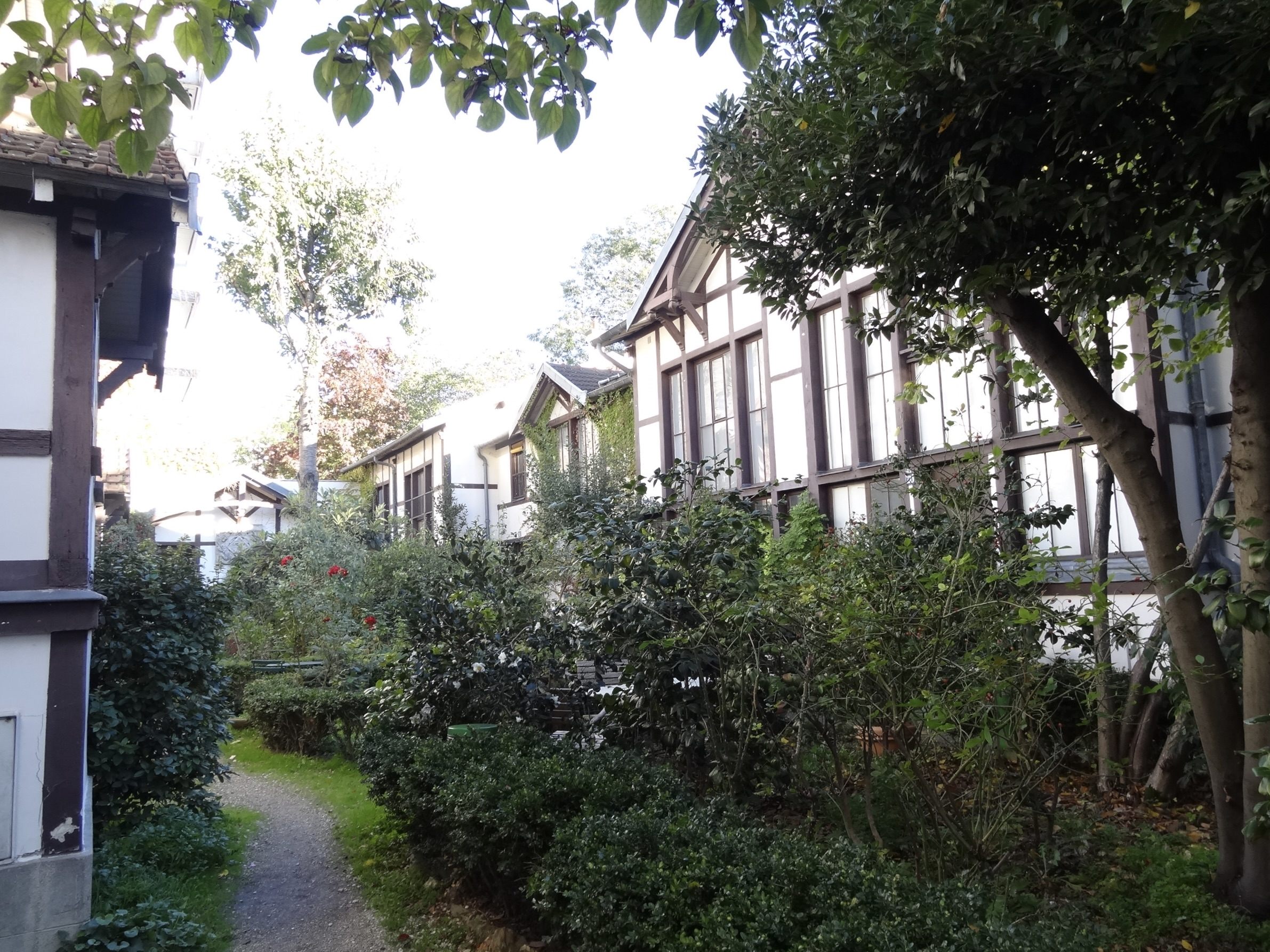
61-62, Boulevard Arago
- Gobelins Manufactory
- Cité fleurie

== Bibliography ==
- Gérard Conte, C'était hier… Le 13^{e}, Éditions L.M. - Le Point, 1992
- René Dubail, D'hier à aujourd'hui. Le XIII^{e} arrondissement, Les Éditions municipales, 1999
- Renaud Gagneux, Jean Anckaert et Gérard Conte, Sur les traces de la Bièvre parisienne, Éditions Parigramme, 2002
- Jacques Hillairet, Dictionnaire historique des rues de Paris, Paris, Les Éditions de Minuit, 1972, 1985, 1991, 1997, (1st Aug. 1960), 1 476 S., 2 Bd., ISBN 2-7073-1054-9, OCLC 466966117.
- Philippe Lucas, Mémoire des Rues. Paris XIIIe arrondissement, Éditions Parimagine, 2004
- Catherine Vialle, Je me souviens du 13e arrondissement, Éditions Parigramme, 1995
