= Sainte-Rosalie, Paris =

Church of Sainte-Rosalie
- Église Sainte-Rosalie
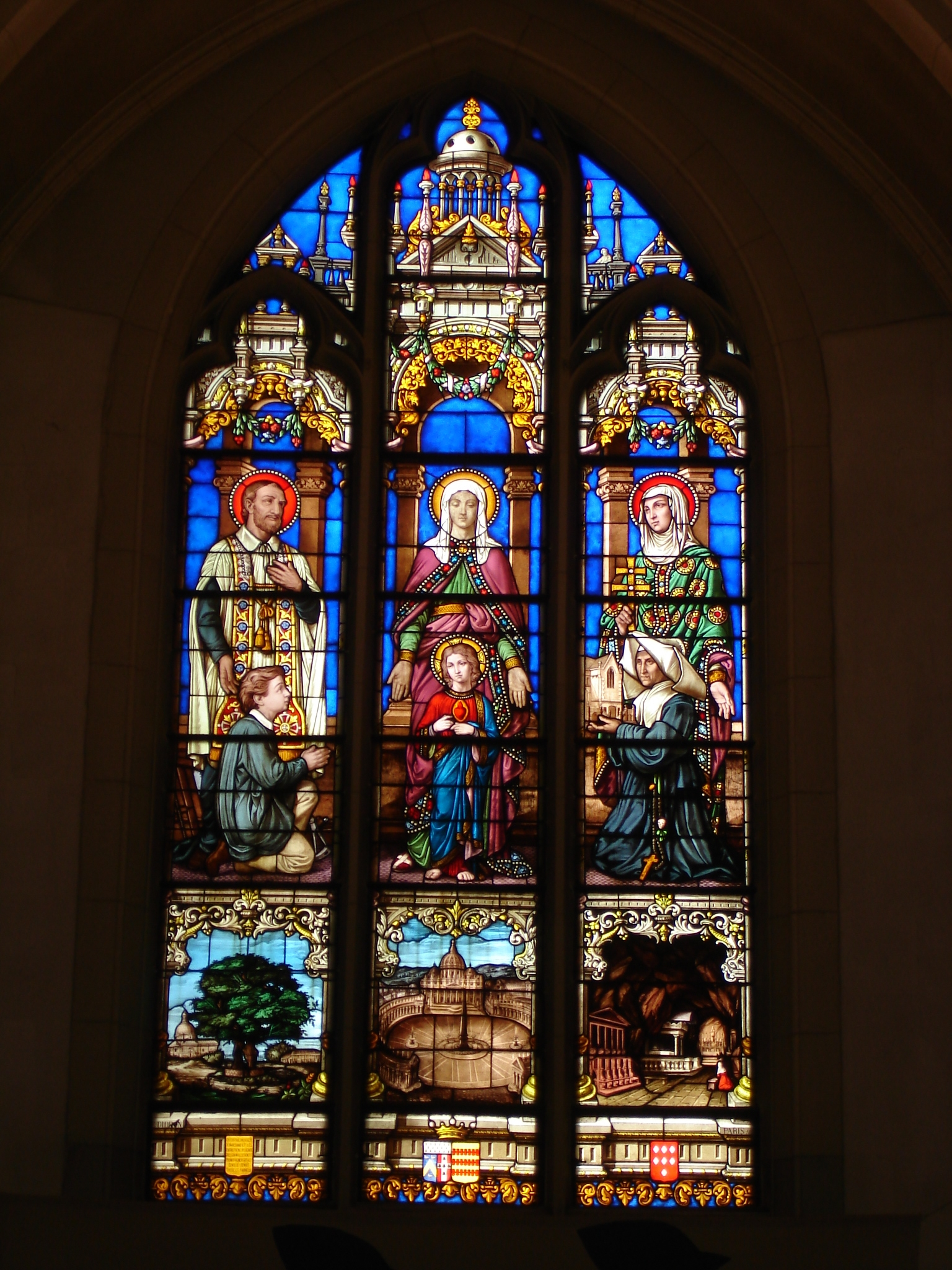
- Stained-glass windows in the church choir depicting Sister Rosalie
- Church of Sainte-Rosalie
- 48°49′48″N 2°50′59″E
- Location: 13th arrondissement of Paris
- Country: France
- Denomination: Roman Catholic Church

Sainte-Rosalie (French pronunciation: [sɛ̃t ʁo.za.li]) is a Roman Catholic church in the 13th arrondissement of Paris, built in 1869 in the honour of Rosalie Rendu, also known as Sister Rosalie.

== Location ==
The church is located at n°50, boulevard Auguste-Blanqui, at the junction of rue Corvisart.

Located near the Métro stations: Corvisart and Place d'Italie.

== History ==
The church is part of a charitable foundation created by the Abbot Le Rebours, curate of La Madeleine (1822–1894) given over to the Lazarists (founded by Vincent de Paul).

A chapel bearing the name Chapelle Sainte-Rosalie was constructed in 1859 on a large site the Abbot had acquired on the now defunct Rue de Gentilly. He had the chapel built to recognise Sister Rosalie's good work for the needy of the quarter in the first half of the 19th century.

In 1867, the land was expropriated for the creation of the short Avenue de la Sœur Rosalie, which joins the Place d'Italie. With the proceeds of compulsory purchase, another plot nearby was acquired, on the corner of rue Corvisart and the then boulevard des Gobelins. The new chapel was constructed from 1867 to 1869.

In 1903, the Lazardists were ejected and replaced by diocesan priests, to return again in 1922. On 29 September 1963, the chapel was elevated to church status when it became l'église Sainte-Rosalie. In 1971, the Lazardists once again fell from grace, and were replaced by diocesan priests.

== Gallery ==
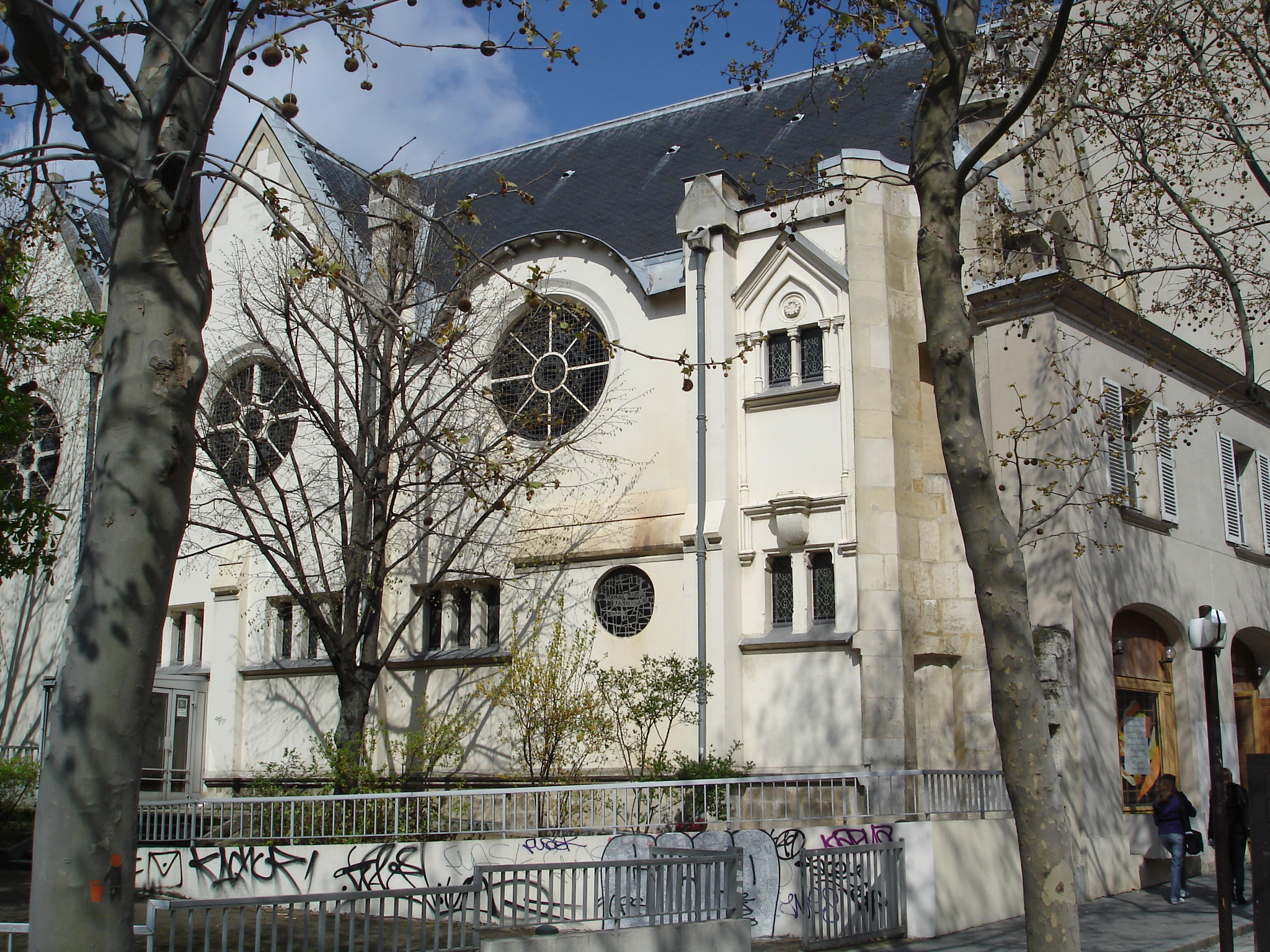
L'église Sainte-Rosalie- side view

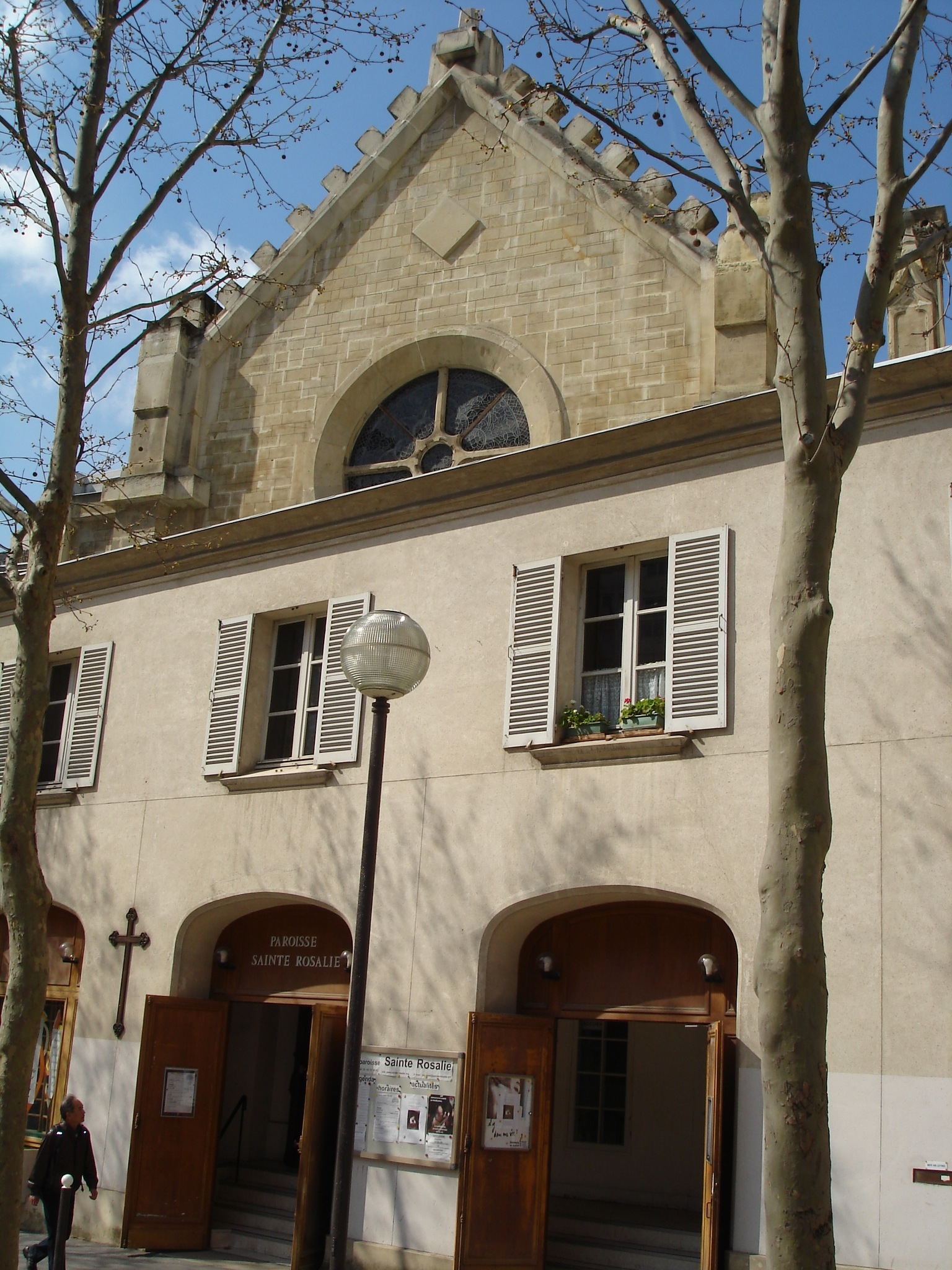
L'église Sainte-Rosalie- front entrance

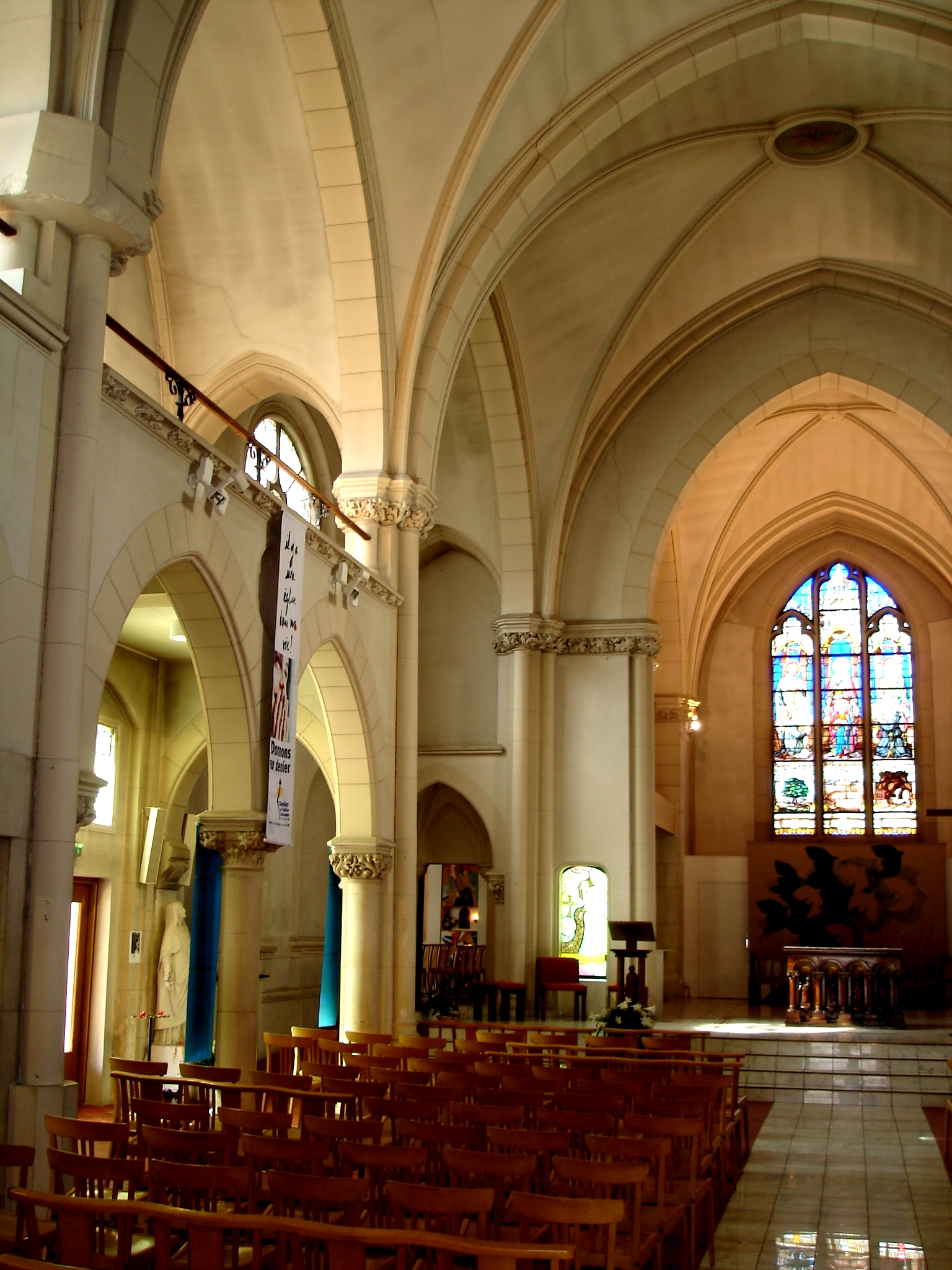
L'église Sainte-Rosalie – intérior

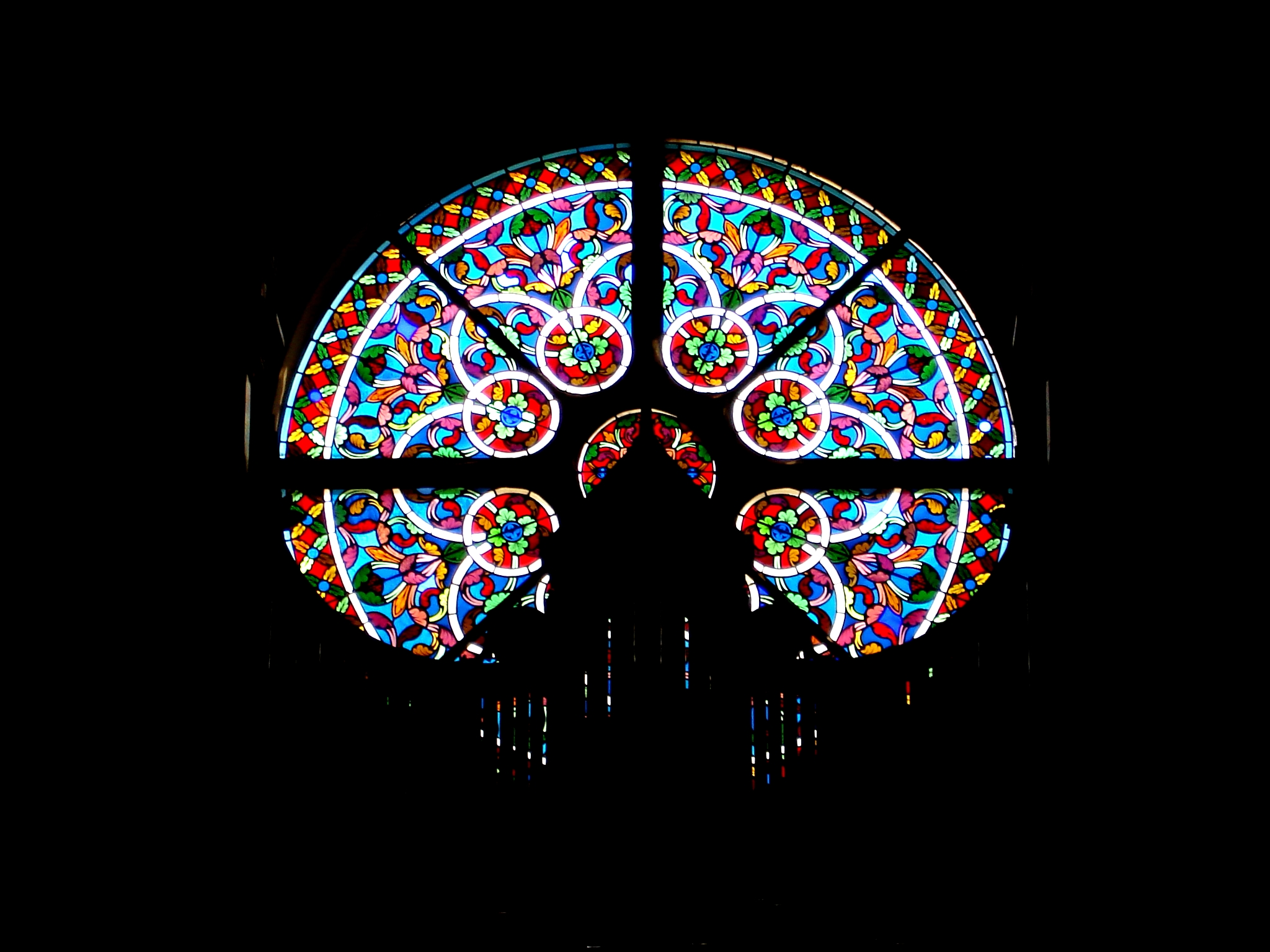
L'église Sainte-Rosalie – stained glass window

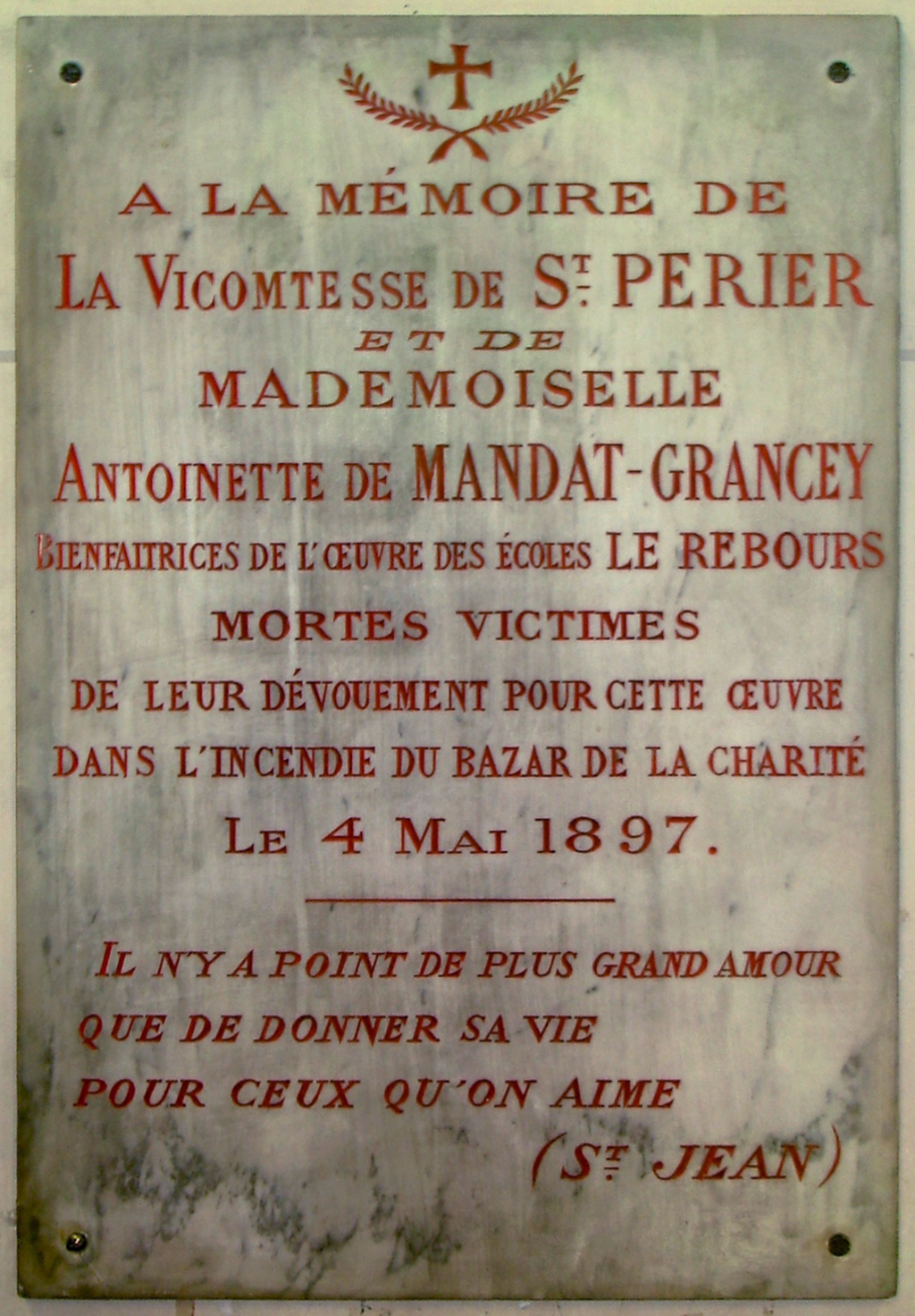
commemorative plaque in the church
