= Jean Liebault =

French doctor and agronomist

Jean Liébault (1535 – 21 June 1596) was a doctor and agronomist, born in Dijon.

He married Nicole Estienne, who published several writings about marriage, in which she condemned domestic violence and a large age difference between spouses. His father-in-law was Charles Estienne, author of the Praedieum rusticum. Liébault substantially altered and extended Estienne's book, resulting in a French text La Maison Rustique (first translated into English by Richard Surflet as "The Countrey Farme" in 1600, with an expanded edition published in 1616). He translated or authored the medical textbook Trois Livres appartenans aux infirmitez et maladies des femmes. He recorded the first known description of hot flashes from menopause in the medical literature.

== Bibliography ==
- Louis-Gabriel Michaud, Biographie universelle ancienne et moderne : histoire par ordre alphabétique de la vie publique et privée de tous les hommes avec la collaboration de plus de 300 savants et littérateurs français ou étrangers, 2e édition, 1843-1865 [détail édition]
- Antonio Saltini, Storia delle scienze agrarie, t.I Dalle origini al Rinascimento, Edagricole, Bologna 1984, pp. 257–269
