= Boulevard Auguste-Blanqui =

- Location within Paris
- Length: 1,040 m (3,410 ft)
- Width: 68 to 70 m (223 to 230 ft)
- Arrondissement: 13th
- Coordinates: 48°49′48″N 2°20′51″E
- From: 12, place d'Italie
- To: 77, rue de la Santé

Construction
- Denomination: 17 janvier 1905

The Boulevard Auguste-Blanqui (French pronunciation: [bulvaʁ oɡyst blɑ̃ki]) is a boulevard in the 13th arrondissement of Paris. It is one of the main arteries linking the Place d'Italie with the Place Denfert-Rochereau.

The boulevard is 1040 metres long, and approximately 70 metres wide, it starts from the Place d'Italie and extends to Rue de la Santé, on the edge of the 14th arrondissement, where it becomes the Boulevard Saint-Jacques. It traverses the former valley of the Bièvre.

The boulevard is named after the French thinker and socialist revolutionary Louis Auguste Blanqui (1805–1881).

Located near the Metro stations: Place d'Italie, Glacière, Saint-Jacques and Corvisart.

== History ==
The boulevard occupies the site of the ancient Wall of the Farmers-General. Originally, the roadways ran alongside the wall, which was knocked down in the 1860s.

Their former names were :

- on the outside was the Boulevard d'Italie between Place d'Italie and Rue de la Glacière,
  - but which became the Boulevard de la Glacière beyond Rue de la Glacière,
- on the inside was Boulevard des Gobelins between Place d'Italie and Rue de la Glacière (as distinct from the Avenue des Gobelins which also starts from the Place d'Italie)
  - but which became Boulevard Saint-Jacques beyond Rue de la Glacière.

=== Central reservation ===
- The central reservation of the boulevard lies directly underneath the entire width of the overhead line 6. At its junction with Rue de la Glacière, there is a basketball court, and a "boulodrome", for playing boules close to the Corvisart métro station.
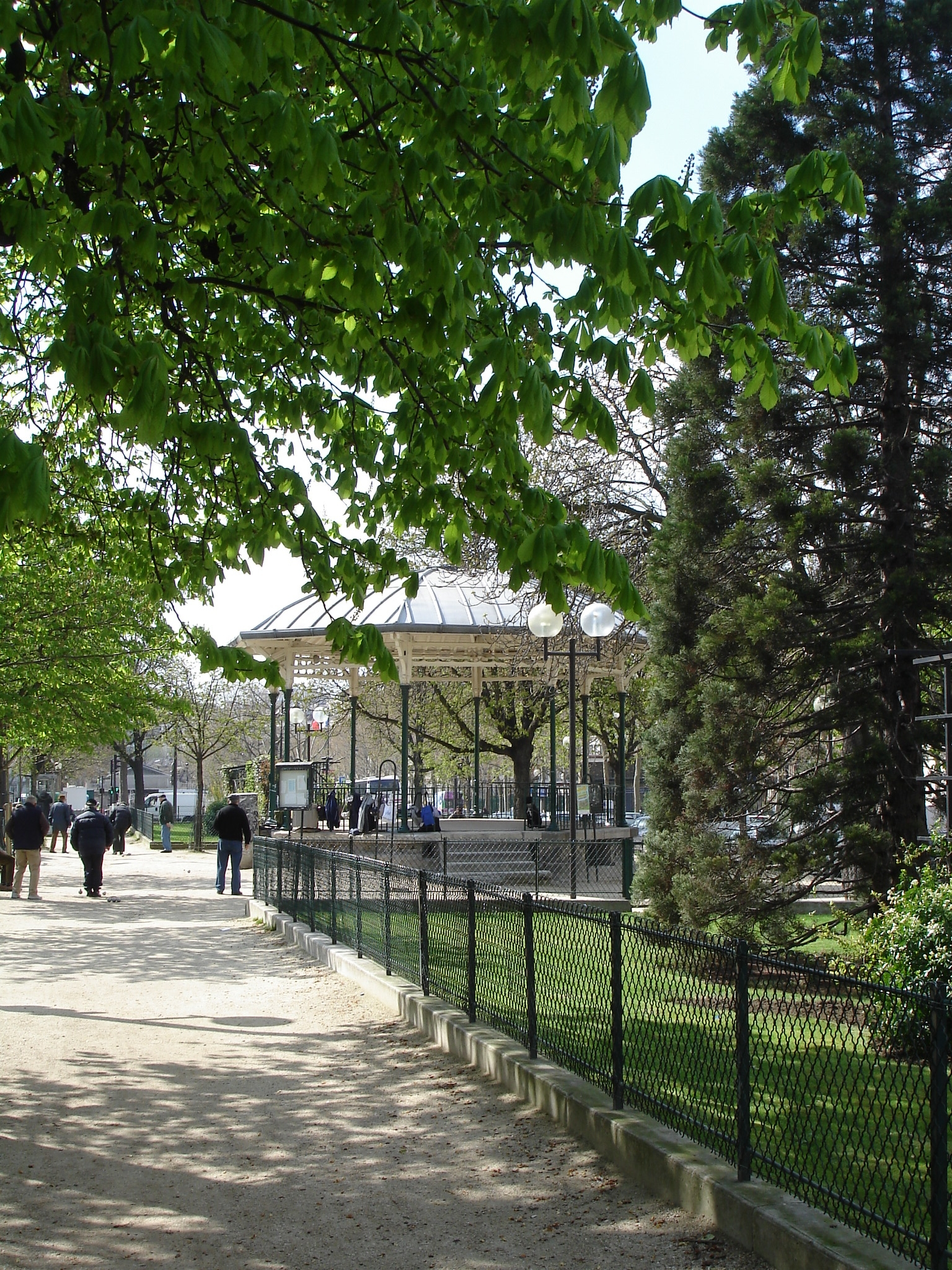
The "boulodrome" and musical kiosk

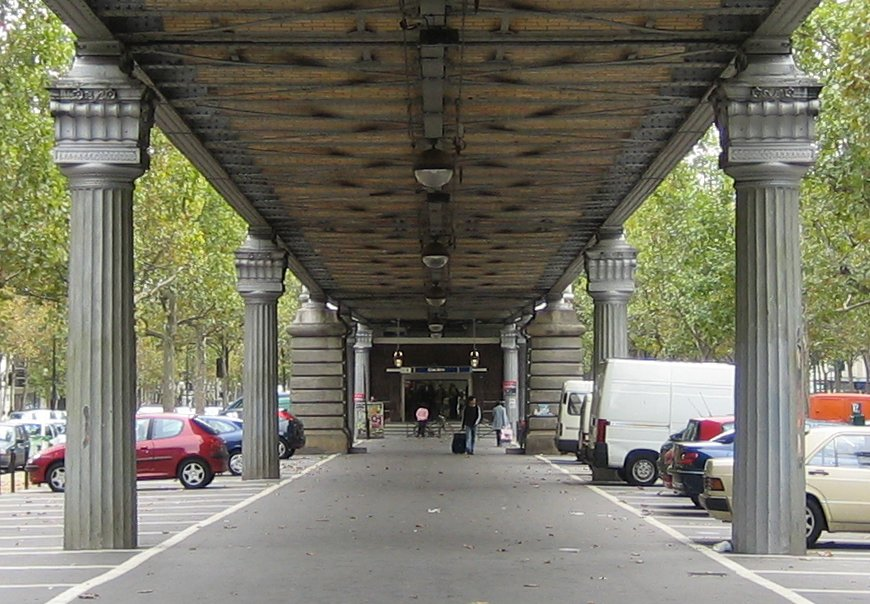
The central reservation below the métro's overhead section

== Notable addresses ==
- Close to the Place d'Italie, is a memorial dedicated to the "Children of the 13th arrondissement who died for France."
- 18, Boulevard Auguste-Blanqui – École Estienne, the Graduate School of Arts and Printing Industry.

Street number	Description	Image	Notes
n°25	former residence of Auguste Blanqui		Plaque inscription: "In this house lived from his release from prison in 1878 until his death on 1 January 1881; Great revolutionary AUGUSTE BLANQUI. 40 years of prison never dented his loyalty to the working class cause.' His example and his lessons Have notivated the heroes of 1848 and of the commune.
n°18, (junction of rue Abel-Hovelacque)	École Estienne (Ecole Supérieure Estienne des Arts et Industries Graphiques)		School for graphic arts inaugurated in 1896 in honour of the Estienne family of engravers of 16th century. The roofwork of the 1,200 m^{2} workshop was constructed by the company owned by Gustav Eiffel
n°50 (junction of rue Corvisart)	Église Sainte-Rosalie		
n°69	haltegarderie (children's nursery)		There is a commemorative bust of Ernest Rousselle (1836–1896), president of the Seine Conseil général, a dedicated activist on children's matters, and on abandoned children.
n°80	Le Monde building		Former headquarters of Air France, reworked by Bouygues
