= Glacière station =

Metro station in Paris, France

Glacière
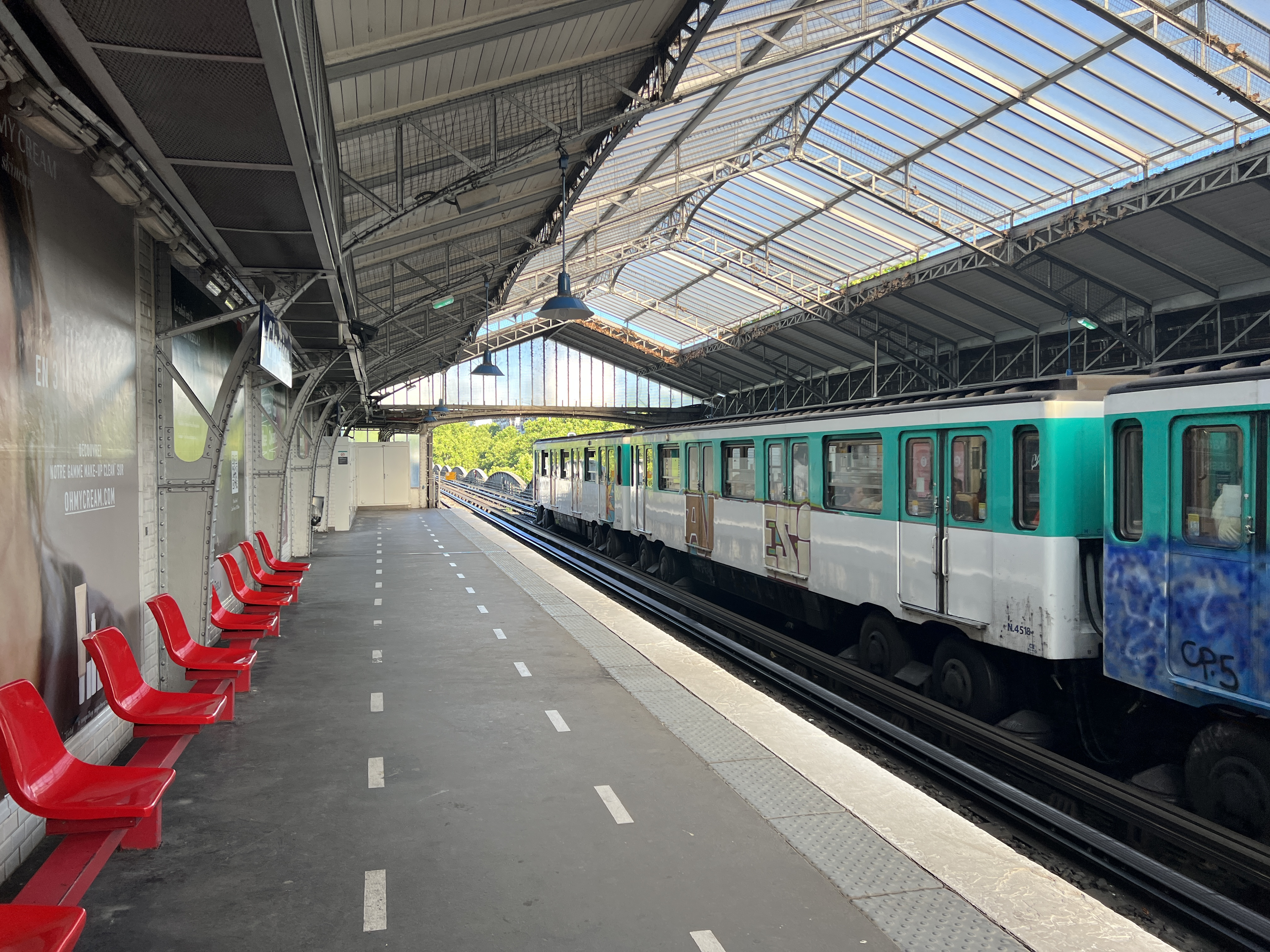

General information
- Location: 13th arrondissement of Paris; Île-de-France; France
- Coordinates: 48°49′52″N 2°20′36″E
- System: Paris Métro station
- Owner: RATP
- Operator: RATP

Other information
- Fare zone: 1

History
- Opened: 24 April 1906

Services
Preceding station	Paris Metro	Following station
Saint-Jacques towards Charles de Gaulle–Étoile	Line 6	Corvisart towards Nation
Location
- Location within Paris

Glacière (French pronunciation: [ɡlasjɛʁ]) is an elevated station of the Paris Métro serving line 6 in the 13th arrondissement.

== Location ==
The elevated station overlooks Boulevard Auguste-Blanqui, northwest of its intersection with the Rue de la Glacière. Oriented approximately along a north-west / south-east axis, it is located between the stations Saint-Jacques and Corvisart.

== History ==
The station opened as part of the former Line 2 South on 24 April 1906, when it was extended from Passy to Place d'Italie. On 14 October 1907 Line 2 South was incorporated into Line 5. It was incorporated into line 6 on 12 October 1942. The station is named after the Rue de la Glacière (meaning "iceworks street") because, before the invention of the electric refrigerator, ice was collected in the area from the ponds of the river Bièvre during the winter and stored for the summer in wells built for the purpose. It was the location of the Barrière de Glacière (or Barrière de l'Ourcine during the French Revolution), a gate built for the collection of taxation as part of the Wall of the Farmers-General; the gate was built between 1784 and 1788 and demolished in the nineteenth century.

== Passenger services ==
=== Access ===
The station has a single access called Boulevard Auguste-Blanqui, leading to the median strip of this boulevard, to the right of no. 124.

=== Station layout ===
Platform level	Side platform, doors will open on the right
Platform level	toward Charles de Gaulle – Étoile	← toward Charles de Gaulle – Étoile (Saint-Jacques)
Platform level	toward Nation	toward Nation (Corvisart) →
Platform level	Side platform, doors will open on the right

1F	Mezzanine for platform connection

Street Level

=== Platforms ===
Glacière is a standard configuration elevated station. It has two platforms separated by metro tracks, all covered by a glass roof in the style of the steel railway station marquees of the time. The vertical walls are covered with white ceramic tiles on the inside and brick with geometric patterns on the outside. The advertising frames are white ceramic and the name of the station is written in Parisine type font on enamelled plates fixed to the metal frame. The Motte style seats are red. The lighting is semi-direct, projected on the ground by blue ceiling lights, on the walls by partially concealed tubes and on the frame by projectors of blue light. The accesses to the station are made through the western end.

=== Bus connections ===
The station is served by Lines 21 and 64 of the RATP Bus Network.

== Places of interest ==
Victor Hugo located an episode of Les Misérables in the nearby Rue du Champ de l'Alouette, where there used to be tanneries. The headquarters of the daily newspaper Le Monde occupies the building at 80 Boulevard Auguste-Blanqui since 2004.

== Gallery ==
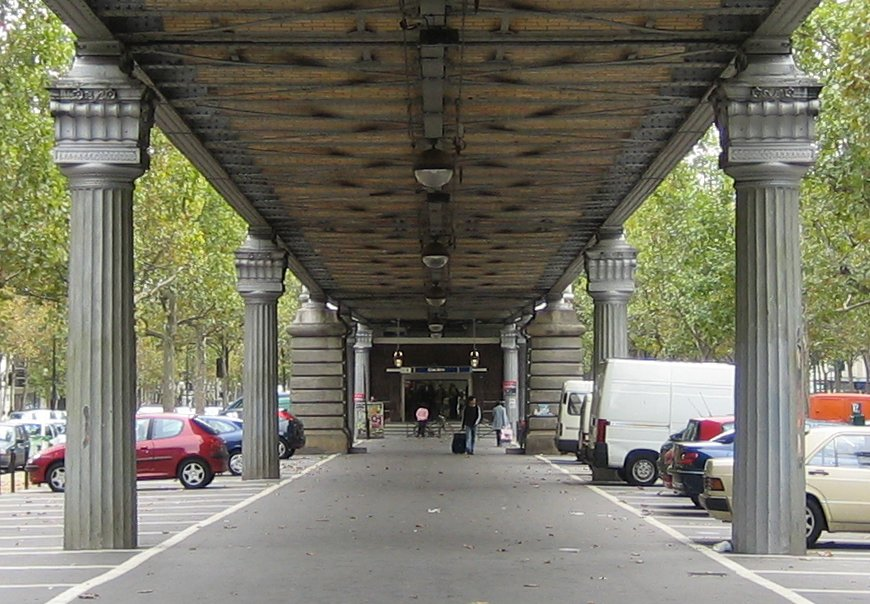
Under the viaduct at Glacière
