= Ortensio Lando =

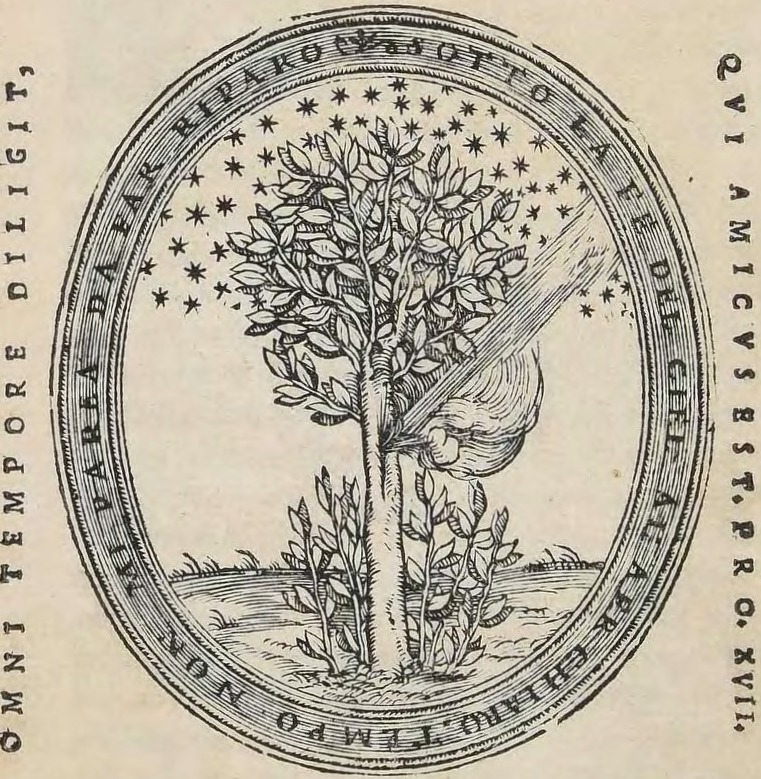
Title page of Paradossi, cioè sentenze fuori del comun parere

Ortensio Lando or Landi (c. 1510 – c. 1558) was an Italian writer of satires and translations. He is also sometimes known by a Latin pseudonym of Hortensius Tranquillus.

== Biography ==
Ortensio Lando was born in Milan, Italy, and around the year 1523 he entered an Augustinian monastery, receiving the name of Jeremiah. He led a peripatetic life, living in Venice, Padua, Genoa, Siena, Ferrara, Lyon, and Naples. He may or may not have completed a degree in medicine at Bologna. He is said to have acquired the name Tranquillus at his induction to the Accademia degli Elevati in Ferrara. Biographical details of Lando are not well ascertained.

He is the author of Paradossi, cioè sentenze fuori del comun parere, a series of 20 short essays arguing for an anti-dogmatic (contrarian) propositions using both rudimentary sophistry and some erudition based on classic mythologies, biblical topics, or historical events. Among the twenty chapters are, for example, propositions asserting that ugliness is better than being beautiful; poverty is better than wealth; ignorance is better than wisdom; being a bastard is preferable to being legitimate; or that it is better if the wife is sterile versus being fertile. The works of Lando, while influential, were not universally praised by later reviewers.

Lando is described by Sotheby and Wilkinson as "filled with singular and curious Paradoxes, but several of them so licentious and blasphemous that even the French translator Charles Estienne, was compelled to omit them in the version he published in 1553". Jacob Burckhardt in assessing Landi's descriptions of his contemporary Italy states the man: "is so fond of playing hide-and-seek with his own name, and fast-and-loose with historical facts, that even when he seems to be most in earnest, he must be accepted with caution and only after close examination."

Peer of Pietro Aretino and Doni, friend to Étienne Dolet (later incinerated for heresy), he is said to have left the Order of Saint Augustine and became an apostate. All of his books landed on the Index Librorum Prohibitorum by the Roman Catholic church, and Paradossi, cioè sentenze fuori del comun parere in particular was widely banned and copies of it were confiscated.

== Works ==
Among his published works are:

- Cicero relegatus et Cicero revocatus (1534). Essay on Cicero.
- Paradosi cive sententie fuori del comun parere (1545)
- Sermoni funebri de vari authori nella morte de diversi animali (1548)
- Lettere di molte valorose Donne, nelle quali chiaramente appare non esser ne di eloquentia ne di dottrina alle huomini inferiore (1549)
- Lettere della molto illustre Signora Lucretia Gonzaga da Gazuolo con gran diligentia raccolte, e a la gloria del sesso femenile nuovamente in luce poste (1552), praizing the wife of one of his patrons
- Commentario delle più notabili, & mostruose cose d'Italia, & altri luoghi: di lingua Aramea in italiana tradotto. Con un breve catalogo de gli inventori delle cose che si mangiano et beveno, novamente ritrovato (1553)
- Quattro libri de Dubbi con le solutioni a ciascun Dubbio accomodate or Dubbi Naturali in vari tempi propostimi da curiosi ingegni con brievi et ispedite solutioni (1552)
- Oracoli de moderni ingegni si d'huomini come di donne, ne'quali unita si vede tutta la philosophia morale, che fra molti Scrittori sparsa si leggeva, with prologue by Bartolomeo Testa (1550)
