= Étienne (disambiguation) =

Étienne is a given name. Other uses include:

== People ==
- Étienne (surname), a list of people named Étienne, Etienne or Ettienne
- Etienne (artist), pen name of Dom Orejudos (1933–1991), American erotic artist, dancer and choreographer
- Étienne (Canadian musician), stage name of Steven Langlois (born 1971), Canadian musician and educationist

== Other uses ==
- "Étienne" (song), a 1987 single by French artist Guesch Patti
- Étienne (film), a 1933 French comedy drama film
- Etienne!, a 2009 film by Jeff Mizhushima
- Étienne Fjord, Graham Land, Antarctica

== See also ==
- Etiene Medeiros (born 1991), Brazilian swimmer
