= Corvisart station =

Metro station in Paris, France

Corvisart
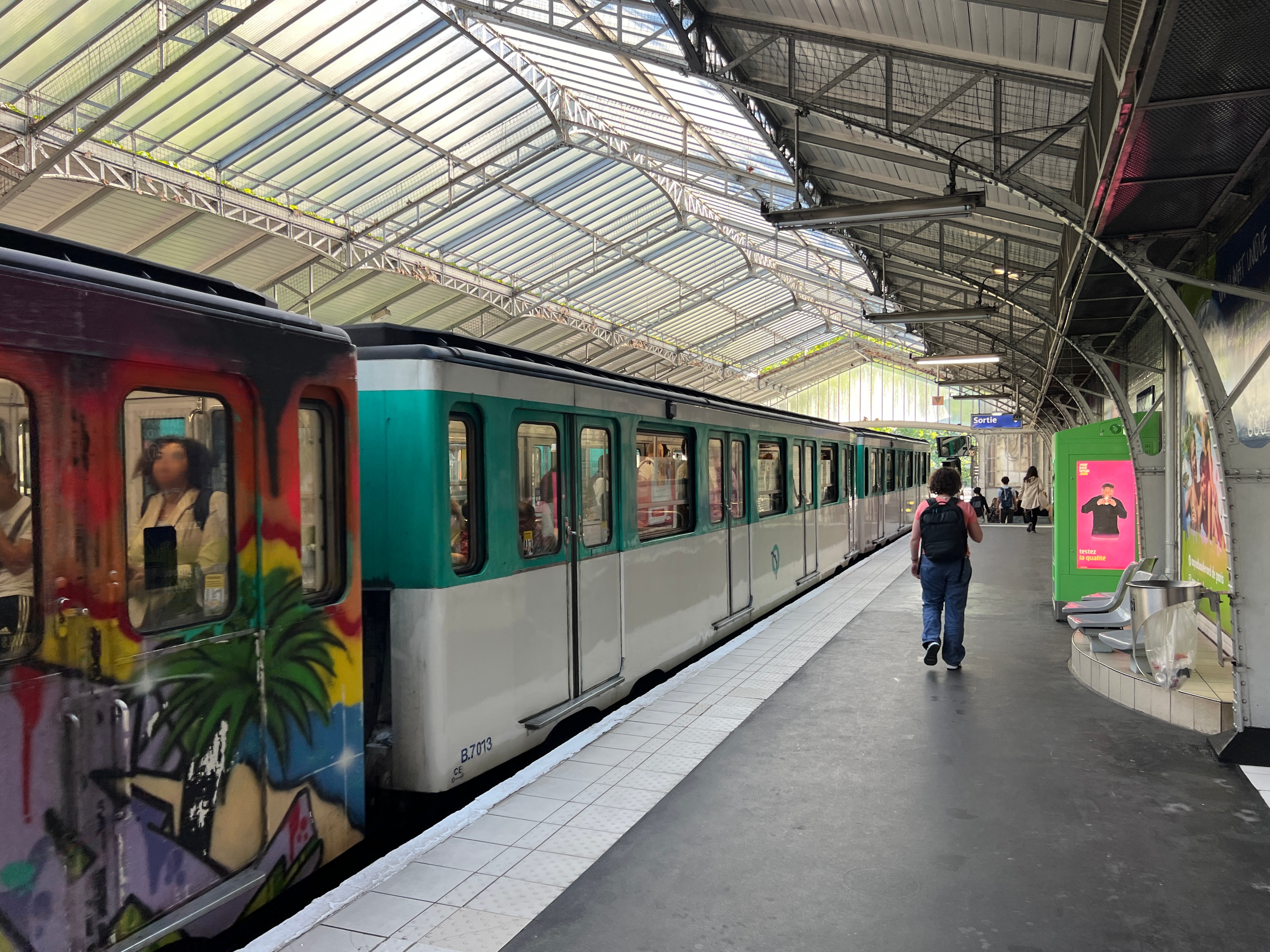

General information
- Location: 13th arrondissement of Paris; Île-de-France; France
- Coordinates: 48°49′47″N 2°21′02″E
- System: Paris Métro station
- Owner: RATP
- Operator: RATP

Other information
- Fare zone: 1

History
- Opened: 24 April 1906

Services
| Preceding station | Paris Metro | Following station |
|---|---|---|
| Glacière towards Charles de Gaulle–Étoile | Line 6 | Place d'Italie towards Nation |
Location
- Location within Paris

Corvisart (French pronunciation: [kɔʁvizaʁ]) is an elevated station of the Paris Métro serving line 6 at the intersection of the Rue du Corvisart and the Boulevard Auguste Blanqui in the 13th arrondissement.

== Location ==
The station is located above ground in the middle of Boulevard Auguste-Blanqui to the east of the intersection with Rue Corvisart.

== History ==
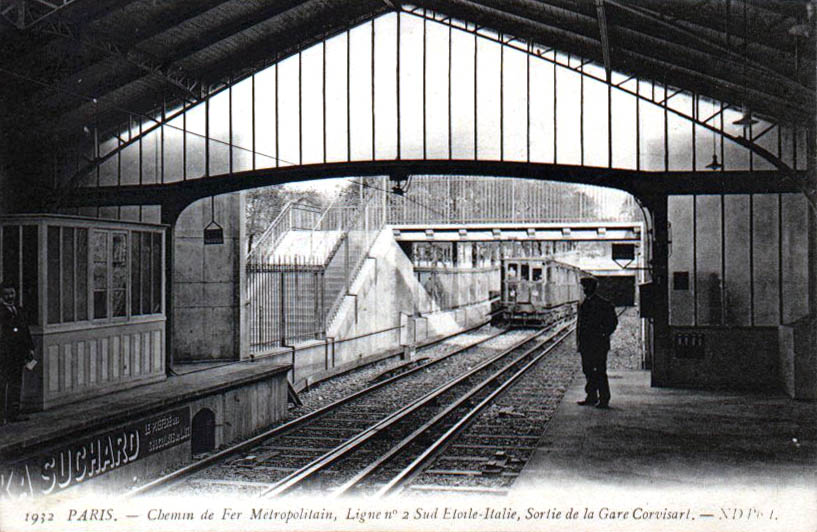
The station in 1906

The station opened as part of the former Line 2 South on 24 April 1906, when it was extended from Passy to Place d'Italie. On 14 October 1907 Line 2 South was incorporated into Line 5. It was incorporated into line 6 on 12 October 1942. It is named after the Rue Corvisart, which commemorates Jean Nicolas des Marels, Baron Corvisart (1755–1821), who was an important figure in the history of French medicine, specialising in the lungs and the heart, and the personal doctor of Napoleon. Nearby was the location of the Barrière de Croulebarbe, a gate built for the collection of taxation as part of the Wall of the Farmers-General; the gate was built between 1784 and 1788 and demolished in the nineteenth century.

In 2018, 2,819,792 travelers entered this station, which places it at the 201st position of metro stations for its attendance.

== Passenger services ==
=== Access ===
The station has two entrances located on the central reservation of Boulevard Auguste-Blanqui, one of which overlooks the no. 57 and the other side at no. 50.

=== Station layout ===
| Platform level | Side platform, doors will open on the right |
| Platform level | toward Charles de Gaulle – Étoile | ← toward Charles de Gaulle – Étoile (Glacière) |
| Platform level | toward Nation | toward Nation (Place d'Italie) → |
| Platform level | Side platform, doors will open on the right |

| 1F | Mezzanine for platform connection |

Street Level

=== Platforms ===
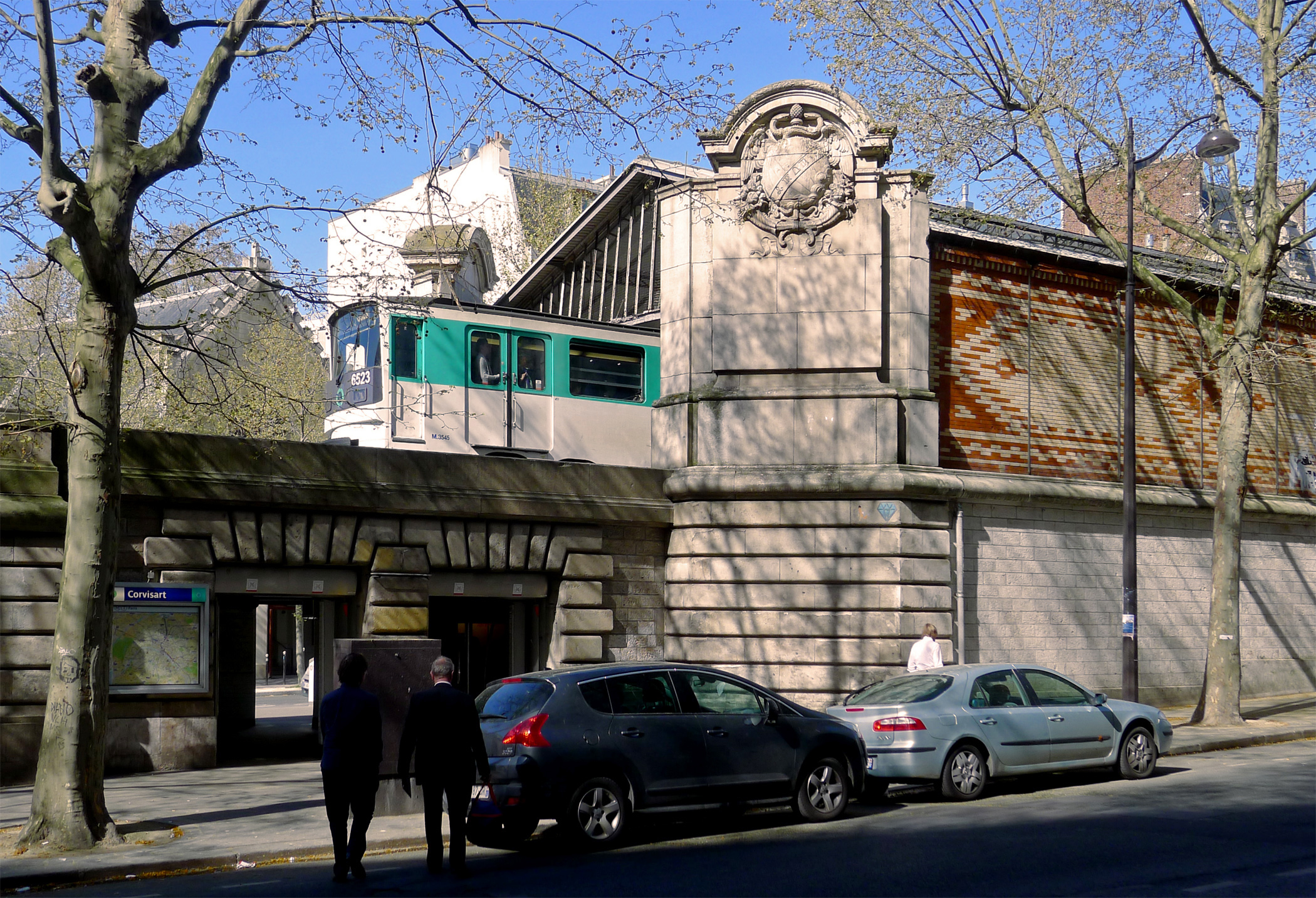
Outside.

Corvisart is an elevated station of standard configuration. It has two platforms separated by the metro tracks, all covered with a glass roof style awning unique of the stations of the time. The vertical walls are covered with bevelled white ceramic tiles on the inside, and bricks drawing geometric patterns on the outside. The advertising frames are metallic, and the name of the station is inscribed in capital letters on enamelled plaques. The perimeter of the platforms are tiled, as are the convex benches topped with grey Motte seats. Lighting is provided by independent transverse tubes suspended from the frame. Access is via the western end via fixed staircase with the particularity of descending under the track exits.

=== Bus connections ===
The station is served by Lines 57, 64 and 67 of the RATP Bus Network.

== Nearby ==
The station is near the Butte-aux-Cailles neighbourhood and the French Institute for Research in Computer Science and Automation (INRIA).
