= Nicole Estienne =

French poet (c.1542–c.1588)

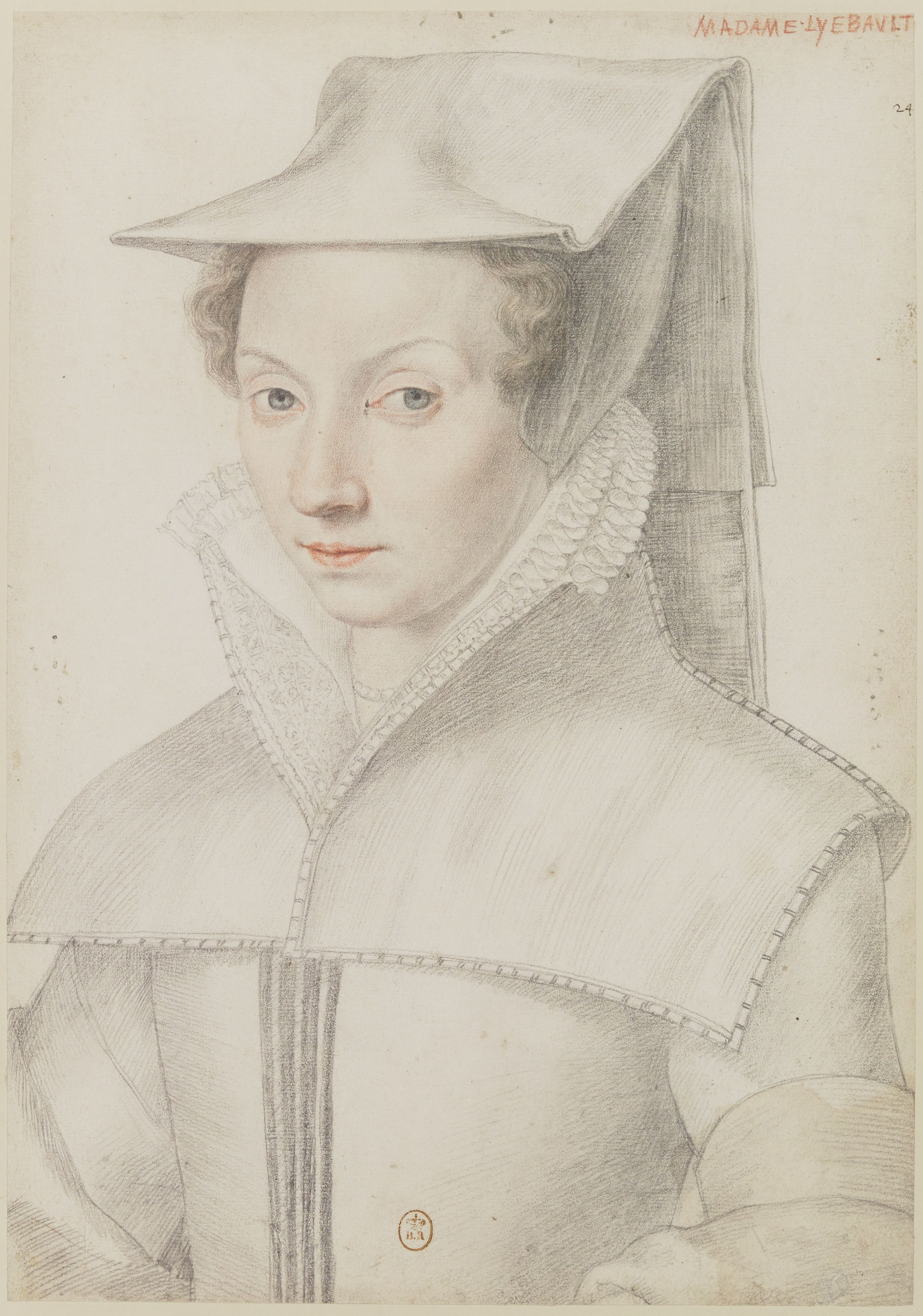
Nicole Estienne Portrait

Nicole Estienne (c.1542-c.1588) was a French poet of the Renaissance.

== Life and work ==
Her parents were Charles Estienne and Geneviève de Berly. Her father's family was influential in the printing business.

The writer Jacques Grévin became engaged to her and celebrated her in his collection L'Olimpe. The engagement was broken for unknown reasons. Nicole then married Jean Liebault, a physician from Dijon.

She wrote several works, some of which have survived. In response to Philippe Desportes's misogynist writings, she defended women in her Stanzes. Her best known work is Les Misères de la Femme mariée, où se peuvent voir les peines et tourmens qu’elle reçoit durant sa vie, in which she condemned big age differences between spouses and domestic violence.

Some of her poems were written as introductions to the work of other poets.

== Sources ==
- Diana Maury Robin; Anne R. Larsen; Carole Levin (2007). Encyclopedia of women in the Renaissance: Italy, France, and England. ABC-CLIO, Inc.
