= Saint-Jacques station =

Metro station in Paris, France

Saint-Jacques
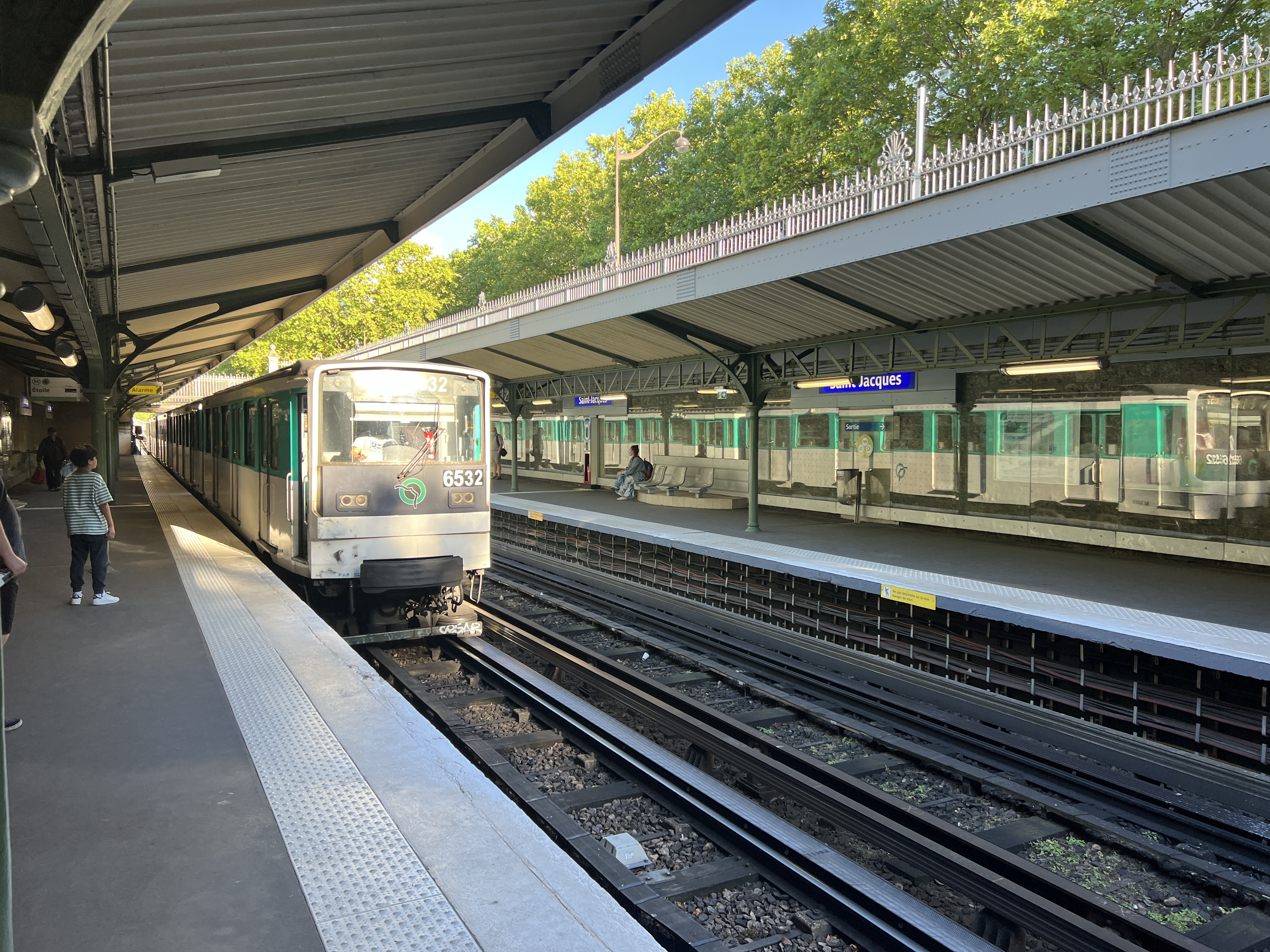

General information
- Location: 14th arrondissement of Paris; Île-de-France; France
- Coordinates: 48°49′58″N 2°20′13″E
- System: Paris Métro station
- Owner: RATP
- Operator: RATP

Other information
- Fare zone: 1

History
- Opened: 24 April 1906

Services
Preceding station	Paris Metro	Following station
Denfert-Rochereau towards Charles de Gaulle–Étoile	Line 6	Glacière towards Nation
Location
- Location within Paris

Saint-Jacques (French pronunciation: [sɛ̃ ʒak]) is a station on Line 6 of the Paris Métro. It serves Place Saint-Jacques in the 14th arrondissement. The Boulevard Saint-Jacques and Rue du Faubourg-Saint-Jacques also intersect the square. It is one of only a few Métro stations that have a combined entrance and ticket hall at street-level.

== Location ==
The station is located in the middle of the Boulevard Saint-Jacques, at the intersection with the Rue du Faubourg-Saint-Jacques and Rue de la Tombe-Issoire.

== History ==
The station opened as part of the former Line 2 South on 24 April 1906, when it was extended from Passy to Place d'Italie. On 14 October 1907, Line 2 South was incorporated into Line 5. It was incorporated into Line 6 on 12 October 1942.

Saint-Jacques station was one of a number of Paris locations of Stanley Donen's 1963 film Charade, starring Cary Grant and Audrey Hepburn.

== Name ==
The station is named after the Rue du Faubourg-Saint-Jacques, which was originally the Roman road to Orléans and main street of the Roman city of Lutetia. In the Middle Ages it became the pilgrimage route of St James (French: Saint-Jacques) from Paris to Santiago de Compostela in Spain. Hence the street inside Paris' wall became known as Rue Saint-Jacques and its extension outside the wall through suburban development (French: Faubourg), became known as the Rue du Faubourg-Saint-Jacques. The station was the location of the Barrière Saint-Jacques (known as the Barrière d'Arcueil during the French Revolution), a gate built for the collection of taxation as part of the Wall of the Farmers-General; the gate was built between 1784 and 1788 and demolished in the nineteenth century.

== Passenger services ==
=== Access ===
The only access to the station is on the central Boulevard Saint-Jacques, at the junction with the Rue du Faubourg-Saint-Jacques and La Tombe-Issoire. It is one of the few stations to have an edicule above the tracks, from which one accesses the public road and to the platforms.

=== Station layout ===
Platform level	Side platform, doors will open on the right
Platform level	toward Charles de Gaulle–Étoile	← toward Charles de Gaulle–Étoile (Denfert-Rochereau)
Platform level	toward Nation	toward Nation (Glacière) →
Platform level	Side platform, doors will open on the right

1F	Mezzanine for platform connection

Street Level

=== Platforms ===
Saint-Jacques is a standard configuration station. It has two platforms separated by metro tracks. On the other hand, it is distinguished by its location, on ground-level, and its decoration. In the direction of Charles de Gaulle–Étoile, the tracks enter underground at the exit of the station, while, towards Nation, they rise above the ground. The station is therefore aerial and the platforms are equipped with canopies supported by poles located in the middle of the platforms. The lighting is made by means of simple fluorescent tubes. The right walls are exposed stone protected by a backlit glazing. The name of the station, also backlit, is written with Parisine font. The seats are Motte style, gray, installed on circular masonry benches covered with flat gray tiles. This tiling also covered the ground until 2018 when it was replaced by asphalt. The platforms do not have advertising. This development is a unique case on the network.

=== Bus services ===
The station is served by lines 64 and 216 of the RATP Bus Network.

== Places of interest ==
Nearby are the La Santé Prison and the Institut d'astrophysique de Paris.

== Gallery ==
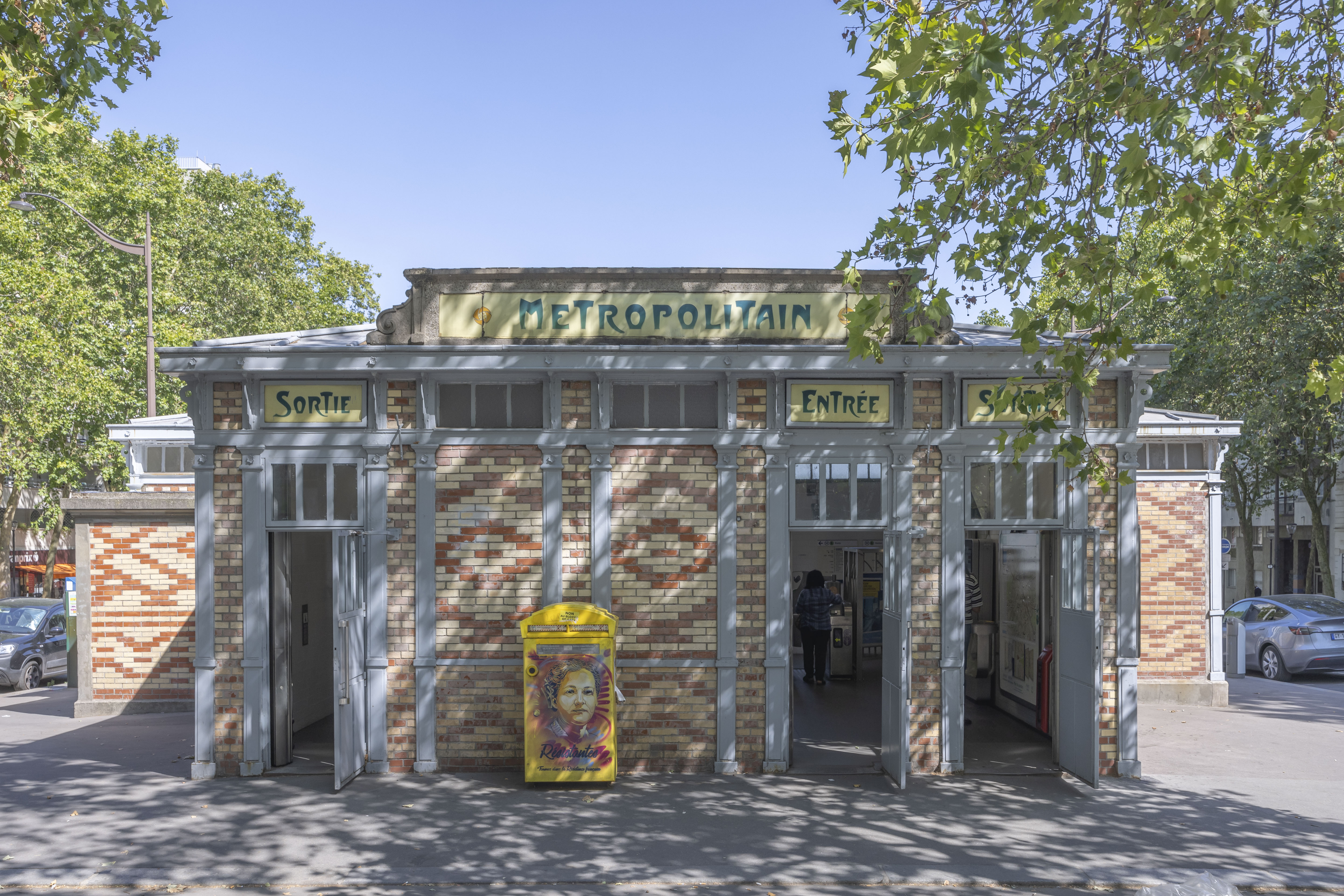
Entrance at Saint-Jacques

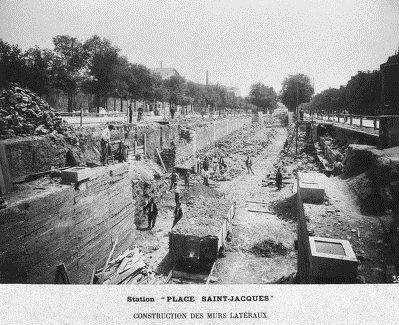
Erecting of the walls at Saint-Jacques in 1903

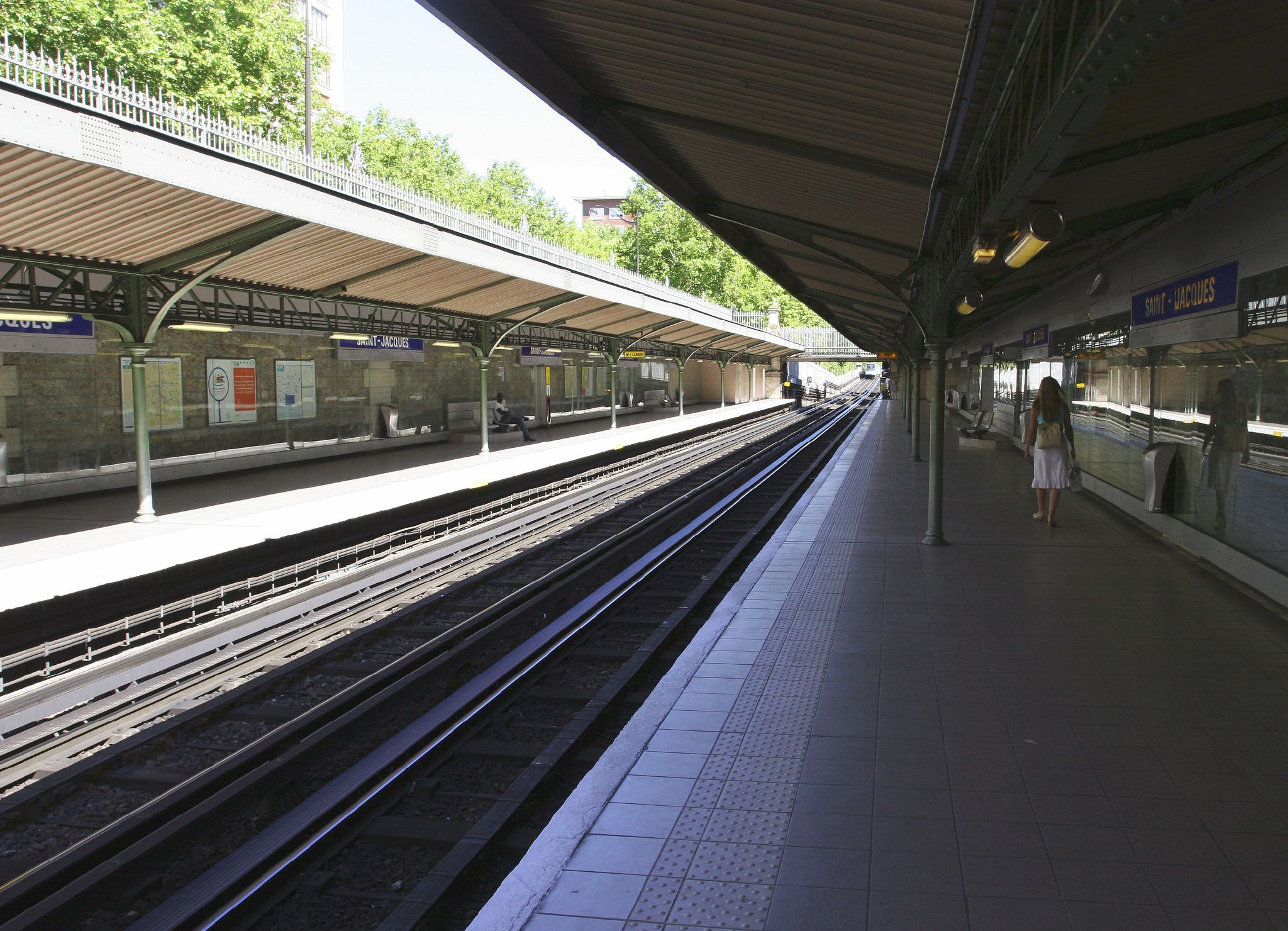
Line 6 platforms at Saint-Jacques
