= École Estienne =

Art school in Paris, France

Coordinates: 48.831°N 2.3522°E

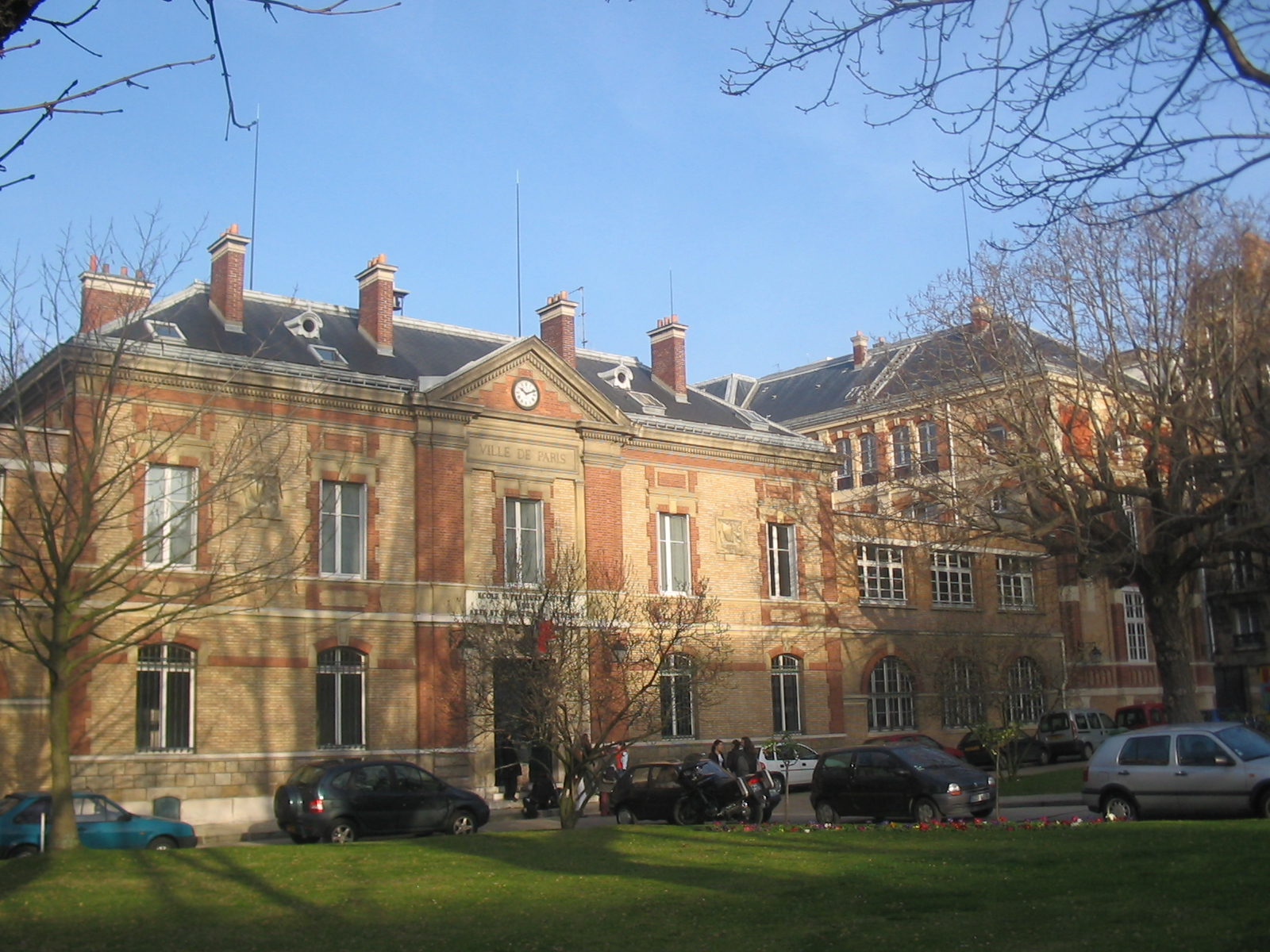
The front façade of the École Estienne.

L'école Estienne is the traditional name of the l'École supérieure des arts et industries graphiques (ESAIG) (Graduate School of Arts and Printing Industry). It is located at 18, Boulevard Auguste-Blanqui in the 13th arrondissement of Paris, not far from the Butte-aux-Cailles.

== History ==
In 1887 the anthropologist and linguist Abel Hovelacque proposed that the city of Paris should create a municipal school of arts and professional printing for industry. In November 1889 the school opened with 108 students in temporary premises on rue Vauquelin.

The school was named in honour of the Estienne family, a famous family of 16th-century printers including Henri Estienne (elder), Robert Estienne and Charles Estienne. Its vocation was to address the poor qualifications and standards of printing and book-making, covering theoretical and practical aspects.

The main building was designed by architect Menjot Dammartin and built in 1896. The frame of the machine shop (1200 m2) was built by the Gustave Eiffel workshops in Levallois-Perret. The premises were inaugurated in July 1896 by the President of France Félix Faure.

== Notable alumni ==
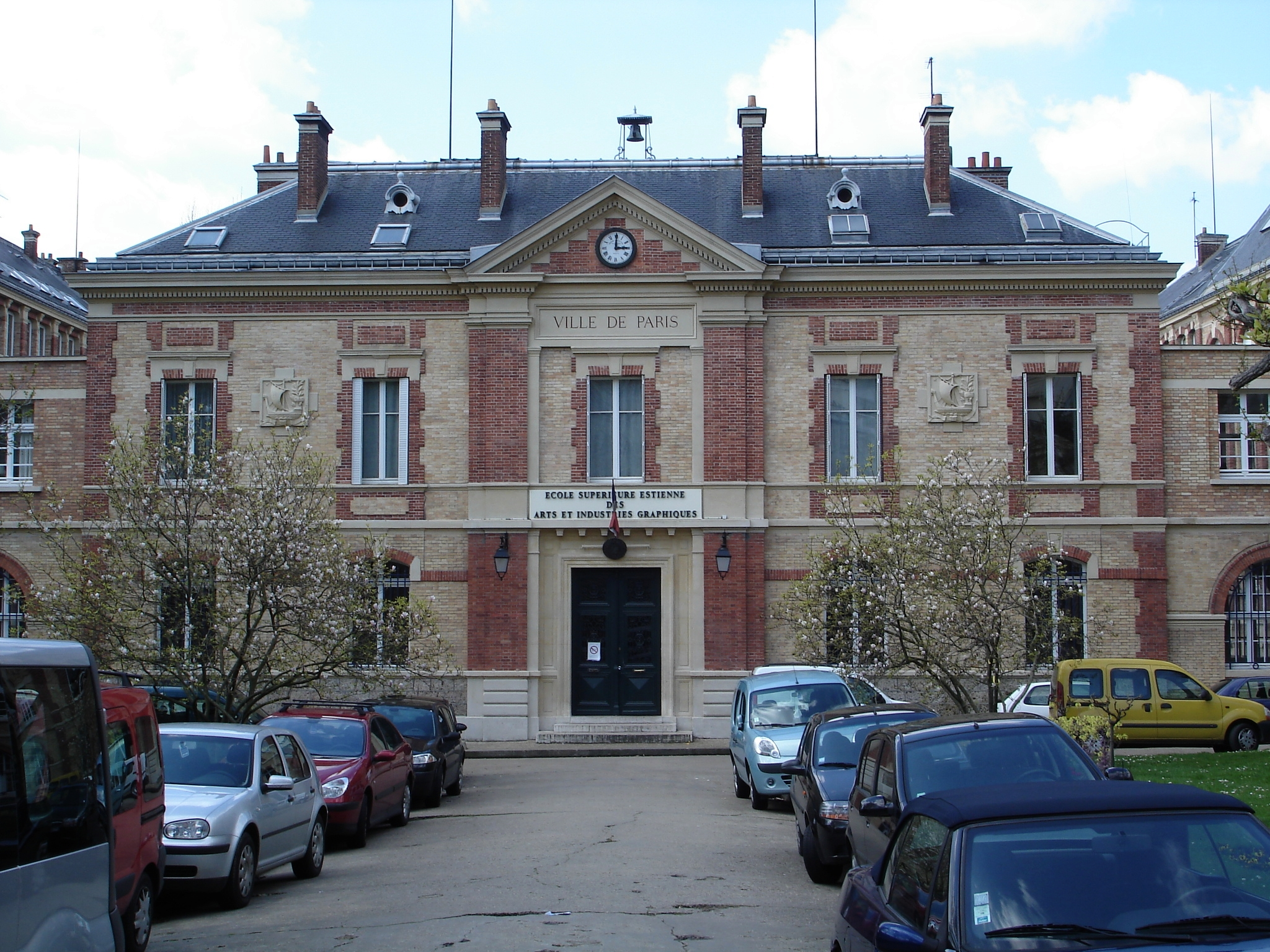
École Estienne

- Cabu (1938–2015), cartoonist
- Robert Doisneau (1912–1994), photographer
- Pierre Gandon (1899–1990)
- K. K. Hebbar (1911–1966), painter
- Patrick Malrieu, industrialist
- Léo Quievreux (born 1971), comic book author and illustrator
- Siné (1928–2016), cartoonist
- Xavier de Rosnay (1982), half of the duo Justice
