= Gérard Étienne =

Canadian writer (1936–2008)

- Born: Gérard Vergniaud Étienne; Cap-Haïtien, Haiti
- Died: December 14, 2008 (aged 72); Montreal, Quebec
- Writing career
- Language: French
- Years active: 1960-2008

Gérard Vergniaud Étienne (28 May 1936 – 14 December 2008) was a linguist, journalist and writer of poems, novels and essays.

== Biography ==
=== Haiti ===
Gérard Étienne wrote his first poems when only 13 and performed them on radio, but he left his paternal home at 15. Declaring that his father had been violent towards his mother because she did not share his Vodun religion, Étienne said that he had been terribly affected by his childhood.

In Port-au-Prince he took part in an uprising against the despotic regime of the U.S.-backed Paul Magloire. Arrested with Luc B. Innocent and Windsor Kléber Laferrière, he was imprisoned and tortured. Prison and torture had marked him deeply, but after Magloire was deposed in 1956, Étienne found the strength to pursue classical studies. As he was later to comment in an interview with Ghila Sroka, "The more we deny the people the right to exist, the more they express their disappointment in the arts, literature, music."

In 1958 he began a career as a journalist, teacher and writer. A follower of Haitian Marxist novelist and physician Jacques Stephen Alexis (himself murdered by the Tonton Macoute in 1961), he took part in a 1959 plot against the army-supported regime of François ("Papa Doc") Duvalier, for which he was arrested and tortured a second time.

Upon his release, Étienne published in rapid succession four books of poetry and two literary essays. He founded the "Samba" cultural group (later to become Haïti-littéraire). While teaching at colleges and a high school, he was simultaneously literary critic and reporter with the daily Le Nouvelliste (1961-1962) and Panorama (1962-1964). Étienne has followed parallel military and artistic trajectories, especially at Syto Cavé's Société des Messagers de l'art (1963) and the Haitian Air Corps, where as an air cadet he was assigned to the meteorology department (1955–1957).

With the publication of his first book of poetry Au milieu des larmes ("Amidst the tears") in 1960, he found himself a cultural and literary leader within his country. Following a long detention in Duvalier's prisons, he fled to Quebec as a refugee in August 1964.

== Quebec and New Brunswick ==
On his arrival in Montreal, he taught at the Lycée Da Silva (1964-1965) and worked as a reporter for the Métro Express and Quartier Latin newspapers. While studying literature at the Université de Montréal (1964–1970), he worked first in a factory and then as a hospital orderly at the Hôtel-Dieu de Montréal. He taught at the Cégep de Matane (1968-1970) and wrote for the newspaper La Voix Gaspe — a newspaper that ceased publication in 2012. In 1965 he published "Letters to Montreal," his first Canadian book. Since then, he continued to publish poems and stories; his work is in several French and Haitian anthologies and has been translated into English, Portuguese and German.

In his early years in Canada he had converted to Orthodox Judaism. In 1967 he married Natania Feuerwerker, whom he had met at the Université de Montréal. She was a daughter of the French jurist and Haganah fighter Antoinette Gluck (1912-2003) and the rabbi and historian David Feuerwerker (1912–1980). Étienne and his wife had two children, Joël and Michaëlla. He earned a Bachelor of Arts degree from the Université de Montréal (1968) and a PhD in linguistics from the University of Strasbourg (1974).

In 1967-68 he was editor of Lettres et Écritures, a journal published by the Université de Montréal's arts faculty in 1967-68; later in 1968 he founded the Théâtre de Matane.

From 1971 till his retirement in 2001 he was a journalism professor at the Université de Moncton. From 1972 to 1987 he wrote a column for the Montreal newspaper "Le Devoir". From 1974 to 1980 he also edited a review published by the Université de Moncton. Later he wrote for the now defunct daily Le Matin and the weeklies Le Voilier and Le Moniteur Acadien in Shediac, New Brunswick (1986-1987).

== Confrontation ==
Despite having suffered two comas and having undergone brain surgery, he continued to write to the weekly Le Voilier (1987–1989). In 1993, just before he was to appear for a Radio-Canada interview on Denise Bombardier's Raison Passion television show, Gérard Étienne was the victim of a bloody gang assault, a politically motivated attack that increased his determination to resist what he characterized as Haitian feudalism. He later wrote of the event in his 1998 book L'Injustice, la désinformation, le mépris de la loi ("Injustice, misinformation, disregard of the law"). Subsequently, to that assault, Étienne, through his columns in the Haïti-Observateur newspaper, continued his struggle for sustainable democratic change in his Haitian homeland. In this capacity, he published in 2008, through Éditions du Marais, an uncompromising play, Monsieur Le Président. The Racine actors group staged five performances of the play at the Théâtre Stanislas d'Outremont in April 2008.

Aside from his poetry and journalism, Étienne has also followed an academic career in the field of linguistics. He founded a new discipline in the humanities known as anthroposemiotics. His two essays on this subject, La Question raciale et raciste dans le roman québécois (1995) and La Femme noire dans le discours littéraire haïtien (1998), received critical acclaim in both Quebec and the broader francophone world.

== Awards and honours ==
Gérard Étienne in 1991 received the Medal of the Guadeloupe writers union, Association des écrivains de la Guadeloupe. In 1996, the International Council for Francophone Studies (Conseil international d'études francophones) conferred upon him the prestigious Maurice-Cagnon Certificate of Honour, for his exceptional contribution to world French-language studies. In 1997 he received the Gold Medal of the La Renaissance Française organization. He was also awarded the Cator trophy for his lifetime of work. As a member of the Quebec writers union, Union des écrivaines et des écrivains québécois (UNEQ), he notably worked during 2005–2006 on their language and sovereignty committee.

== Death ==
As reported by Bryan Miles in Le Devoir, Natania, the writer's widow, said: "He died in my arms" at their home in Côte Saint-Luc, "asking me to help him get dressed for writing." She added that he died "standing up totally straight, really."

== Selected works ==
=== Novels ===
- 1974: Le Nègre crucifié ("The Negro crucified "). Montreal: Éditions Francophone et Nouvelle Optique; Geneva: Éditions Métropolis (1990), ISBN 978-2883400085; Montreal/Paris: Balzac, 1994. ISBN 978-2921425384. Préface 2e edition, Franck Laraque, 3e edition Lexique Max Manigat, Postface 4 e édition Keeith L. Walker, Dartmouth College. 198 p. 2008. ISBN 9782-9809859-6-6 aussi disponible aux éditions Métropolis, Genève et en Haiti aux Presses Nationales. 5 e èdition Editions du Marais. Montréal
- 1979: Un Ambassadeur macoute à Montréal ("A Macoute ambassador in Montreal"). Montreal: Nouvelle Optique. Montreal: Éditions du Marais, 2011. ISBN 978-2923721194.
- 1983: Une Femme muette ("A mute woman"). Montreal/Paris: Éditions Nouvelle Optique/Silex. ISBN 978-2890170636. Editions du Marais (2018) préface 2e édition, Ginette Adamson ISBN 9782-923721-72-9
- 1987: La Reine Soleil Levée. Montreal: Éditions Guérin-Littérature; Geneva: Metropolis, 1989. ISBN 978-2760119741. An extract of this work was translated by Carrol F. Coates into English as "From The Queen Sun Rises" in Callaloo 15.2 (spring 1992): pp. 498–505; preceded by an interview with Gérard Étienne, trans. B. McRae Amos, Jr.
- 1991: La Pacotille. Montréal: l'Hexagone. Portions of this work were translated by Keith L. Walker into English. Chapter 9 appeared in La Revue Noire (summer 1998). Chapter 11, part 1 appeared in Fiery Spirits: Canadian writers of African descent (Ed. Ayanna Black). Toronto: Harper Collins, 1994: pp. 100–124 and 360-361. Chapter 11, part 2 appeared in Eyeing to the North Star (Ed. George Eliott Clark). Toronto: McClelland & Stewart, 1997: pp. 19–25.
- 1998: Le Bacoulou. Genève. Éditions Métropolis. ISBN 9782883400689
- 2000: Maître-Clo, ou la romance en do mineur ("Master Clo, or romance in C minor"). Montréal/Paris: Balzac. ISBN 978-2913907119.
- 2001: Vous n'êtes pas seul ("You are not alone"). Montreal/Paris: Balzac; Montreal, Éditions du Marais, 2011. ISBN 978-2921468701.
- 2002: Au cœur de l'anoréxie ("At the heart of anorexia"). Montreal: CIDIHCA.
- 2004: Au bord de la falaise ("At the edge of the cliff". Montreal: CIDIHCA.
- 2018: ''Une Femme muette ("A mute woman").Editions du Marais (2018) préface 2e édition, Ginette Adamson ISBN 9782-923721729.

• 2018 : Le Bacoulou 2, Editions du Marais, Montréal, préface Danielle Dumontet. ISBN 9782923721712

=== Theatre ===
- 2008: Monsieur le Président. Montreal: Éditions du Marais. ISBN 978-2980985911

=== Poetry ===
- 1960: Au milieu des larmes ("Amidst the tears"). Port-au-Prince: Togiram Press.
- 1960: Plus large qu'un rêve ("Wider than a dream"). Port-au-Prince: Éditions Dorsainvil.
- 1961: La Raison et mon amour ("Reason and my love". Port-au-Prince: Presses Port-au-princiennes.
- 1963: Gladys. Port-au-Prince: Éditions Panorama.
- 1966: Lettre à Montréal ("Letter to Montreal"). Montreal: L'Estérel.
- 1972: Dialogue avec mon ombre ("Dialogue with my shadow "). Montreal: Éditions francophones du Canada.
- 1982: Cri pour ne pas crever de honte. Montreal: Nouvelle Optique. ISBN 978-2890170179. Translated by Henri Dominique Paratte into English as "A Scream Not to Die of Shame" in Poésie acadienne contemporaine — Acadian Poetry Now. Moncton/Charlottetown: Éditions Perce-Neige/Ragweed Press, P.E.I., 1985.
- 1992: Les Yeux de Natania: poésie par Gérard Étienne ("The eyes of Natania"). Muse en île 3 (April 1992): pp. 1–2.
- 1993: La Charte des crépuscules: Œuvres poétiques 1960–1980 ("Twilight charter"). Moncton: Éditions d'Acadie. ISBN 978-2760002333.
- 1994: Embargo in Sapriphage, "Présence d'Haïti" issue 22 (summer-fall 1994): pp. 47–49.
- 2008: Natania. Montreal: Éditions du Marais. ISBN 978-2923721019.

=== Essays ===
- 1962: Essai sur la négritude ("On Blackness"). Port-au-Prince: Éditions Panorama.
- 1964: Le Nationalisme dans la littérature haïtienne (Nationalism in Haitian literature). Éditions Lycée Pétion-Ville.
- 1978: La vie et l'œuvre de Franck Fouché ("The life and work of Franck Fouché"). Présence Francophone 16 (spring 1978: pp. 191–99.
- 1985: Le vaudou centrons le ballon selon les règles du jeu ("Vodun — let's centre the ball according to the rules of the game"). Haïti-Progrès (13–19 February 1985): pp. 11–18.
- 1995: La Question raciale et raciste dans le roman québécois ("The racial and racist question in Quebec novels"). Montréal: Éditions Balzac. ISBN 978-2921425520.
- 1998: La Femme noire dans le discours littéraire haïtien ("Black women in Haitian literary discourse"), written with François Soeler. Montréal/Paris: Éditions Balzac/Le Griot. ISBN 978-2921468091.
- 1998: L'Injustice, la désinformation, le mépris de la loi ("Injustice, misinformation, disregard of the law"). Montreal: Humanitas. ISBN 978-2893961651.
- 2006: Le peintre Hervé Lebreton et la poétique de la femme ("The artist Hervé Lebreton and the poetics of women "). Miami: ÉducaVision. ASIN: B00DYRTQY2.
- 2009: Le Créole, Une Langue ("Haitian Creole, a language"). Montreal: Éditions du Marais. ISBN 978-2923721101
