= Errol Étienne =

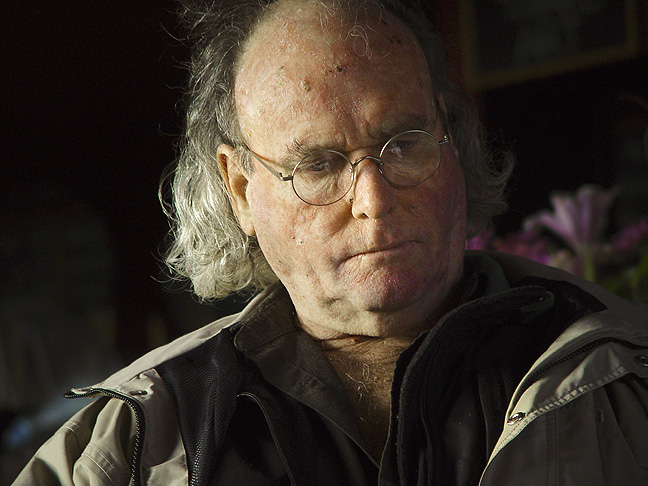
Errol Étienne

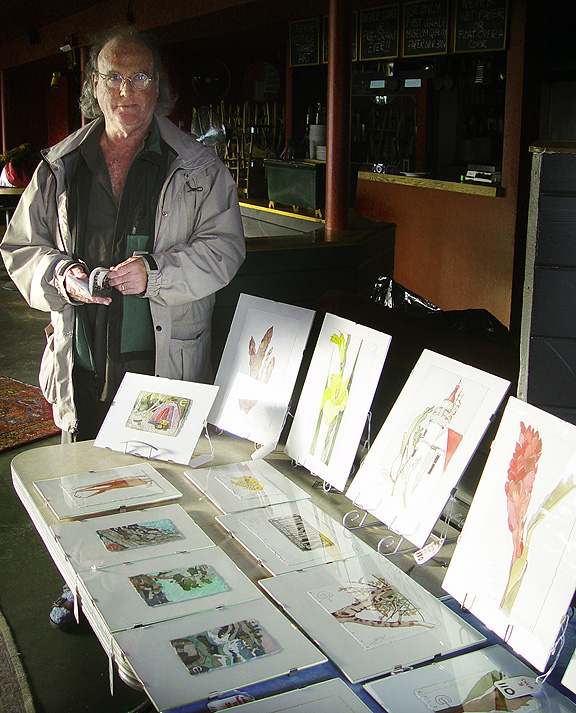
Errol Etienne at his opening show at the South Beach House Gallery in Point Roberts Washington U.S.A. in December 2004.

Errol Herbert Russel Étienne (1941–2011) was an artist in many media including watercolor, oil and acrylic painting. His watercolors can be found in museums, travelling exhibitions as well as in private collections. Much of his bright and animated work was inspired by his time living in the Florida Keys.

Étienne was born in Edinburgh, Scotland in 1941, but spent most of his childhood in Quebec province, Canada. At the age of 27, in 1978, he graduated from the Art Center College of Design in Los Angeles, California. He was also elected Senior Academician of the Royal Canadian Academy. He has exhibited his work in many cities from around the world including Paris, London, Sydney and New York. His work in animation includes design, editing and production of an IMAX production featuring of some of his paintings. He won an Emmy in Australia for animation. Errol was profiled in the January/February 1980 issue of Communication Arts magazine. The article covered his graphic design work while in Vancouver, B.C. Canada, where he did business under the name of the "Frog and Bison" "Frog" being a reference to his years in Montreal, Quebec, and "Bison" for a former associate in Montana. At that time Errol also operated a studio/gallery, the "Frog and Swan" with artist/calligrapher Robin Arkell. Errol is noted for his no-compromise professionalism, as expressed in this quotation from the Communication Arts magazine: "I don't let people make changes in my work because it's so personal. I know production and what the job needs, and the only thing that's important is the end product. How you get to that is the problem because the only standard is that it must be excellent. There is really is no excuse for a mediocre final product."

While he worked in numerous mediums, his work as a water colorist was considered world-class. During the last 20 years of his life, his technique never varied. Subject matter was drawn primarily from his visual interpretation of nature (fish, flowers and panoramas) using bold colors. Watercolors were created exclusively on two papers: Arches moldmade in France and Khadi handmade in India. He believed those two papers best displayed the positive optimism of his subject matter. He would initially draw his subject with one of two instruments: a Mout Blanc pen given to him by his father as a teenager or a common wide pencil employed in the construction industry.

Once subject matter was drawn he would hand mix the colors he thought appropriate for an individual work. The technique that made his work most distinctive was the exclusive use of hand made Windsor Newton squirrel hair brushes which he would curl at the end to create different size strokes with the same brush. He also believed that a single stroke of color was the truest reflection of the artist. None of his watercolors have the overlapping use of color. He coined the phrase "singlelapping" to describe his unique technique. While impossible to estimate precisely, by the artists own estimate he created over 8,000 works of original art.
