= Charles Estienne =

French anatomist (1504–1564)

Charles Estienne (French: [ʃaʁl etjɛn]; 1504–1564), known as Carolus Stephanus in Latin and Charles Stephens in English, was an early exponent of the science of anatomy in France. Charles was a younger brother of Robert Estienne I, the famous printer, and son to Henri, who Latinized the family name as Stephanus. He married Geneviève de Berly.

After the usual humanistic training he studied medicine, and took his doctor's degree at Paris. He was for a time tutor to Jean-Antoine de Baïf, the future poet. It is uncertain whether he taught publicly. His career was interrupted by the oppressive persecutions in which their religious opinions involved the family.

Éstienne, though from a family whose classical taste was their principal glory, did not betray the same servile imitation of the Galenian anatomy as his contemporary, Jacques Dubois. He appears to have been the first to detect valves in the orifice of the hepatic veins, though his description was vague. He was ignorant, however, of the researches of the Italian anatomists; and his description of the brain is inferior to that given sixty years before by Alessandro Achillini. His comparison of the cerebral cavities to the human ear has persuaded F. Portal that he knew the inferior cornua, the hippocampus and its prolongations; but this is no reason for giving him that honour to the detriment of the reputation of Achillini, to whom, so far as historical testimony goes, the first knowledge of this fact is due.

The researches of Éstienne into the structure of the nervous system are, however, neither useless nor inglorious; and the circumstance of demonstrating a canal through the entire length of the spinal cord, which had neither been suspected by contemporaries nor noticed by successors till Jean-Baptiste de Sénac (1693–1770) made it known, is sufficient to place him high in the rank of anatomical discoverers.

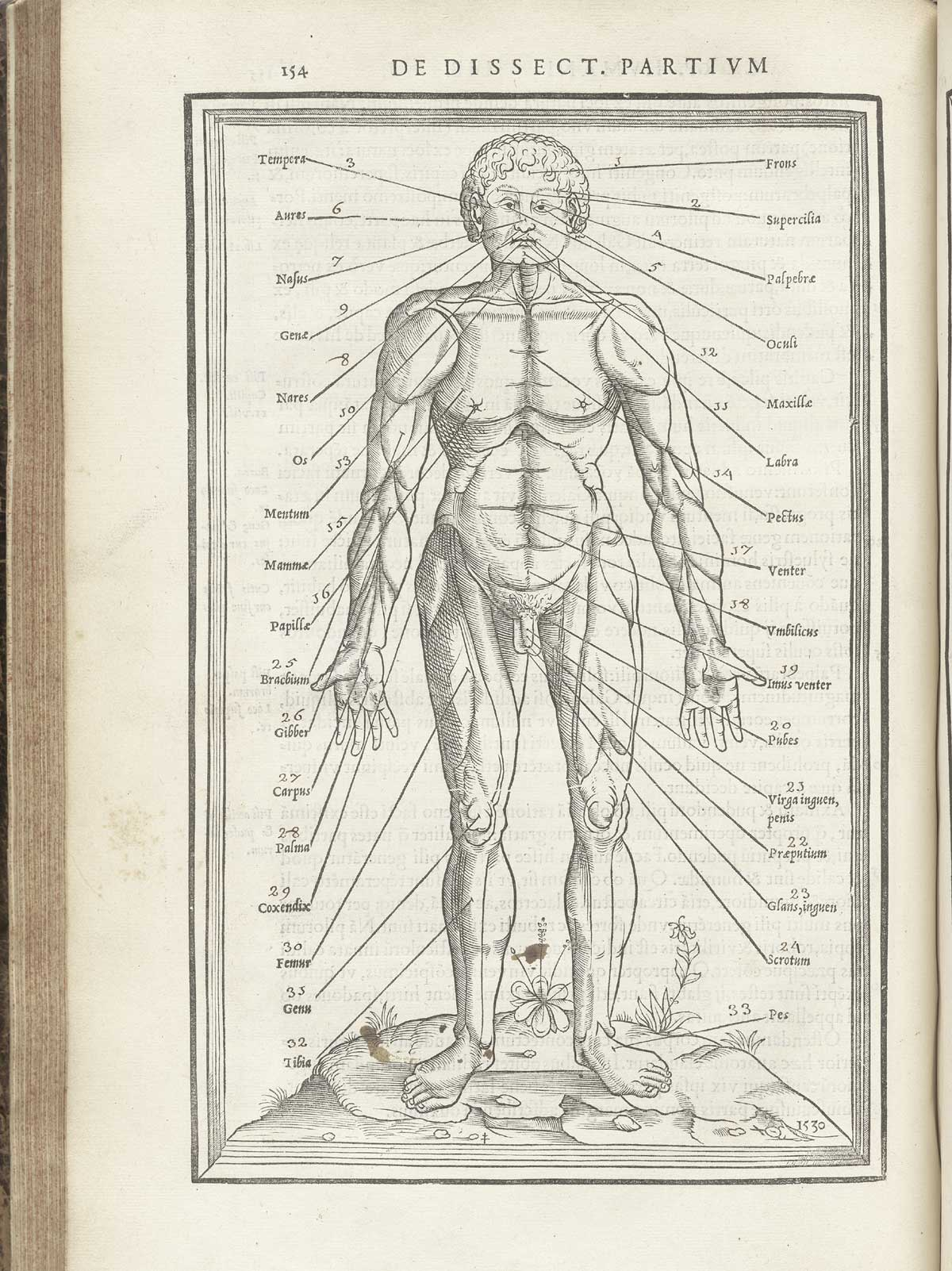
From Charles Estienne's De dissectione partium corporis humani libri tres (Paris, 1545).

In 1551, when Robert Estienne left Paris for Geneva, Charles, who had remained a Catholic, took charge of his printing establishment, and in the same year was appointed king's printer. In 1561 he became bankrupt, and he is said to have died in a debtors' prison.

His principal works are:

- Praedium Rusticum (1554), a collection of tracts which he had compiled from ancient writers on various branches of agriculture, and which continued to be a favorite book down to the end of the 17th century
- Dictionarium historicum ad poeticum (1553), the first French encyclopedia
- Thesaurus Ciceronianus (1557)
- De dissectione partium corporis humani libri tres, with well-drawn woodcuts (1545)

He also published a translation of an Italian comedy, Gli Ingannati, under the title of Le Sacrifice (1543; republished as Les Abus, 1549), which had some influence on the development of French comedy; and Paradoxes (1553), an imitation of the Paradossi of Ortensio Landi.

His daughter Nicole Estienne became a prolific poet.

== Works ==
- Sylua : Frutetum; Collis . F. Stephanus, Parisiis 1538 Digital edition by the University and State Library Düsseldorf
- L' agriculture et maison rustique as the German TranslationSiben Bücher Von dem Feldbau, und vollkommener bestellung eynes ordentlichen Mayerhofs oder Landguts, Strassburg 1580, doi:10.3931/e-rara-86649 (Digitized Edition at E-rara).
