= Hôtel de Ville, Malakoff =

Town hall in Malakoff, France

Hôtel de Ville
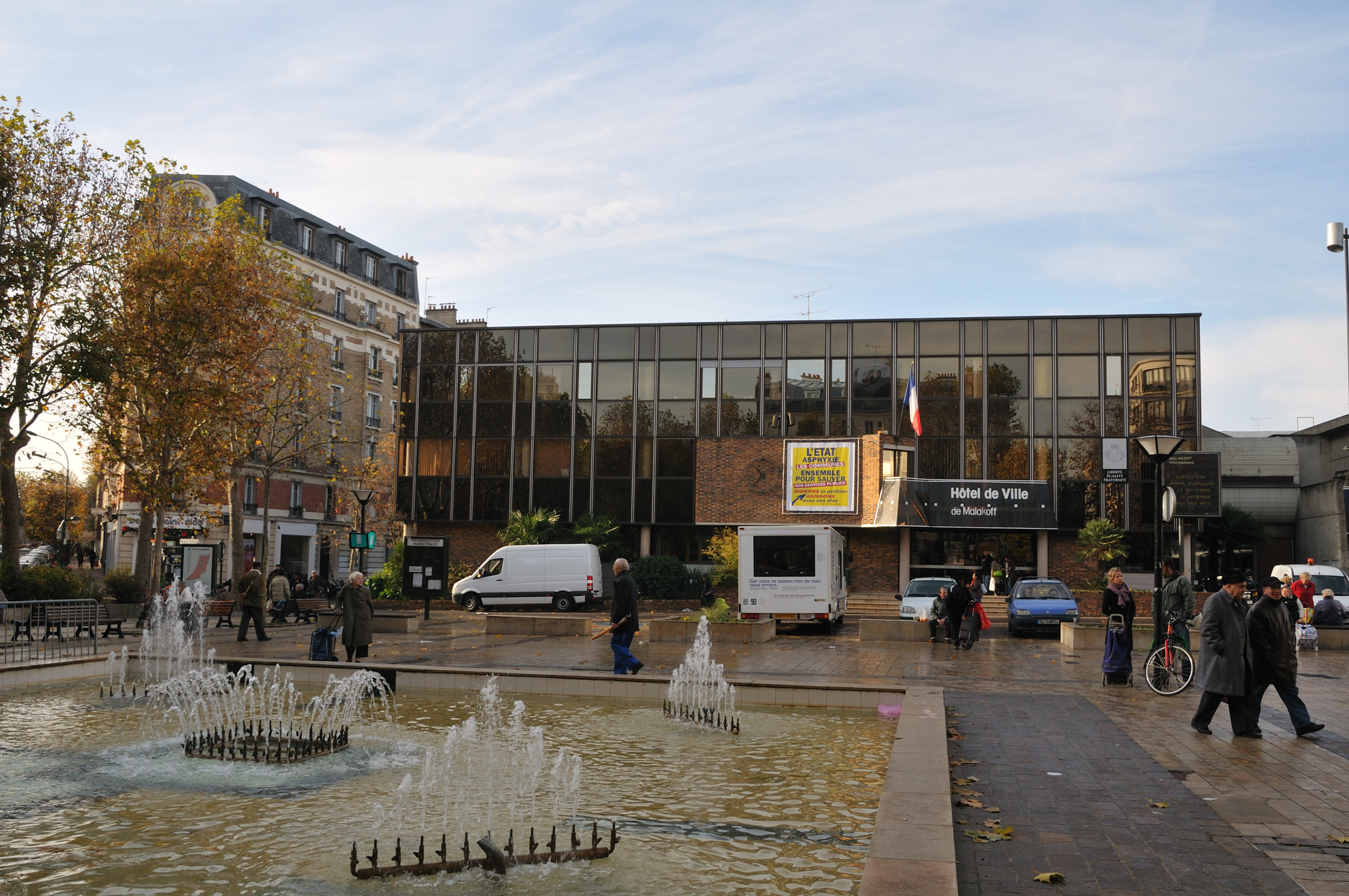
- The main frontage of the Hôtel de Ville in November 2009
- Interactive map of the Hôtel de Ville area

General information
- Type: City hall
- Architectural style: Modern style
- Location: Malakoff, France
- Coordinates: 48.8208°N 2.3016°E
- Completed: 1976

The Hôtel de Ville (French pronunciation: [otɛl də vil], City Hall) is a municipal building in Malakoff, Hauts-de-Seine, in the southwestern suburbs of Paris, standing on Place du 11 Novembre 1918.

== History ==
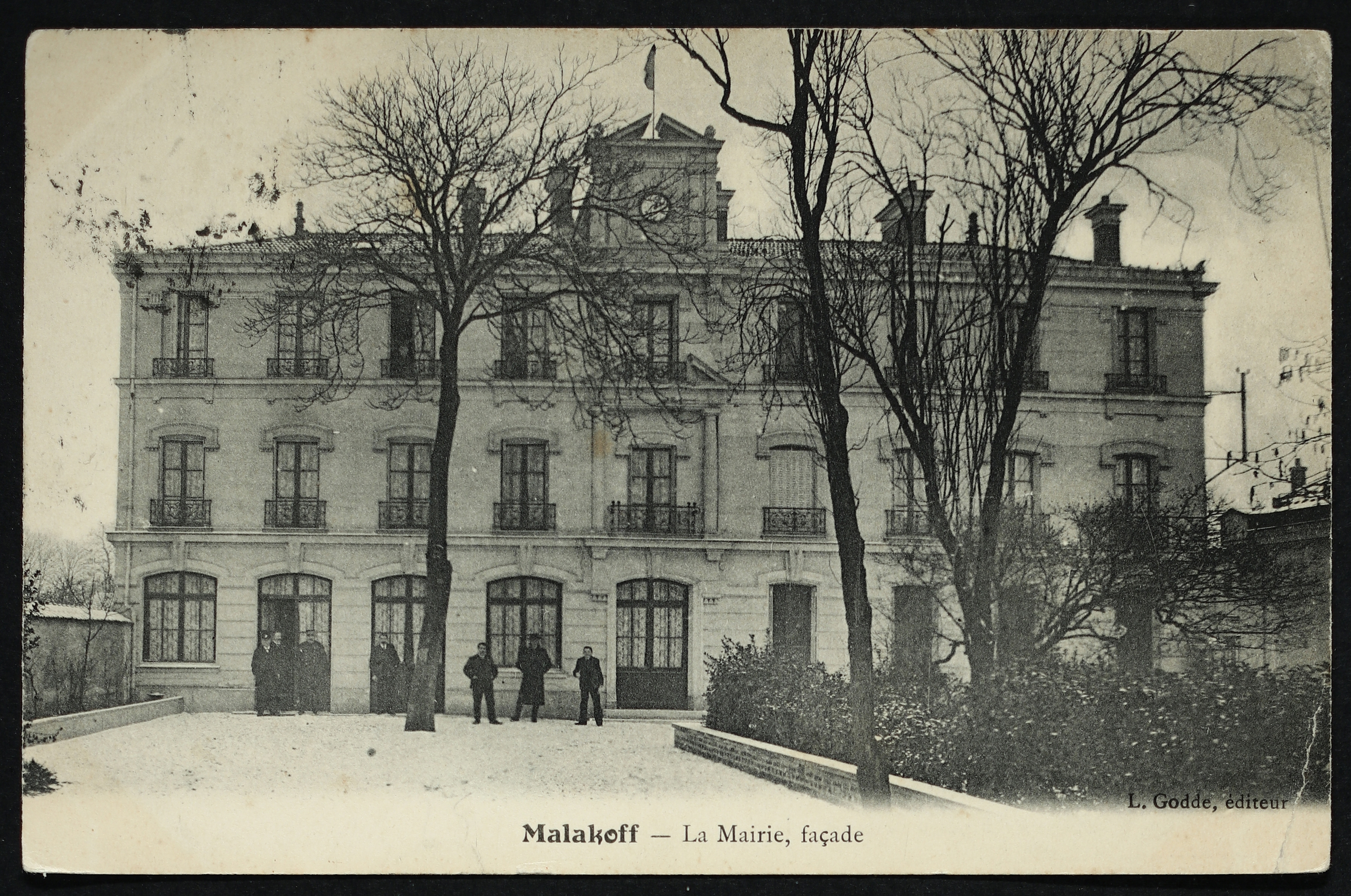
The first town hall

Following implementation of the decision to detach part of the commune of Vanves to create the new commune of Malakoff in November 1883, the new town council initially met in the playground of the local school. This arrangement continued until April 1884, when the council led by the mayor, Eugène-Amédée Féburier, signed a lease on two buildings on Rue du Camps Français (now Rue Victor-Hugo), both of which had been erected in 1870.

The two houses were of similar design, each of four bays, with a connecting bay surmounted by a gable between them. In the early 20th century, the connecting bay was remodelled with a new segmental headed doorway on the ground floor, a French door and a balcony flanked by a pair of Doric order columns on the first floor, a casement window on the second floor, and a clock above, instead of the gable. The other bays were fenestrated by segmental headed windows on the ground floor and the first floor, and by casement windows on the second floor. There was a parapet at roof level and the pitched roofs of the two houses were replaced by a single roofline.

During the Second World War, in response to general disorder, the town hall was seized by elements of the French Forces of the Interior on 19 August 1944. This was a week before the official liberation of the town by the French 2nd Armoured Division, commanded by General Philippe Leclerc, on 26 August 1944. In the early years of the 21st century, the old town hall was largely demolished, and replaced by the new Maison de la Vie Associative et des Syndicats (House of Community Life and Trade Unions), which was officially opened on 26 October 2006.

Following a significant increase in population, in the early 1970s, the council led by the mayor, Léo Figuères, decided to commission a modern town hall. The site they selected was the southwest side of what is now Place du 11 Novembre 1918. The town hall formed part of a complex of municipal buildings with a theatre to the northwest and a médiathèque (multi-media library) behind. The new town hall was designed in the modern style, built in concrete and glass and was completed in 1976.

The design involved an asymmetrical main frontage of six bays facing into Place du 11 Novembre 1918. On the ground floor, the bays were faced with brick and separated by concrete columns supporting the upper floors of the structure, which were faced by alternating rows of dark cladding and dark-framed windows. There was a short flight of steps leading to a recessed doorway in the second bay on the right. Internally, the principal room was the Salle du Conseil (council chamber).

In September 2025, the town hall attracted national media attention after the council led by the mayor, Jacqueline Belhomme, decided that the Palestinian flag should be raised on the façade of the building in anticipation of France's recognition of the State of Palestine. Following a direction from Minister of the Interior, a local tribunal ordered the council to remove the flag, but the council refused to comply for several days.
