= Malakoff–Plateau de Vanves station =

Metro station in Paris, France

Malakoff–Plateau de Vanves
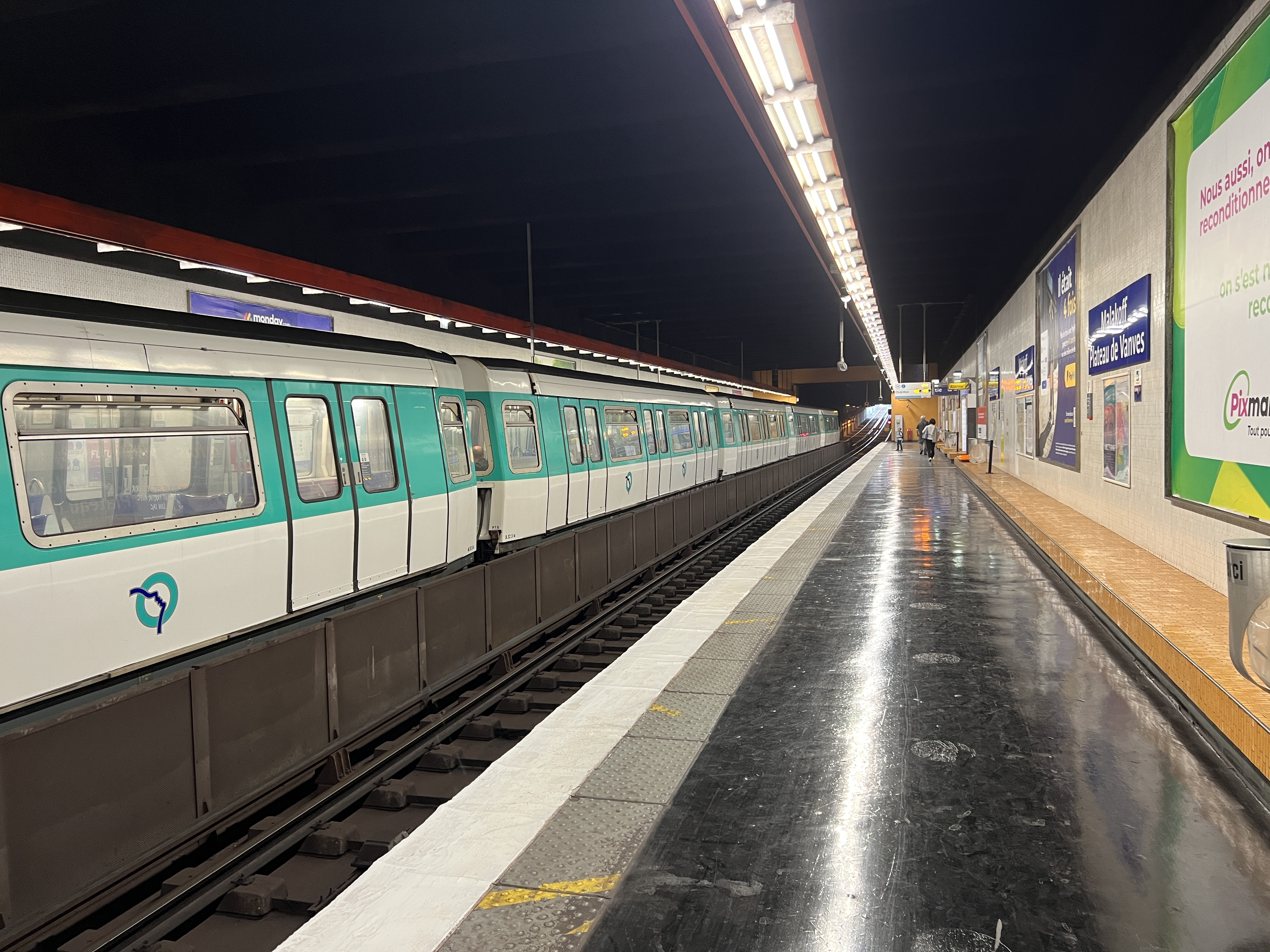
- MF 77 at Malakoff–Plateau de Vanves

General information
- Location: Malakoff; Île-de-France; France
- Coordinates: 48°49′22″N 2°17′54″E
- System: Paris Métro station
- Owner: RATP
- Operator: RATP
- Line: Paris Metro Paris Metro Line 13
- Platforms: 2 (2 side platforms)
- Tracks: 2

Construction
- Accessible: no

Other information
- Station code: 27-07
- Fare zone: 1

History
- Opened: 9 November 1976

Passengers
- 2,242,320 (2021)

Services
Preceding station	Paris Metro	Following station
Malakoff–Rue Étienne Dolet towards Châtillon–Montrouge	Line 13	Porte de Vanves towards Les Courtilles or Saint-Denis–Université
Location
- Location within Paris

Malakoff–Plateau de Vanves (French pronunciation: [malakɔf plato d(ə) vɑ̃v]) is an underground station on Line 13 of the Paris Métro in the commune of Malakoff. It is the last underground station on the line towards Châtillon-Montrouge.

The station takes its name from its location on the border of the communes of Malakoff and Vanves as well as the Plateau de Vanves district, located in the northern part of the commune of Vanves, 60 metres above sea level.

== History ==
The station opened on 9 November 1976 as part of the extension of line 13 from Porte de Vanves to Châtillon–Montrouge, on the same day the old line 14 was incorporated into line 13 following the latter's extension in successive phases from Saint-Lazare.

As part of the "Un métro + beau" programme by the RATP, the station's corridors were renovated and modernised on 17 December 2005.

In 2019, the station was used by 3,454,231 passengers, making it the 139th busiest of the Métro network out of 302 stations.

In 2020, the station was used by 1,581,749 passengers amidst the COVID-19 pandemic, making it the 163rd busiest of the Métro network out of 304 stations.

In 2021, the station was used by 2,242,320 passengers, making it the 155th busiest of the Métro network out of 304 stations.

== Passenger services ==
=== Access ===
The station has two accesses within the same surface building:

- Access 1: rue Jean Bleuzen (Vanves)
- Access 2: Boulevard Charles de Gaulle (Malakoff)

=== Station layout ===
Street Level
B1	Mezzanine
Platform level	Side platform, doors will open on the right
Platform level	Northbound	← toward Les Courtilles or Saint-Denis–Université (Porte de Vanves)
Platform level	Southbound	toward Châtillon – Montrouge (Malakoff–Rue Étienne Dolet) →
Platform level	Side platform, doors will open on the right

=== Platforms ===
The station has a standard configuration with 2 tracks surrounded by 2 side platforms. The side walls are vertical with a horizontal ceiling, typical of the métro stations built in the suburbs from 1970 to 1985. The two tracks are separated by an anti-crossing barrier in the middle.

=== Other connections ===
The station is also served by lines 58 and 59 of the RATP bus network, and at night, by line N63 of the Noctilien bus network.

== Nearby ==
- Cimetière de Vanves
- Square Eugène-Christophe
- Théâtre 71
- Promenade départementale des Vallons-de-la-Bièvre

== Gallery ==
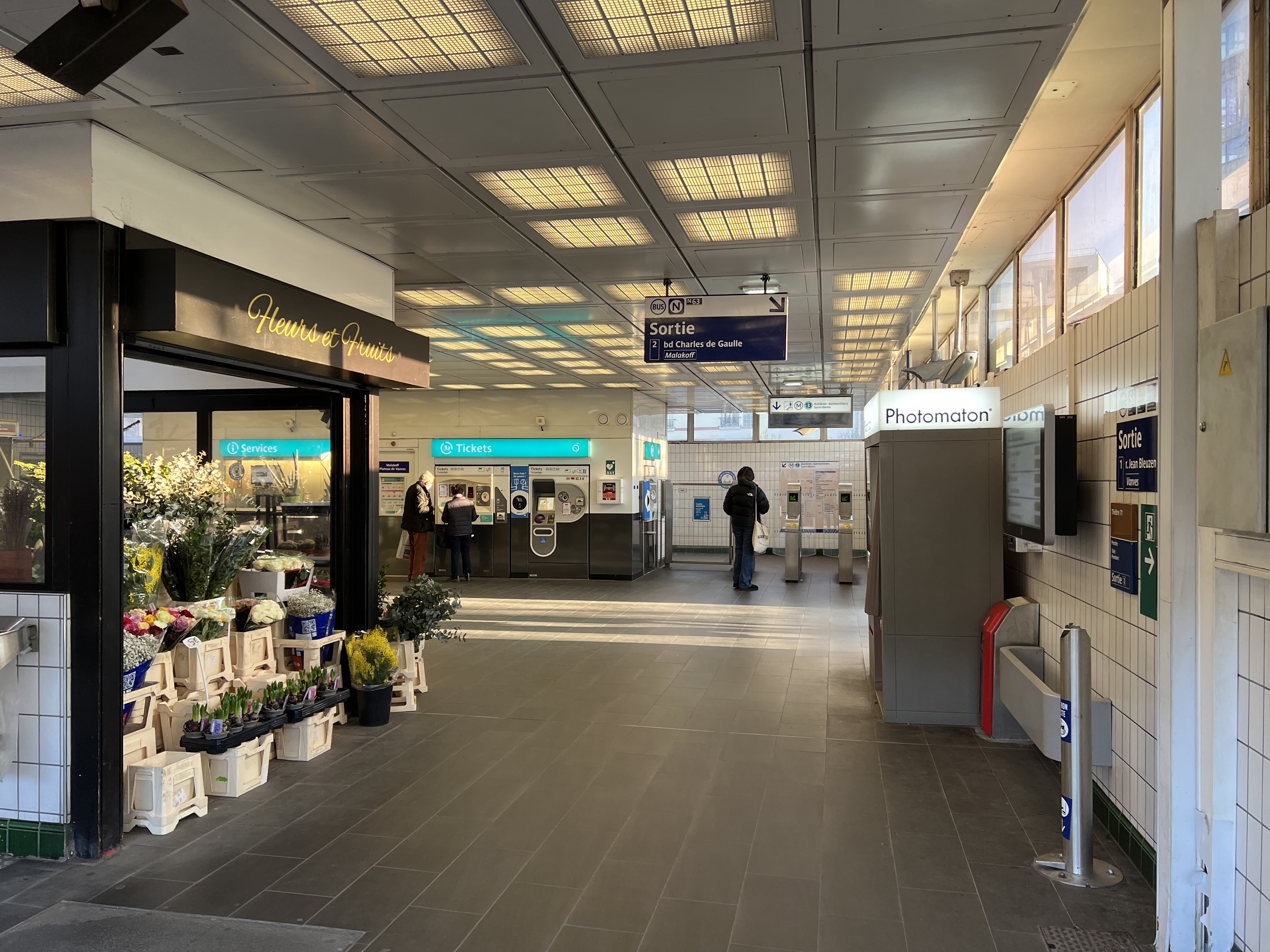
Inside the access building

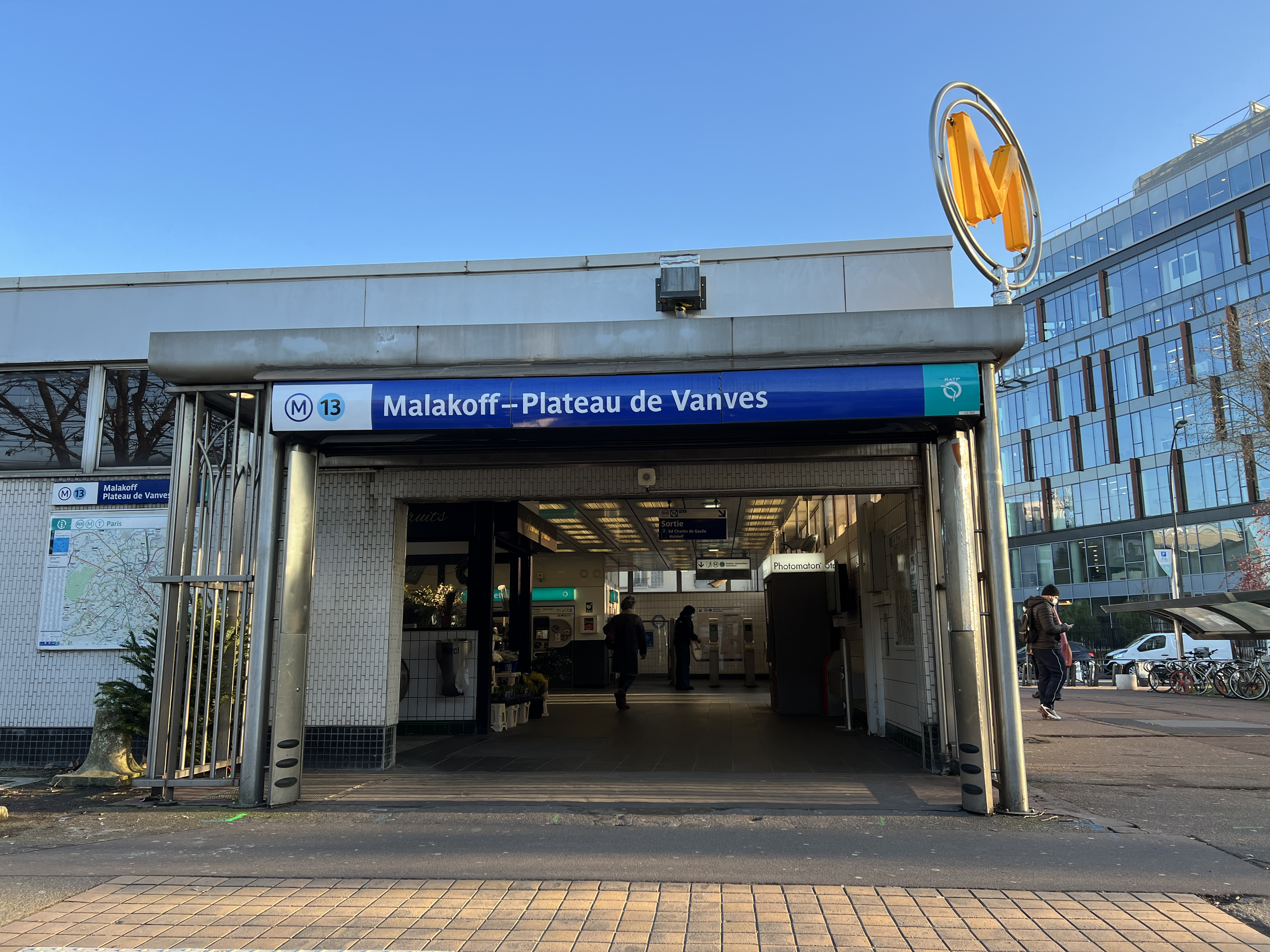
Access 1

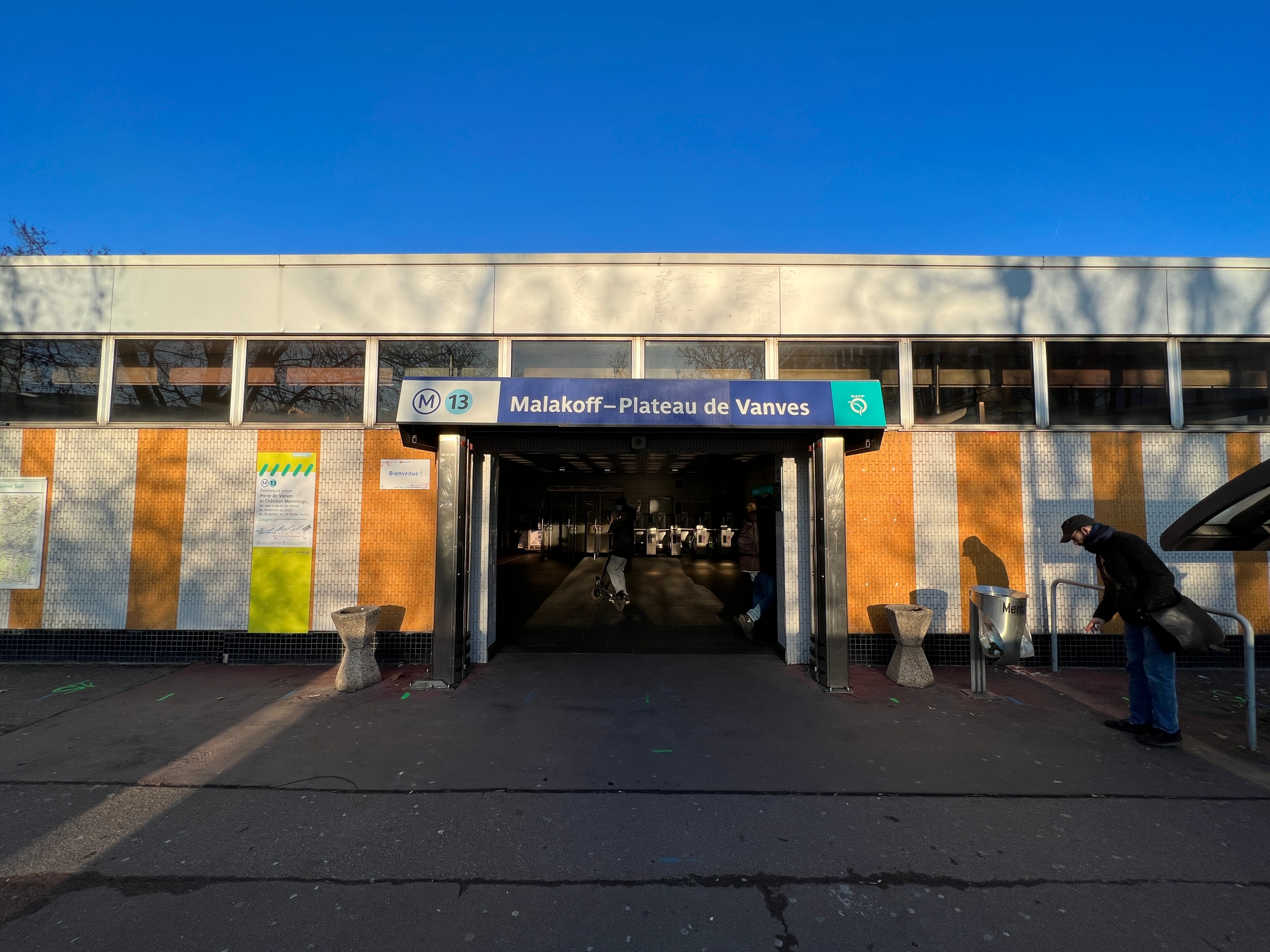
Access 2
