= Viroflay =

- Commune
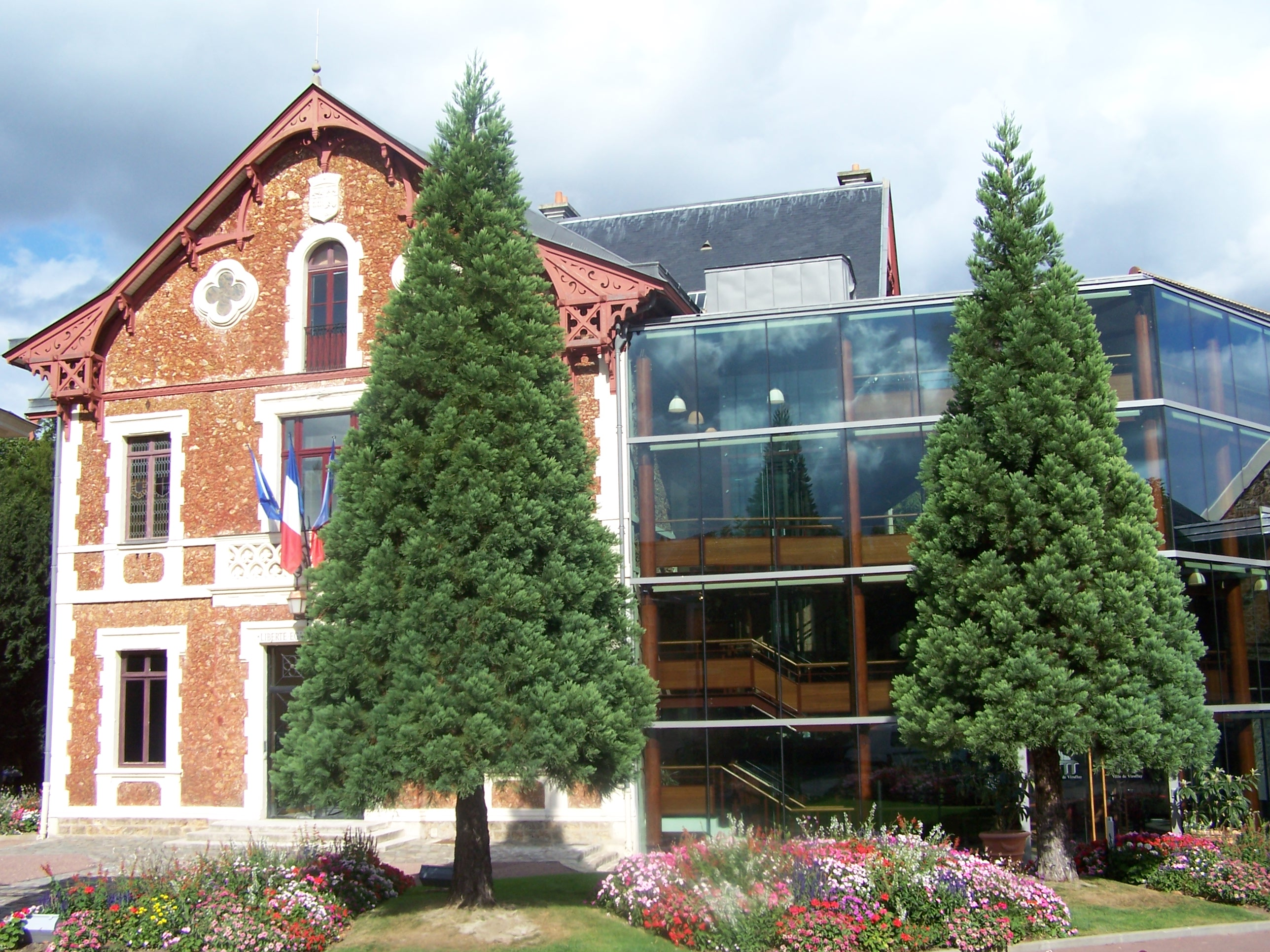
- The town hall in Viroflay

- Coat of arms

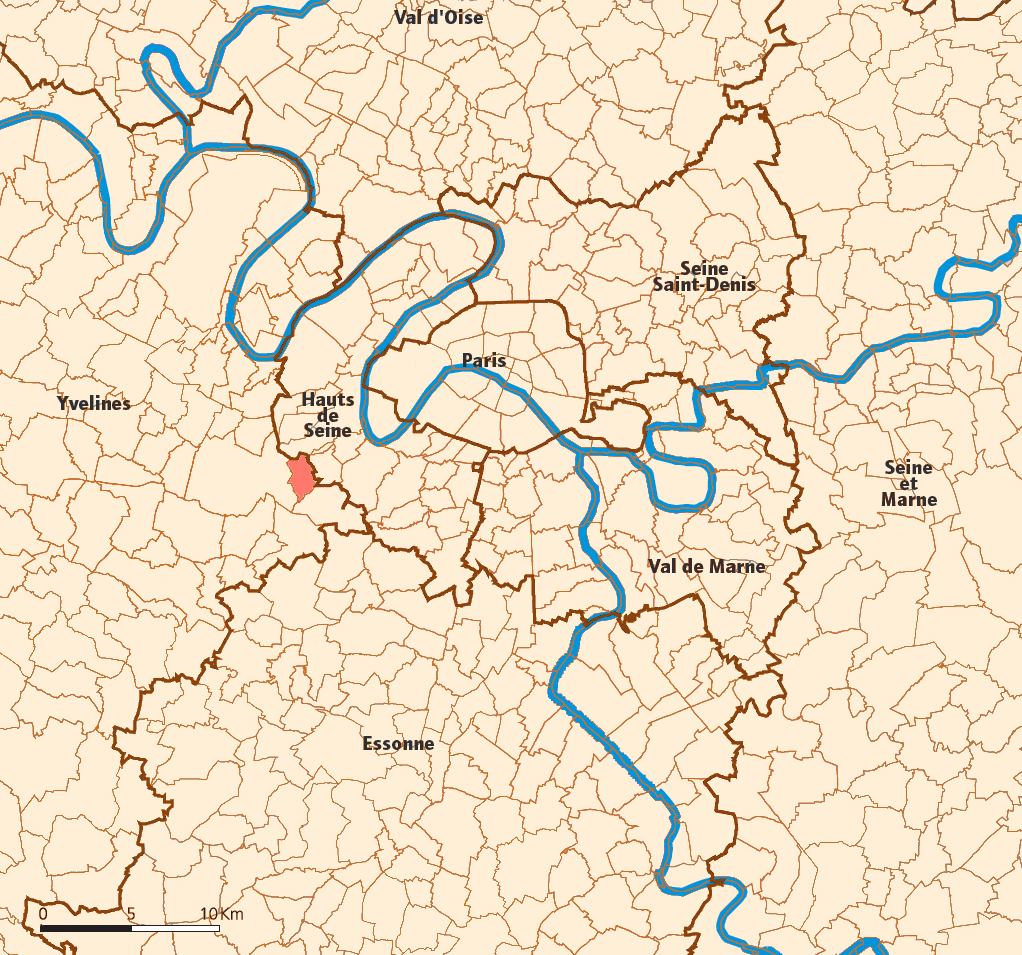
- Location (in red) within Paris inner and outer suburbs
- Location of Viroflay
- Location within France Location within Île-de-France (region)
- Coordinates: 48°48′00″N 2°10′01″E
- Country: France
- Region: Île-de-France
- Department: Yvelines
- Arrondissement: Versailles
- Canton: Versailles-2
- Intercommunality: CA Versailles Grand Parc

Government
  - Mayor (2026–32): Olivier Lebrun
- Area^{1}: 3.49 km^{2} (1.35 sq mi)
- Highest elevation: 176 m (577 ft)
- Lowest elevation: 92 m (302 ft)
- Population (2023): 17,237
  - Density: 4,940/km^{2} (12,800/sq mi)
- Time zone: UTC+01:00 (CET)
  - Summer (DST): UTC+02:00 (CEST)
- INSEE/Postal code: 78686 /78220
- Website: ville-viroflay.fr
- ^{1} French Land Register data, which excludes lakes, ponds, glaciers > 1 km^{2} (0.386 sq mi or 247 acres) and river estuaries.

Viroflay (French pronunciation: [viʁɔflɛ]) is a commune in the Yvelines department in the Île-de-France in north-central France. It is located in the south-western suburbs of Paris 14.1 km (8.8 mi) from the center and 3 km (1.9 mi) from the Palace of Versailles.

The town motto is Lux mea lex which is Latin for "Light is my law".

== Population ==
Historical population
Year	Pop.	±% p.a.
1968	16,352	—
1975	15,696	−0.58%
1982	14,074	−1.55%
1990	14,689	+0.54%
1999	15,211	+0.39%
2007	16,000	+0.63%
2012	15,678	−0.41%
2017	16,129	+0.57%
2023	17,237	+1.11%
Source: INSEE

== Gastronomy ==
The "Viroflay Omelette" is an omelette stuffed with spinach, ham and gruyère cheese.
The "Monstruous" is a variety of spinach, specific to Viroflay where it used to be cultivated.

== Transport ==
Viroflay is served by Viroflay-Rive-Gauche station, which is an interchange station on Paris RER line C and on the Transilien Paris-Montparnasse suburban rail line.

It is also served by Viroflay-Rive-Droite station on the Transilien Paris-Saint-Lazare suburban rail line and by Chaville–Vélizy station on Paris RER line C.

== See also ==
- Communes of the Yvelines department
