= Léo Figuères =

French politician (1918–2011)

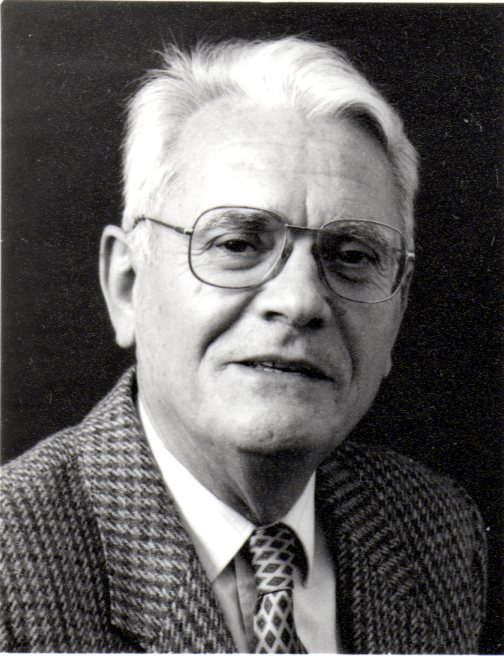
- Figuères in 1990

Mayor of Malakoff
- In office March 1965 – September 1996
- Preceded by: Léon Salagnac
- Succeeded by: Catherine Margaté

Personal details
- Born: Léopold Figuères; 27 March 1918 Perpignan, France
- Died: 1 August 2012 (aged 94) Perpignan, France
- Party: PCF
- Education: International Lenin School
- Profession: Journalist, writer

Léopold "Léo" Figuères (27 March 1918 – 1 August 2011) was a French politician and publicist belonging to the French Communist Party. A prominent member of the French Resistance, he was mayor of Malakoff from 1965 until his retirement in 1993.

== Biography ==
=== Early life and career ===
Figuères was born in Perpignan on into a family of farmers. His family moved to Prades in 1922, where his father had found work. After completing primary school and secondary school in Prades, he trained as a typographer from 1933 to 1935 and then worked in this profession in Perpignan. Although he grew up in a rather conservative family, reading L'Humanité made an impression on him and at the early age of 14, he joined the Mouvement Jeunes Communistes de France in 1932, then the French Communist Party in 1935. From 1935 to 1937 he attended the International Lenin School in Moscow. On his return to France, he was one of the founders of L'Union de la Jeunesse Agricole de France (UJAF) (roughly: Union of French Agricultural Youth) and helped form the French Volunteer Battalions of the International Brigades for the Spanish Civil War. In 1938 he was drafted into the French army in Corsica.

=== World War II, Vietnam and Algeria ===
He immediately joined the French resistance after the establishment of the Vichy regime. In 1941 he met his future wife, Lea Lamoureux, who, like him, was a member of the resistance. By decision of October 10, 1944, he was sent to the Consultative Assembly along with Pierre Gauthier as one of the six delegates of the United Forces of Patriotic Youth (FUJP). After the liberation in 1946 he became general secretary of the Union of Young People of Republican France (UJRF), in which other communist youth organizations from the Resistance were also represented.

During the Indochina War he was director of the newspaper of the Avant-gard of the UJRF Communist Youth and went to Vietnam in 1950 as a journalist. He met the leaders of the Democratic Republic of Vietnam including Ho Chi Minh. He published stories and a book on the colonial war in which he called for the war to end and those responsible to be brought to justice. Towards the end of the war in Algeria, he took part as a leader in the demonstration against the Organization armée secrète (OAS) in Paris on February 8, 1962. He was severely beaten by the police during a demonstration at the Charonne metro station.

=== Later life ===
Figuères was a national leader of the French Communist Party and a member of its Central Committee and at its secretariat from 1959 to 1964, responsible for work with intellectuals, he created the Center for Marxist Studies and Research (CERM), he was also director of the theoretical journal of the PCF, the Cahiers du communisme until 1976.

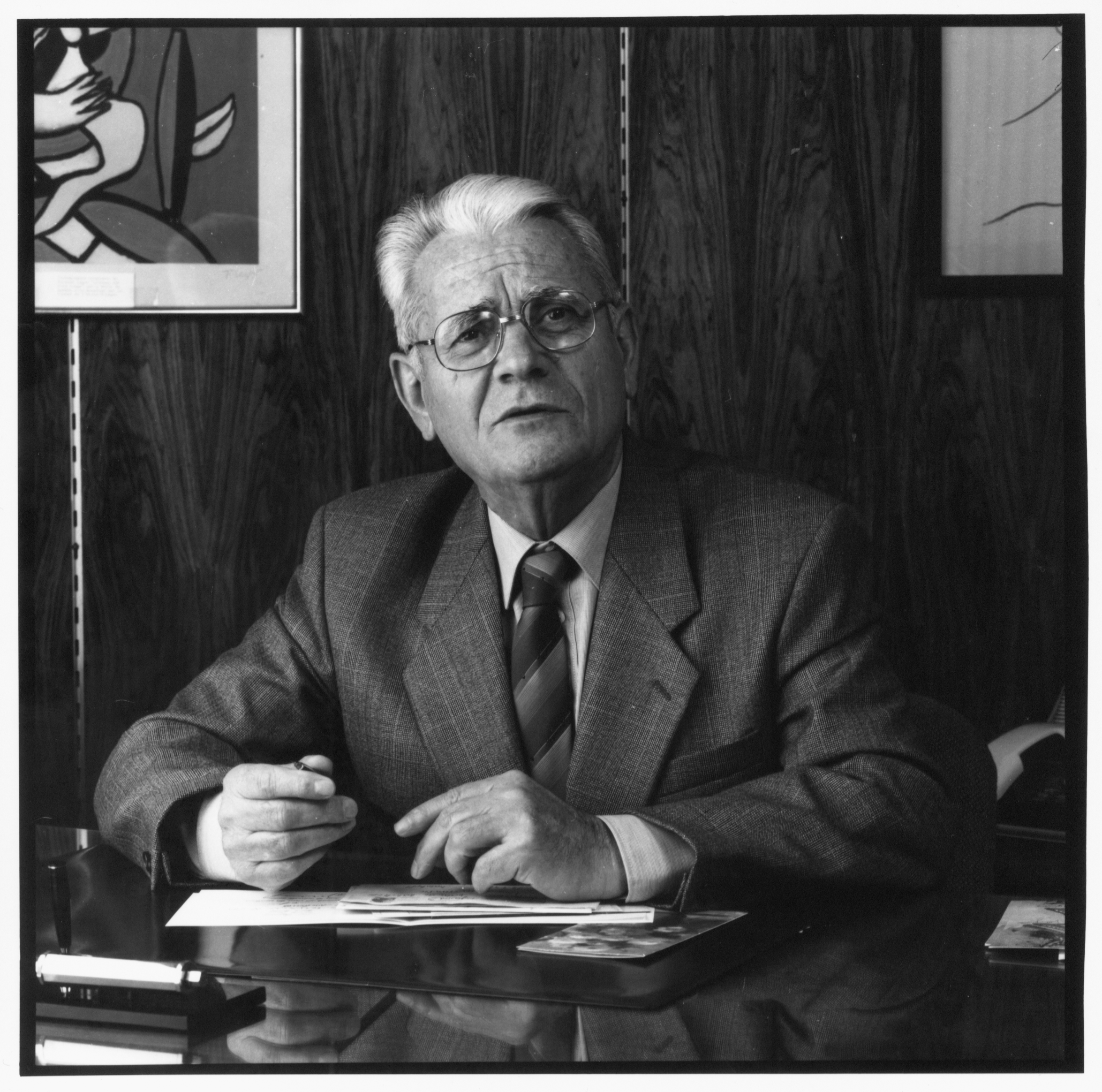
Figuères at the town hall of Malakoff, 1992

He was elected General Councilor of the Seine and then of the Hauts-de-Seine between 1959 and 1993. Mayor of Malakoff from 1965 until his departure and his replacement by Catherine Margaté in 1996, he had been Honorary Mayor since then.

Léo Figuères died in Perpignan aged 92. He was buried at Los Masos.

== Awards ==
- Resistance Medal and Cross of the Resistance Volunteer Combatant
- Knight of the Legion of Honor, September 23, 1983
- Knight of the Ordre des Arts et des Lettres, September 16, 1985.
