= Hôtel de Ville, Vanves =

Town hall in Vanves, France

Hôtel de Ville
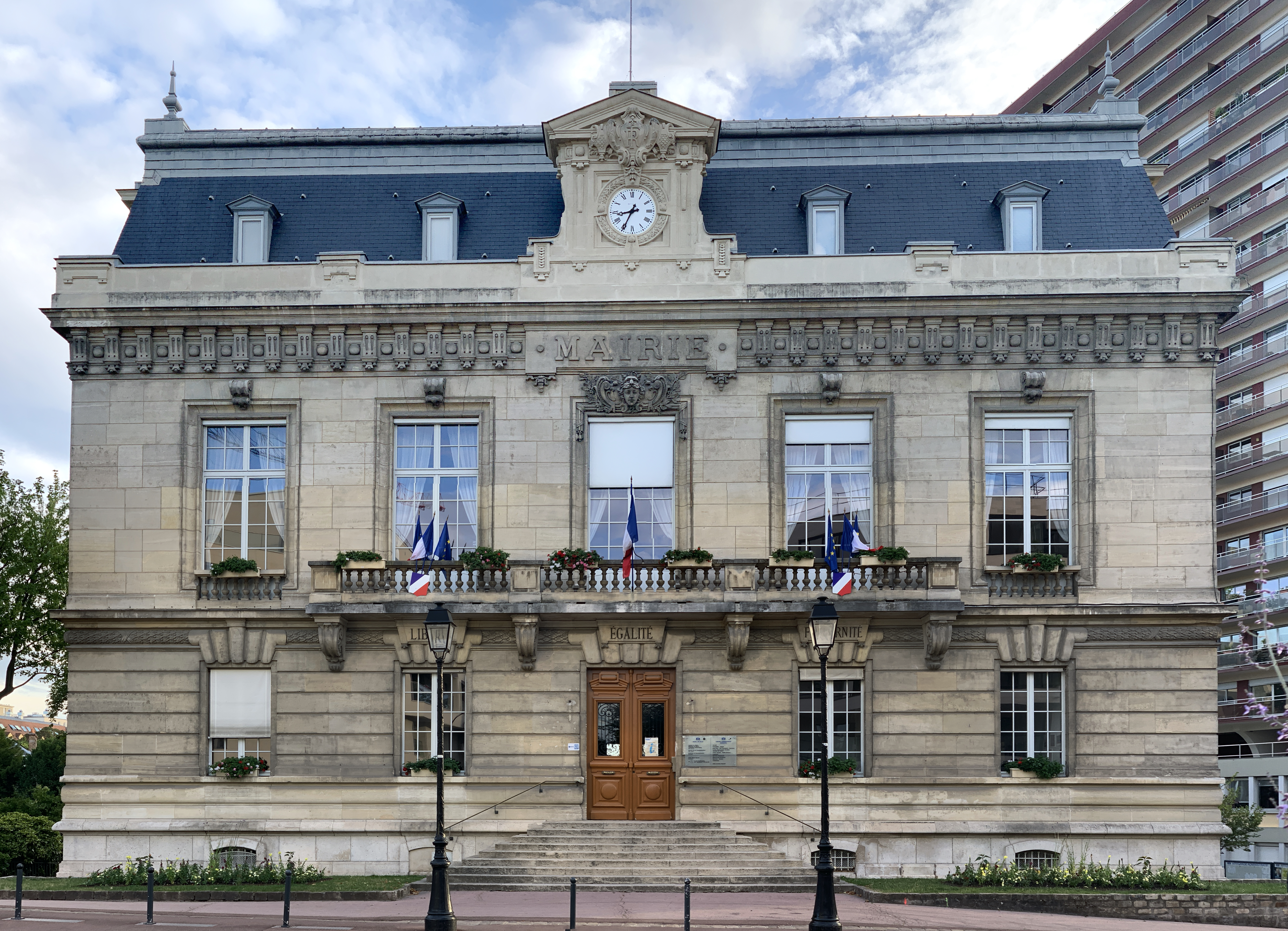
- The main frontage of the Hôtel de Ville in June 2020

General information
- Type: City hall
- Architectural style: Neoclassical style
- Location: Vanves, France
- Coordinates: 48.8214°N 2.2895°E
- Completed: 1898

Design and construction
- Architects: Camille Morel and Emile Lecamp

The Hôtel de Ville (French pronunciation: [otɛl də vil], City Hall) is a municipal building in Vanves, Hauts-de-Seine, in the southwestern suburbs of Paris, standing on Rue Mary Besseyre. It has been included on the Inventaire général des monuments by the French Ministry of Culture since 1989.

== History ==
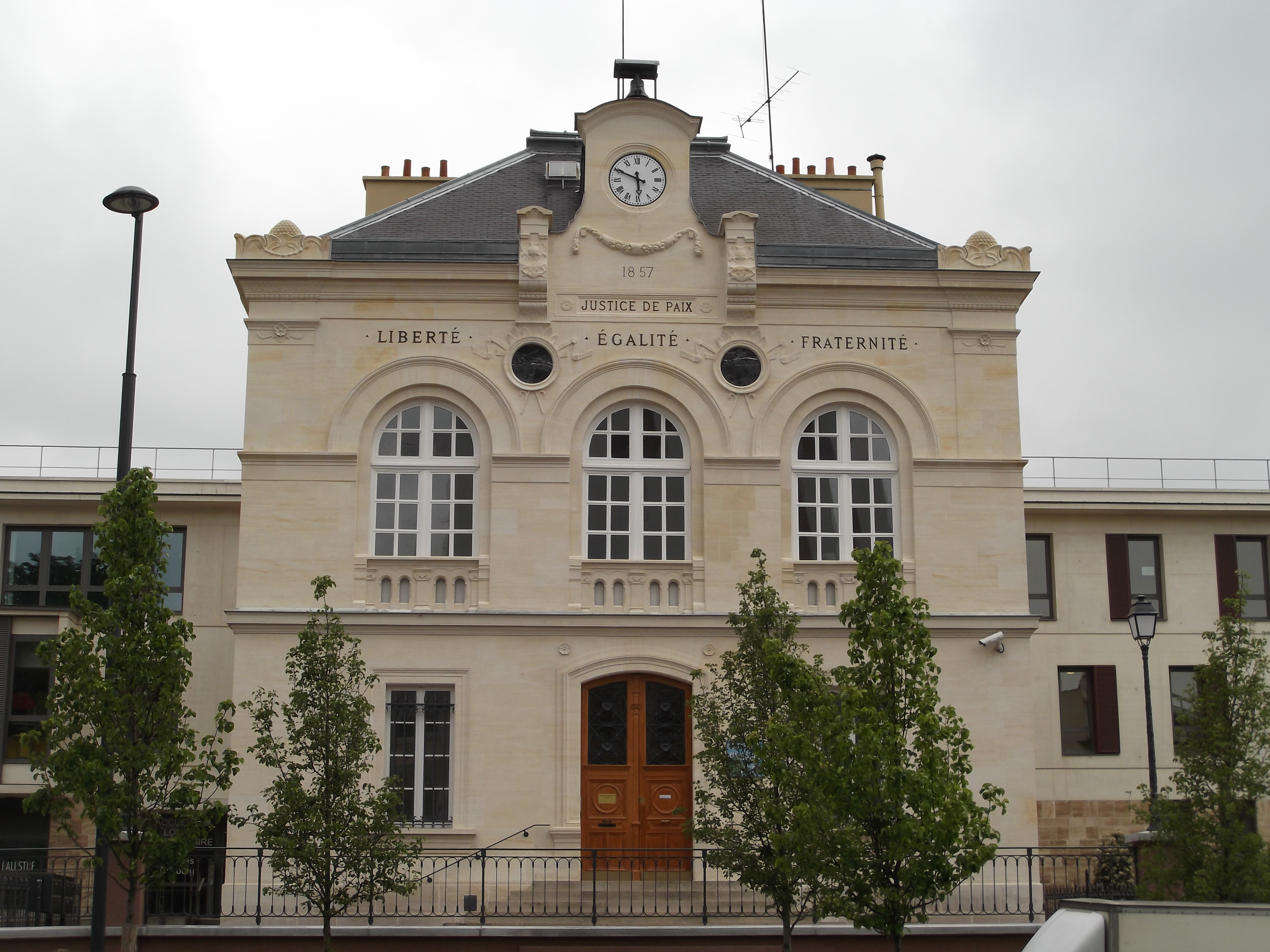
The old town of 1857

Following the French Revolution, the town council initially met in a rented room in a building attached the Church of Saint-Rémy. In the early 1830s, the mayor, Félix Voisin, rented a room in the former schoolteacher's house. Both these facilities were considered inadequate and in the mid-19th century, the council decided to commission a dedicated municipal building. The site they selected was on the south side of what is now Rue Antoine Fratacci. The building was designed by Claude Naissant in the neoclassical style, built in ashlar stone and was completed in 1857.

The design involved a symmetrical main frontage of three bays facing onto the street. The central bay featured a segmental headed doorway on the ground floor, a round headed window with a hood mould on the first floor and a clock above. The other bays were fenestrated by casement windows on the ground floor and round headed windows with hood moulds on the first floor. There were oculi in the spandrels above the first-floor windows. After the building was no longer required for municipal use, it served as a courthouse and subsequently accommodated the Tribunal d'Instance.

In the late 19th century, following significant population growth, the council led by the mayor, Eugène Baudouin, decided to commission a more substantial town hall. The site they selected was on the north side of what is now Rue Antoine Fratacci, facing onto what is now Rue Mary Besseyre. The new building was designed by Camille Morel and Emile Lecamp in the neoclassical style, built in ashlar stone and was officially opened by the Minister for Public Instruction, Léon Bourgeois, on 23 July 1898.

The design involved a symmetrical main frontage of five bays facing onto the street. The central bay featured a short flight of steps leaded up to a doorway with a keystone and voussoirs. The other bays on the ground floor were fenestrated by casement windows with keystones and voussoirs. The first floor was fenestrated by larger casement windows with stone surrounds and keystones. There was a balustraded balcony across the central three bays and, at roof level, there was an ornate frieze, a cornice, a parapet, and a clock above the central bay. Internally, the principal room was the Salle des Mariages (wedding room) which featured fine murals and a ceiling, all decorated by the artist, Henri Gaston Darien.

On 25 August 1944, during the Second World War, following the official liberation of the town by the French 2nd Armoured Division, commanded by General Philippe Leclerc, the French tricolour was raised on a flagpole in front of the town hall.

A modern administrative centre, accommodating a theatre, three storeys of municipal offices and 16 floors of apartments, was erected to the west of the town hall in 1978. A bust of the Russian poet, Marina Tsvetaeva, by the sculptor Andrei Tyrtyshnikov, was installed in the foyer of the building in October 2016.
