= Malakoff–Rue Étienne Dolet station =

Metro station in Paris, France

Malakoff–Rue Étienne Dolet
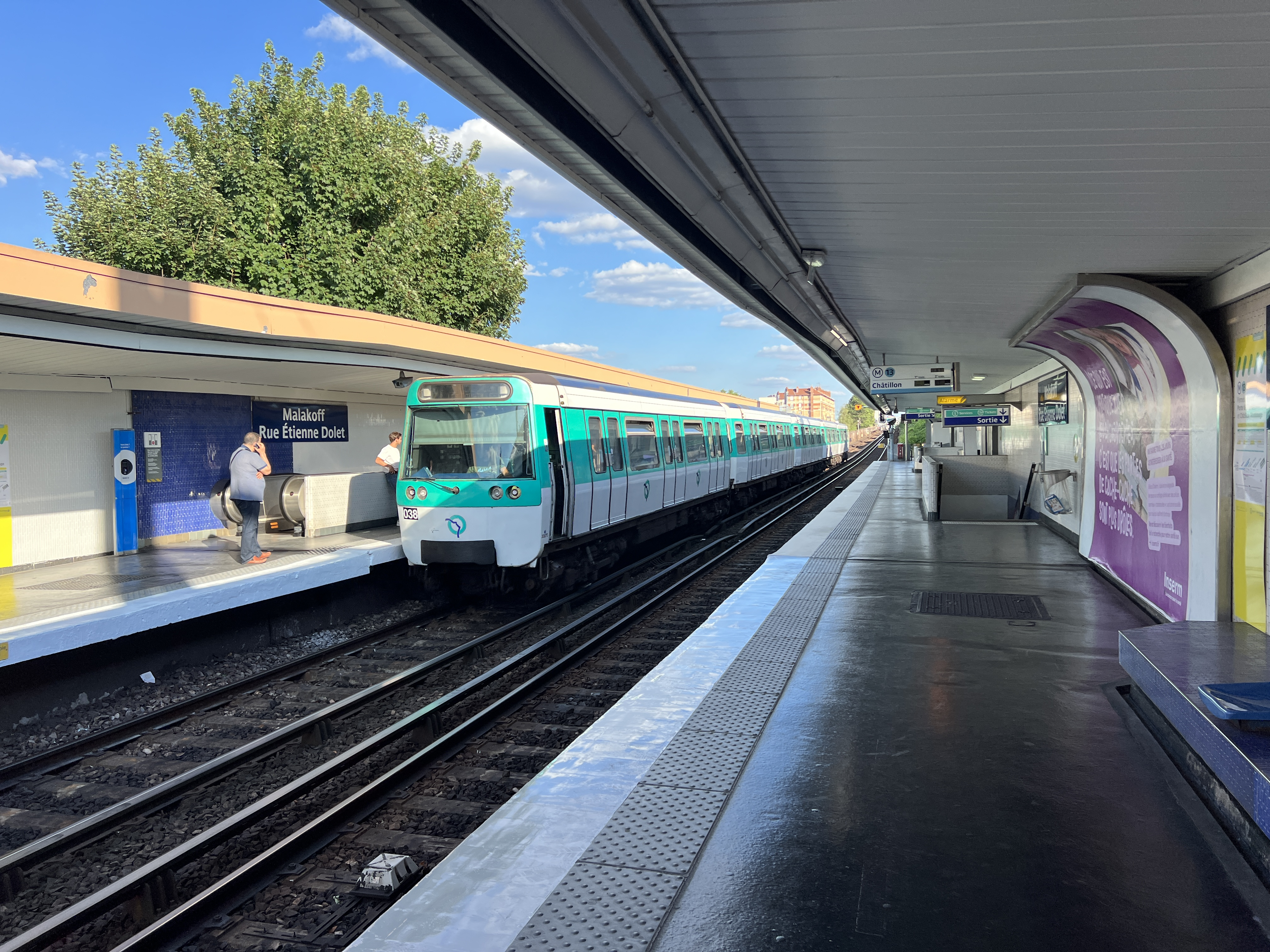
- MF 77 at Malakoff–Rue Étienne Dolet

General information
- Location: Malakoff; Île-de-France; France
- Coordinates: 48°48′53″N 2°17′50″E
- System: Paris Métro station
- Owner: RATP
- Operator: RATP
- Line: Paris Metro Paris Metro Line 13
- Platforms: 2 (2 side platforms)
- Tracks: 2

Construction
- Accessible: no

Other information
- Station code: 27-08
- Fare zone: 1

History
- Opened: 9 November 1976

Passengers
- 1,450,451 (2021)

Services
Preceding station	Paris Metro	Following station
Châtillon–Montrouge Terminus	Line 13	Malakoff–Plateau de Vanves towards Les Courtilles or Saint-Denis–Université
Location
- Location within Paris

Malakoff–Rue Étienne Dolet (French pronunciation: [malakɔf ʁy etjɛn dɔlɛ]) is an elevated station on Line 13 of the Paris Métro in the commune of Malakoff. It is named after the nearby rue Étienne-Dolet, which was named after Étienne Dolet (1509–1546), a French scholar, translator, printer, and author of several commentaries on the Latin language and poems.

== History ==
The station opened on 9 November 1976 as part of the extension of line 13 from Porte de Vanves to Châtillon–Montrouge, on the same day the old line 14 was incorporated into line 13 following the latter's extension in successive phases from Saint-Lazare.

As part of the "Un métro + beau" programme by the RATP, the station's corridors were renovated and modernised on 10 June 2005.

In 2019, the station was used by 2,048,140 passengers, making it the 242nd busiest of the Métro network out of 302 stations.

In 2020, the station was used by 1,054,998 passengers amidst the COVID-19 pandemic, making it the 237th busiest of the Métro network out of 304 stations.

In 2021, the station was used by 1,450,451 passengers, making it the 238th busiest of the Métro network out of 304 stations.

== Passenger services ==
=== Access ===
The station has a single access at rue Guy-Môquet. Since June 2020, a fresco by the artist Raphe from the street art collective Haut En Couleur (HEC) has decorated the walls of its stairway and vestibule.

=== Station layout ===
Platform level	Side platform, doors will open on the right
Platform level	Northbound	← toward Les Courtilles or Saint-Denis–Université (Malakoff–Plateau de Vanves)
Platform level	Southbound	toward Châtillon – Montrouge (Terminus) →
Platform level	Side platform, doors will open on the right
1F	Mezzanine
Street Level

=== Platforms ===
The station has a standard configuration with 2 tracks surrounded by 2 side platforms. Metal advertising frames are installed on the platform towards Châtillon–Montrouge. Similar to the ones at Créteil–Préfecture on line 8, they are curved at the top.

=== Other connections ===
The station is also served by lines 191 and 391 of the RATP bus network and the L'Hirondelle of the Vallée Sud bus network.

== Nearby ==
- Fort de Vanves
- Promenade départementale des Vallons-de-la-Bièvre

== Gallery ==
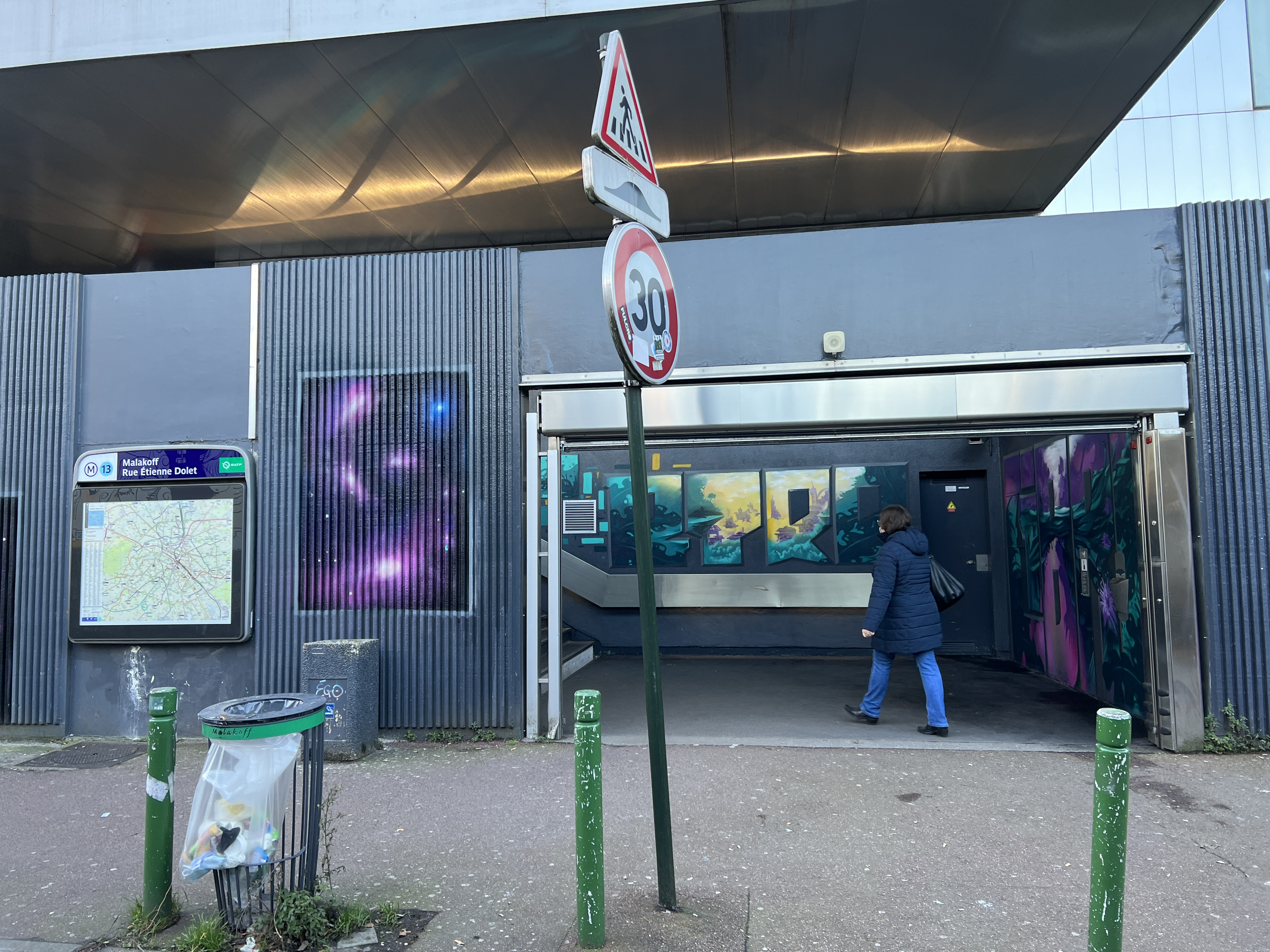
Access at rue Guy-Môquet

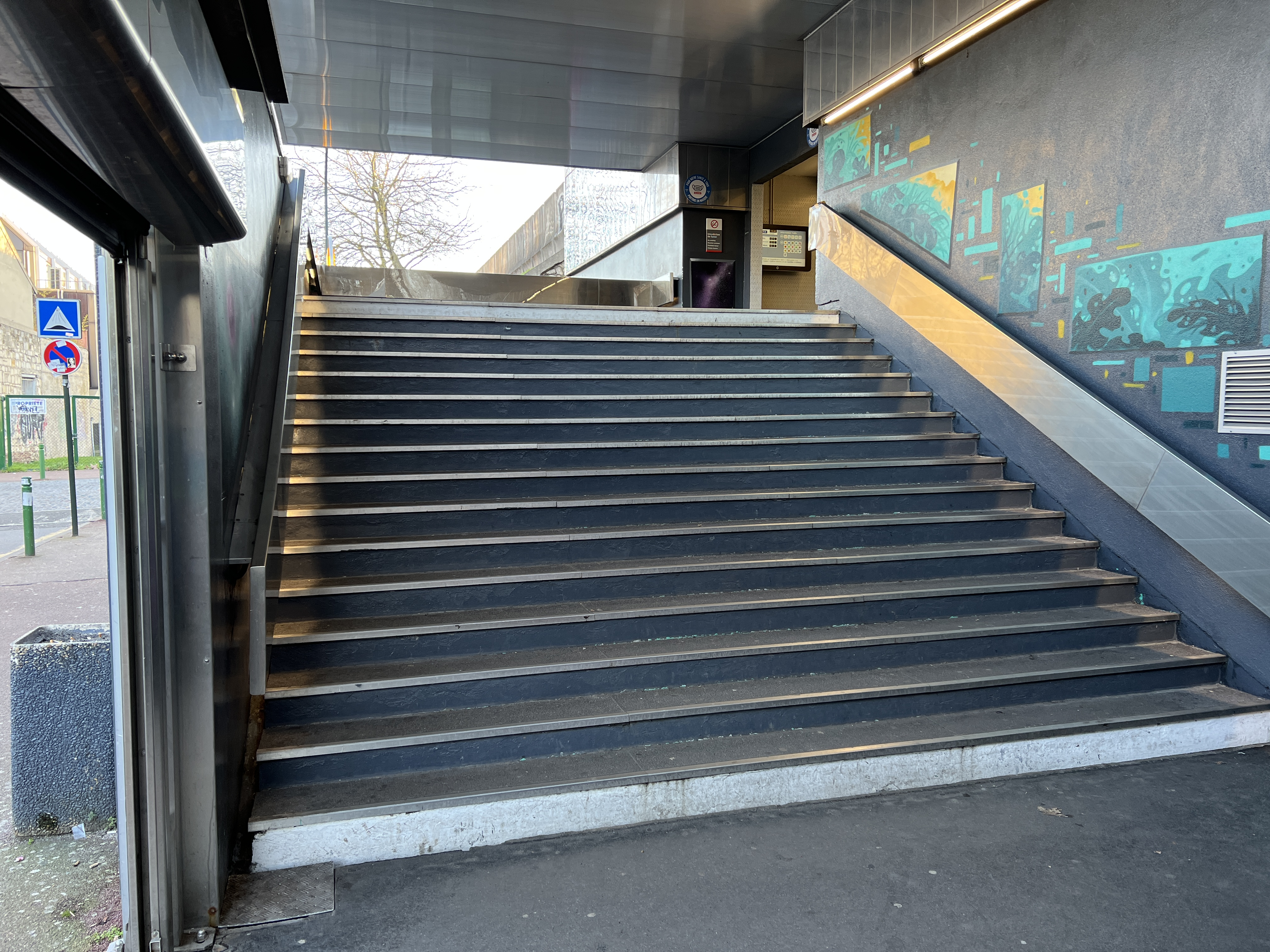
A fresco by the artist Raphe
