= Viroflay Rive Droite station =

Railway station in Viroflay, France

Viroflay Rive Droite
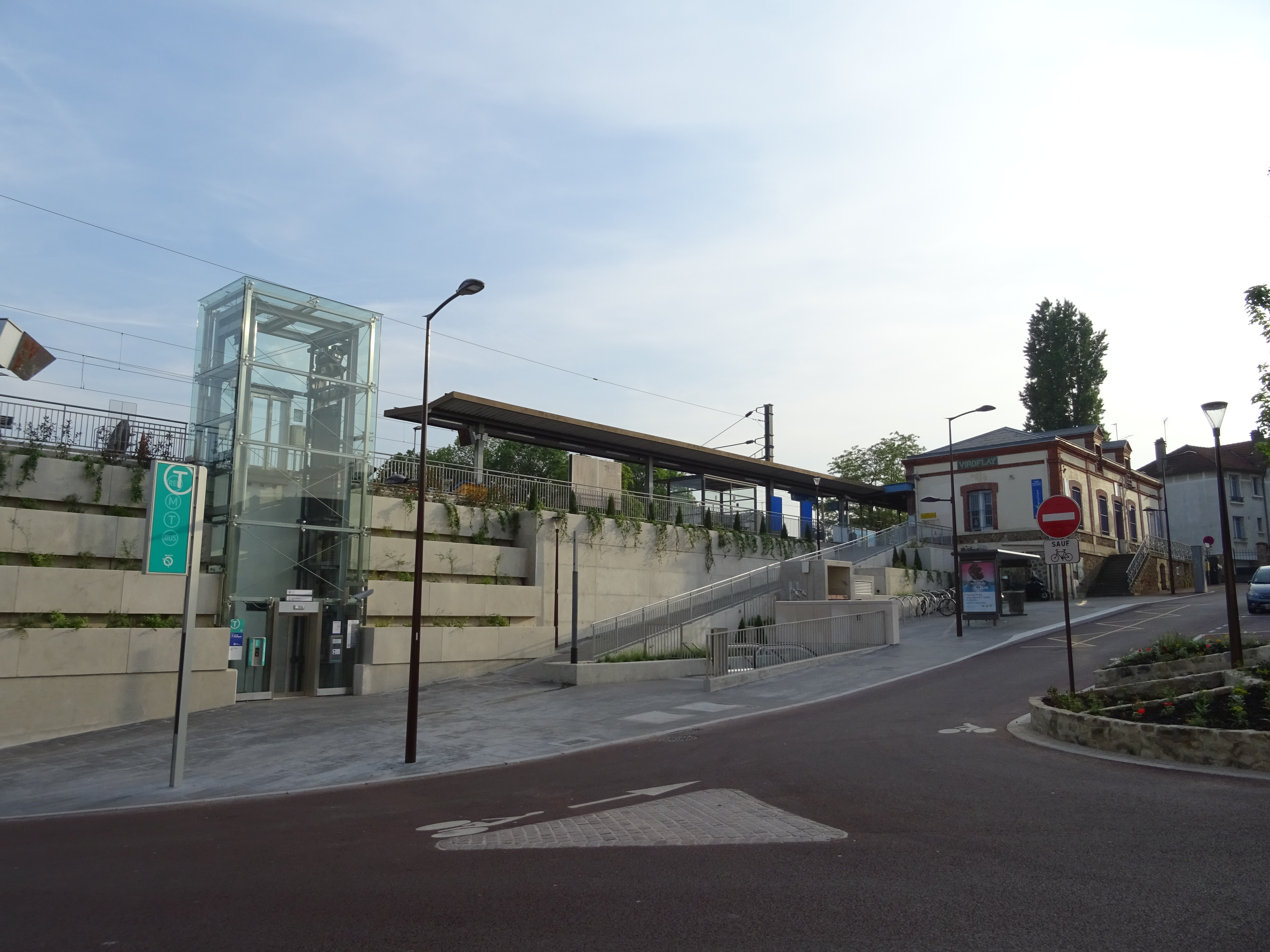

General information
- Location: 1 Place Stalingrad, 78220 Viroflay
- Coordinates: 48.8056°N 2.1683°E
- Owner: RFF
- Line: Transilien Transilien Line L (Paris-Saint-Lazare)
- Platforms: 4
- Tracks: 2 railway + 2 Translohr
- Connections: Bus

Construction
- Depth: 114 metres (374 ft)
- Platform levels: 1: 0: -1: Mezzanine haute -2 -3: Mezzanine basse -4:

Other information
- Station code: 87382887
- Fare zone: 3

History
- Opened: 18 July 1840
- Electrified: 1976

Passengers
- 2024: 2,672,068

Services
| Preceding station | Transilien | Following station |
|---|---|---|
| Montreuil towards Versailles–Rive Droite | Line L | Chaville-Rive-Droite towards Paris–Saint Lazare |
| Preceding station | Tram | Following station |
| Terminus | T6 | Viroflay-Rive-Gauche towards Châtillon–Montrouge |
Location

Viroflay Rive Droite station (French: Gare de Viroflay-Rive-Droite) is a railway station in the commune of Viroflay (department of Yvelines). It is in the Île-de-France region of France and is part of the Transilien rail network, on the Paris-Saint-Lazare – Versailles Rive Droite line. It is also an underground tram-on-tyres stop on line 6.

The name "Rive-Droite" refers to the trains' Paris destination (Saint-Lazare) being on the right bank of the Seine.

The Transilien & tramway platforms are connected by an IMEM Ascenseurs lift.
