= Île-de-France tramway Line 6 =

Suburban tram line in Hauts-de-Seine and Yvelines, southwest of Paris

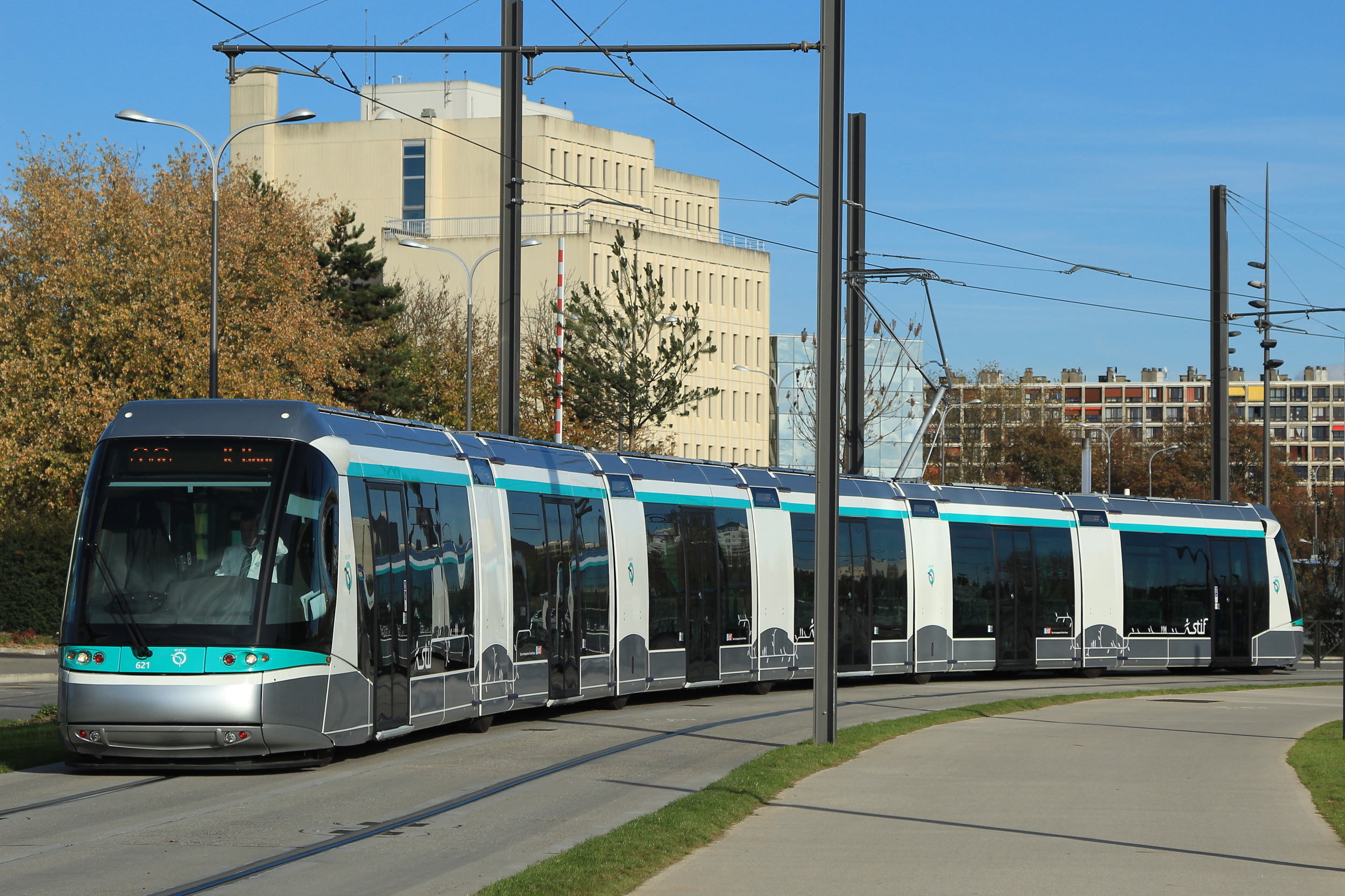
- Île-de-France tramway Line 6 travelling between Vélizy 2 and Dewoitine stations

Overview
- Owner: Île-de-France Mobilités
- Termini: Viroflay-Rive-Droite; Châtillon–Montrouge
- Stations: 21

Service
- Type: Tram
- System: Tramways in Île-de-France
- Operator: RATP Group
- Rolling stock: 28 Translohr STE6
- Ridership: 18.8 million (2019)

History
- Opened: 13 December 2014; 11 years ago
- Last extension: 28 May 2016

Technical
- Line length: 14 km (8.7 mi)
- Electrification: Overhead line, 750 V DC
Route map

Île-de-France tramway Line 6 (usually called simply T6) is part of the modern tram network of the Île-de-France region of France. Line 6 connects Viroflay-Rive-Droite station and Châtillon–Montrouge Paris Métro station, south-west of Paris. Line 6 is one of the Île-de-France's two rubber-tyred tramway lines based on the Translohr system. The line has a length of 14 km (8.7 mi) and 21 stations. It opened to the public on 13 December 2014. The line was extended by 2.6 km (1.6 mi) (including a tunnel of 1.6 km (0.99 mi)) and two stations in May 2016.

The line is operated by the RATP Group under contract with Île-de-France Mobilités.

== See also ==
- List of rubber-tyred tram systems
