= Châtillon–Montrouge station =

Metro station in Paris, France

Châtillon–Montrouge
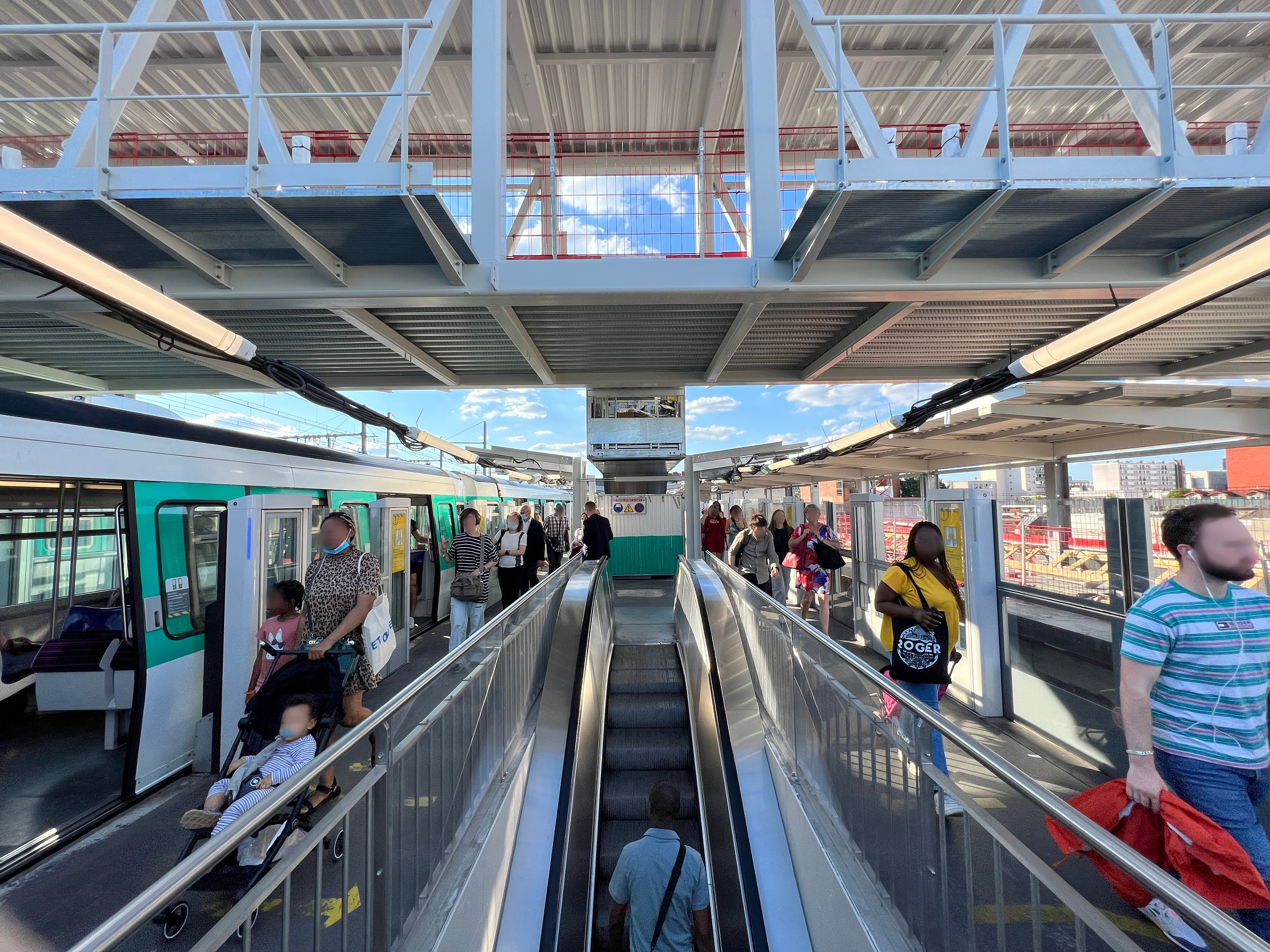
- Châtillon–Montrouge station, island platform for Line 13

General information
- Location: Châtillon and Montrouge, Hauts-de-Seine; Île-de-France; France
- Coordinates: 48°48′38″N 2°18′07″E
- Operator: Line 13: RATP Group; Line 15: ORA (RATP Dev, Alstom & ComfortDelGro)
- Platforms: Line 13: 1 island platform, 2 side platforms; Line 15: 2 side platforms
- Tracks: Line 13: 3; Line 15: 2
- Connections: Tramways in Île-de-France Île-de-France tramway Line 6

Construction
- Depth: Line 15: 31 m (102 ft)
- Accessible: Line 13: No; Line 15: Yes
- Architect: Line 15: Périphériques architectes (Anne-Françoise Jumeau, Marin + Trottin)

Other information
- Station code: 27-09
- Fare zone: 3

History
- Opened: November 9, 1976

Passengers
- 5,034,012 (2021)

Services
Preceding station	Paris Metro	Following station
Terminus	Line 13	Malakoff–Rue Étienne Dolet towards Les Courtilles or Saint-Denis–Université
Preceding station	Tram	Following station
Vauban towards Viroflay-Rive-Droite	T6	Terminus

Future services
Preceding station	Paris Metro	Following station
Clamart towards Pont de Sèvres	Line 15 (autumn 2027)	Bagneux–Lucie Aubrac towards Noisy–Champs
Location
- Location within Paris

Châtillon–Montrouge station (French pronunciation: [ʃɑtijɔ̃ mɔ̃ʁuʒ]) is the southern terminus of Line 13 of the Paris Metro and the eastern terminus of tramway Line 6. It is an elevated station located on the border between the communes of Châtillon and Montrouge in Hauts-de-Seine.

== History ==
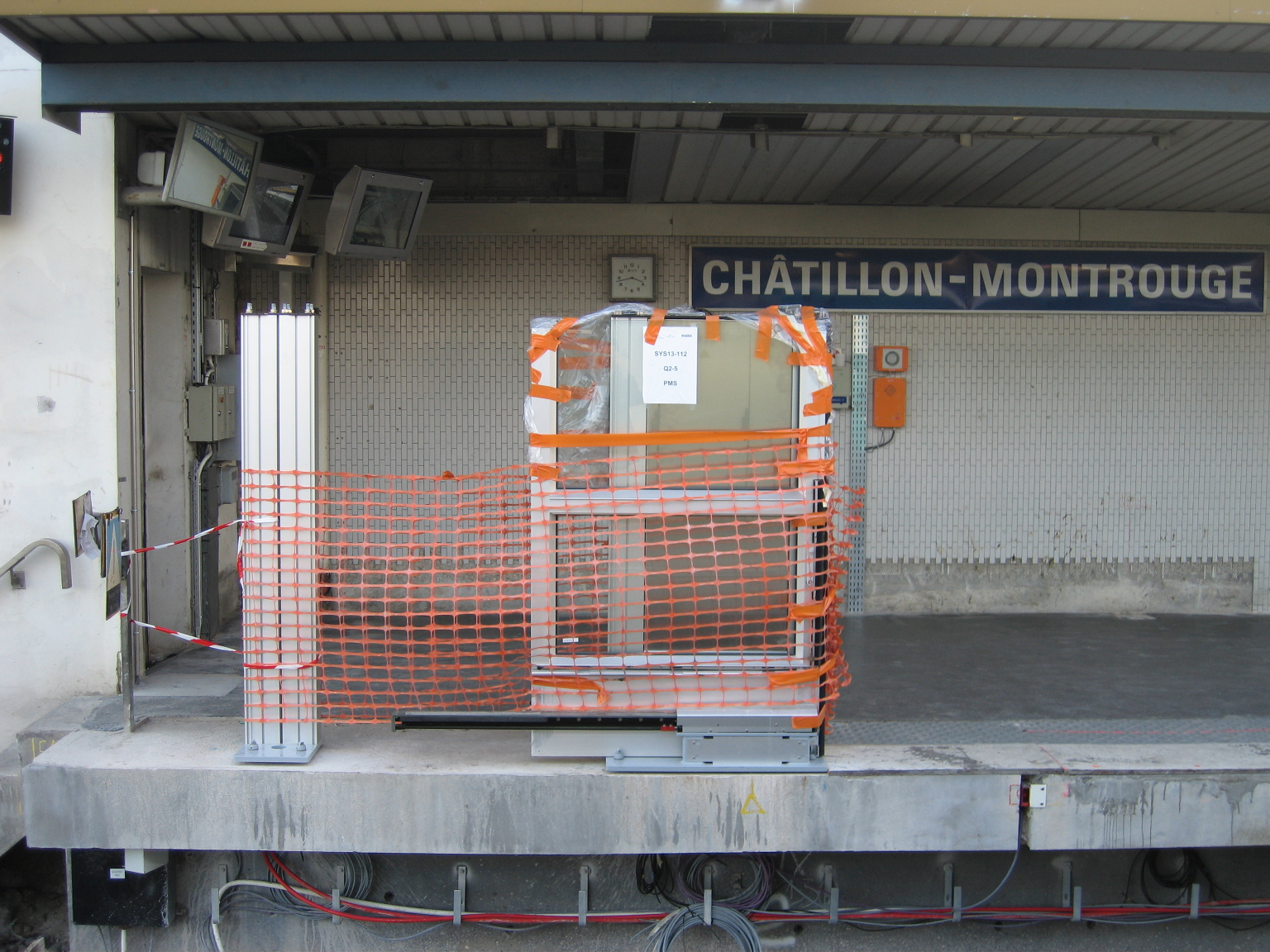
Installation of platform screen doors in 2008

The station opened on 9 November 1976 as part of the extension of line 13 from Porte de Vanves to Châtillon–Montrouge, on the same day the old line 14 was incorporated into line 13 following the latter's extension in successive phases from Saint-Lazare.

Since June 2008, to enable automatic train reversal at the station, platform screen doors have been installed on the platforms to prevent passengers from falling onto the tracks when no drivers are present in the trains during this operation. It was the first station on the line to receive them.

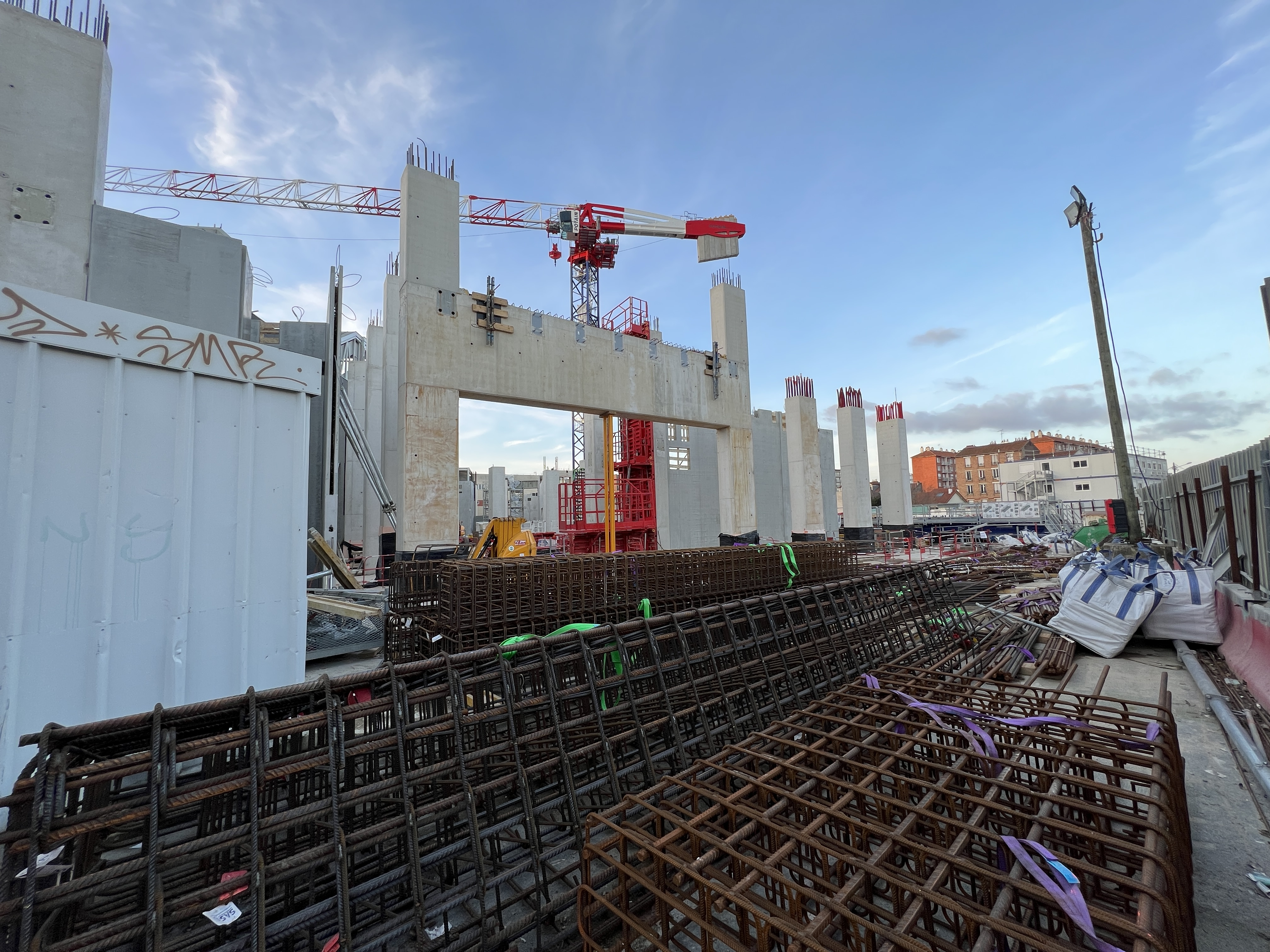
Construction of line 15 in 2023

In 2019, the station was used by 7,196,503 passengers, making it the 39th busiest of the Metro network out of 302 stations.

In 2020, the station was used by 3,738,453 passengers amidst the COVID-19 pandemic, making it the 33rd busiest of the Metro network out of 304 stations.

In 2021, the station was used by 5,034,012 passengers, making it the 35th busiest of the Metro network out of 304 stations.

As part of the Grand Paris Express, the station will become an interchange with Line 15, with preparatory work having begun in 2015 to free up space for the station, and construction since 2018. It is slated to open in autumn 2027.

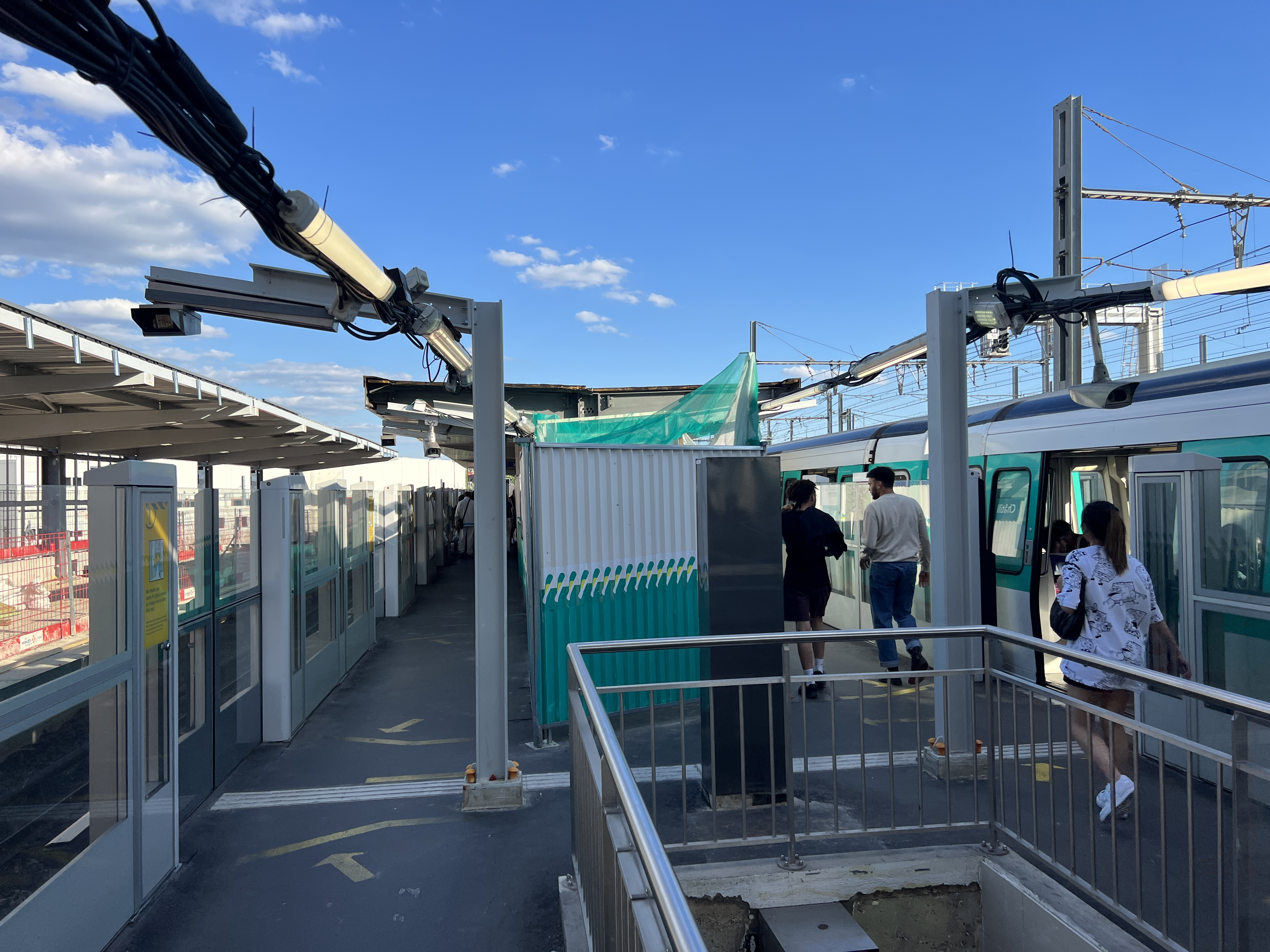
Renovation of line 13's station in July 2022

The station will consist of five intermediate levels, including a mezzanine, with an artistic ceiling in the atrium designed by Laurent Grasso and David Trottin. The 800 m^{2} (8,611 sq ft) work will consist of 2750 printed aluminum blades that form a trompe-l'oeil sky inspired by Renaissance paintings and will vibrate with the circulation of air. As part of the Illustrer le Grand Paris programme by the Société du Grand Paris, which aimed to illustrate Île-de-France territories served by the new Metro lines, the station's platforms will feature a fresco designed by Roxane Lumeret.

In November 2019, the tunnel boring machine, Ellen, reached the station, completing the tunneling at the station. Civil works, including the excavation of the station box, were completed in end-May 2022. The installation of infrastructure such as escalators and lifts, networks (electrical, telephony, plumbing), painting, and construction of the surface building will take place over the next two years.

The existing line 13's station was upgraded in early 2023 as part of the project. Its existing platforms were renovated and a sheltered footbridge was added above the platforms to connect to line 15. A new side platform was constructed to serve as an additional departure platform to accommodate the increased traffic expected when line 15 opens. It is located next to the surface building for line 15 and is equipped with an emergency exit.

== Passenger services ==
=== Access ===
The station has two accesses:

- Access 1: avenue Marx Dormoy (Montrouge)
- Access 2: rue de l'Avenir (Châtillon)

=== Station layout ===
1F	Mezzanine
Platform level	Side platform, with PSDs, doors will open on the left
Platform level	Northbound	← toward Saint-Denis–Université or Les Courtilles (Malakoff–Rue Étienne Dolet)
Platform level	Island platform, with PSDs, doors will open on the left, right
Platform level	Northbound	← toward Saint-Denis–Université or Les Courtilles (Malakoff–Rue Étienne Dolet)
Platform level	Southbound	Alighting passengers only →
Platform level	Side platform, with PSDs, doors will open on the right
Street Level

=== Other connections ===
==== Tramway ====
The station has been served by a rubber-tired tram, tramway T6, since 13 December 2014 as part of its initial section between Châtillon–Montrouge and Robert Wagner, serving as its eastern terminus.

==== Bus ====
- RATP bus network: lines 68, 194, 195, 294, 323, 388, and 391
- Noctilien: lines 63 and 68
- Vallée Sud bus network: lines Montbus and Amibus
- Saint-Quentin-en-Yvelines bus network: line 475

== Gallery ==
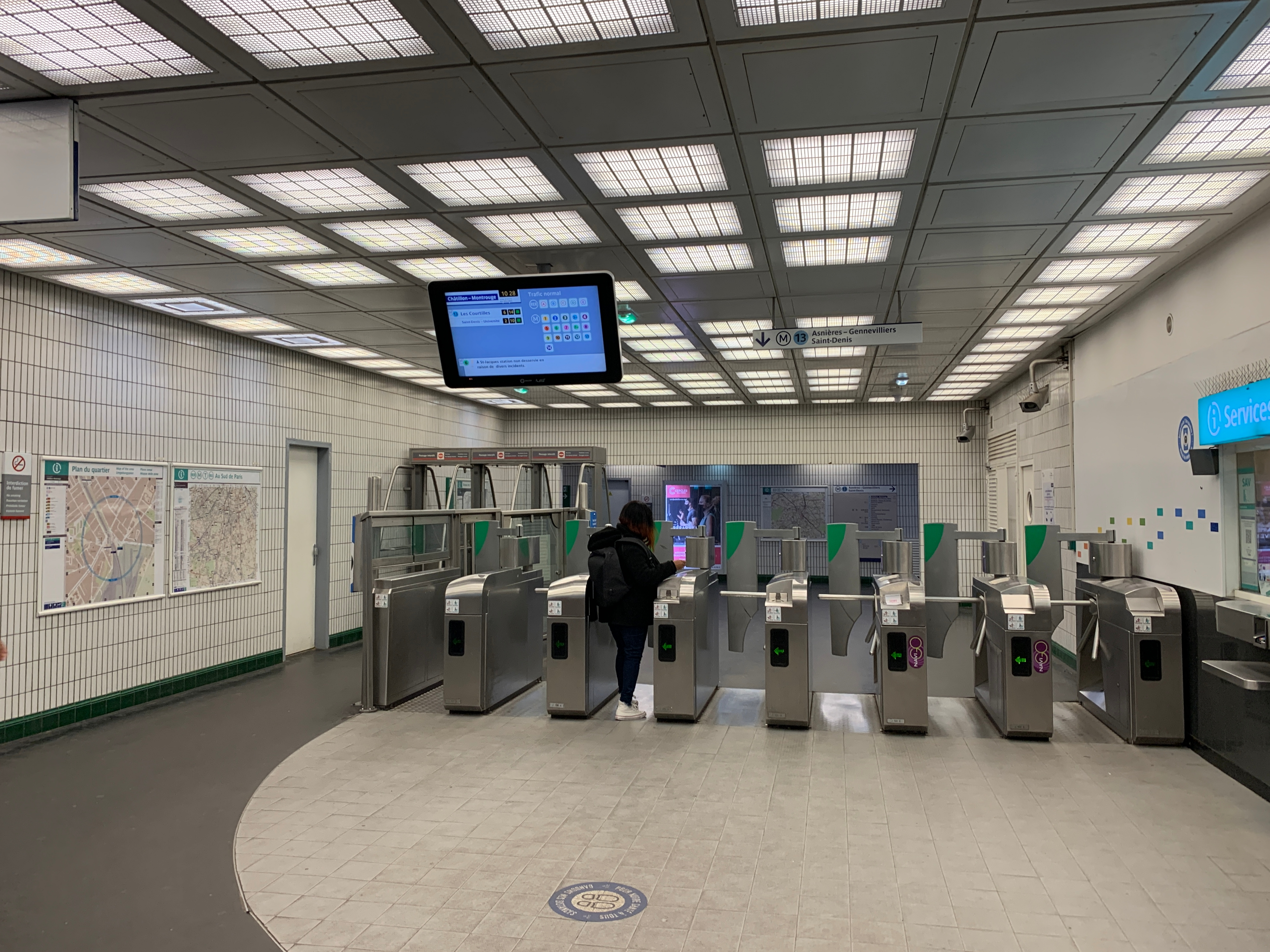
Ticket barriers

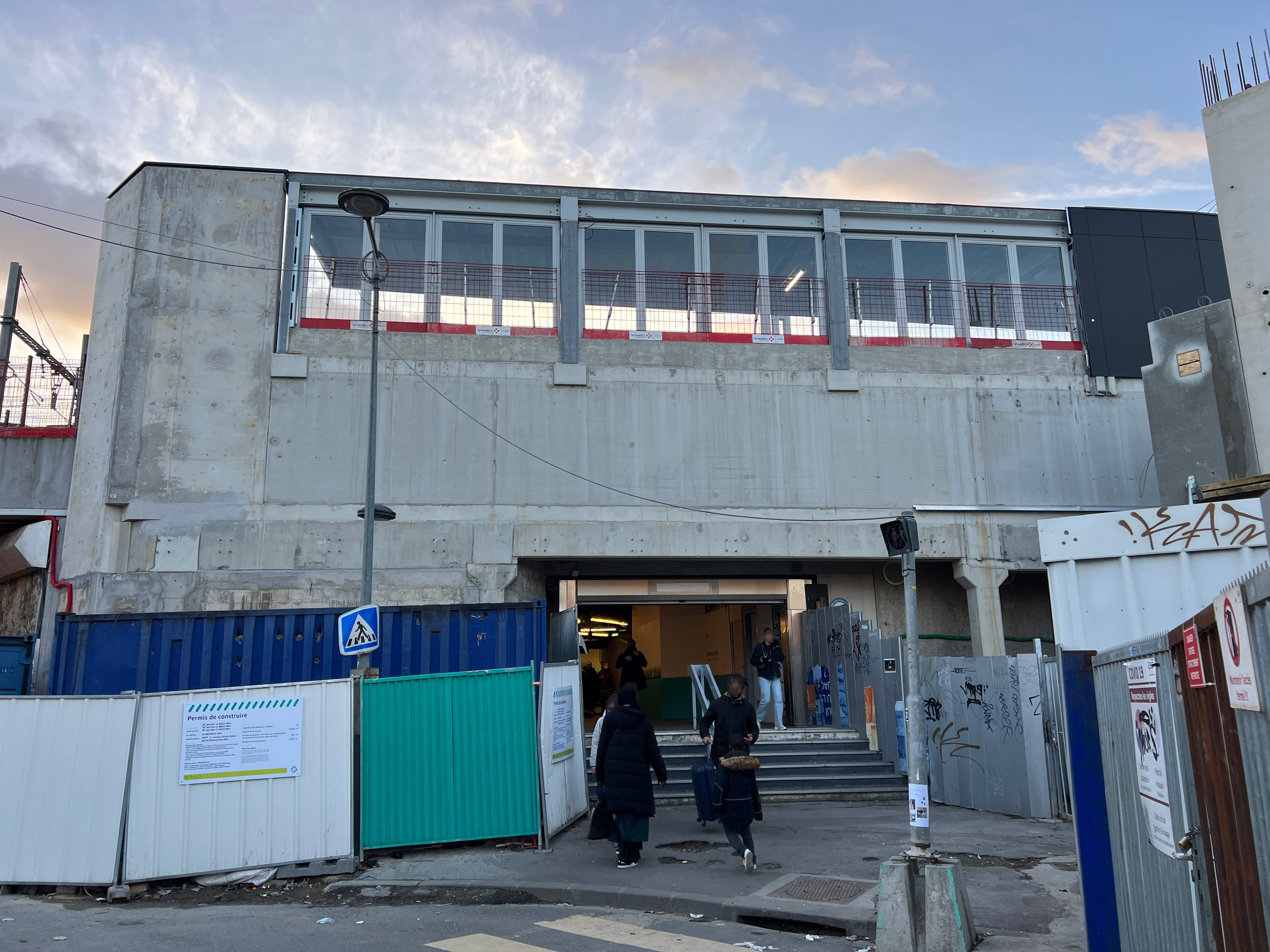
Access 1, with the construction of line 15's station visible around it

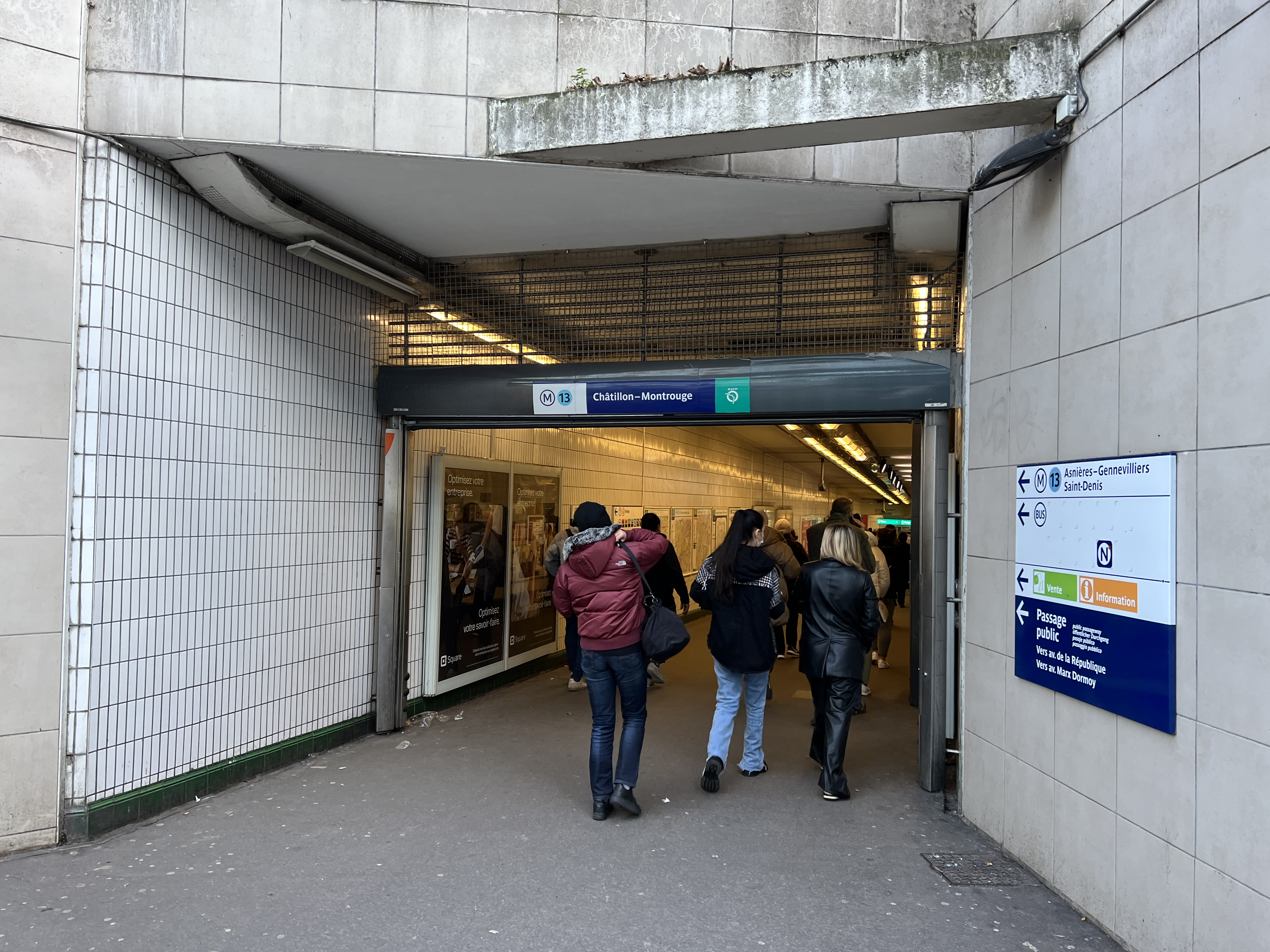
Access 2

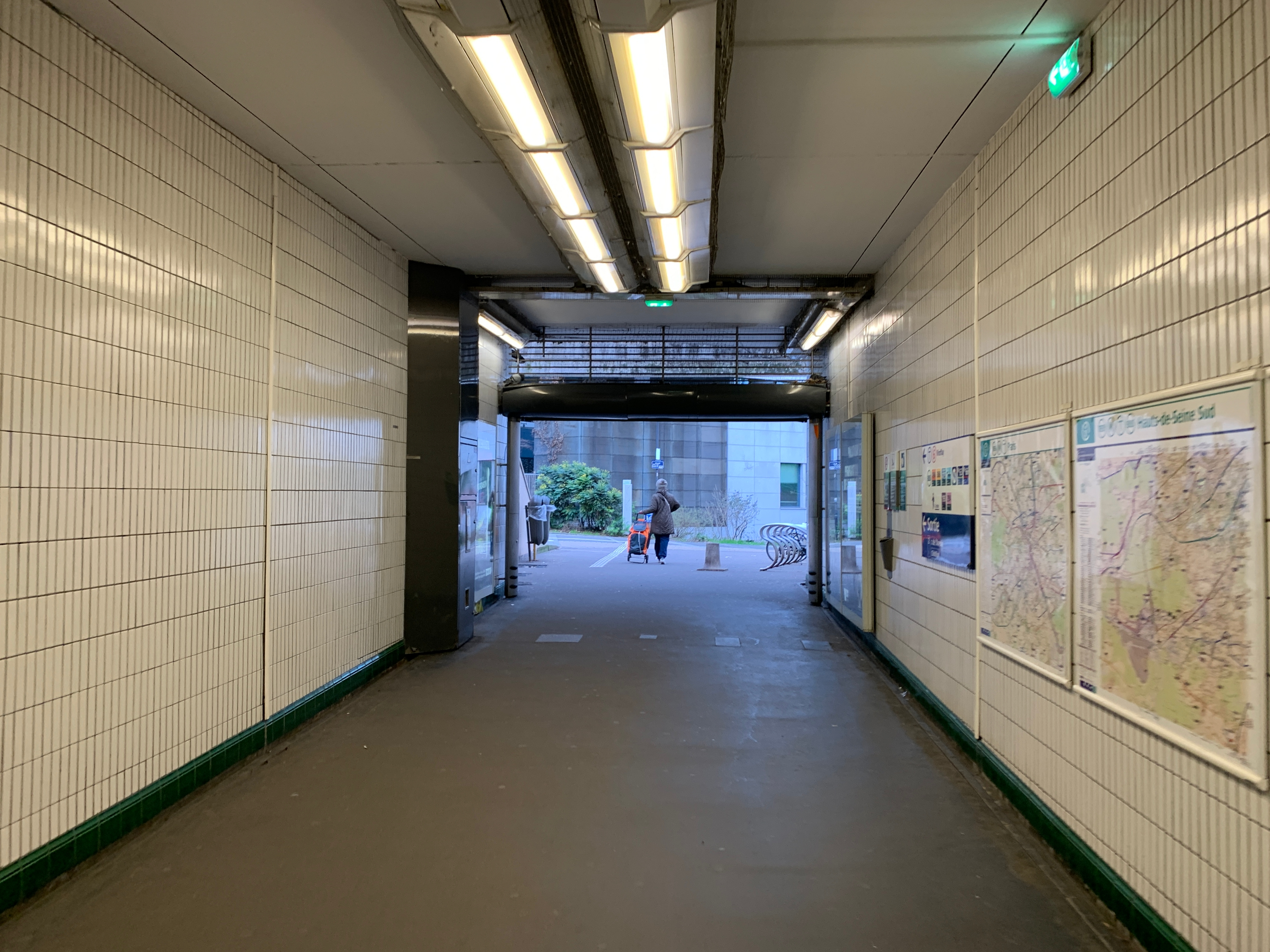
Another view of access 2

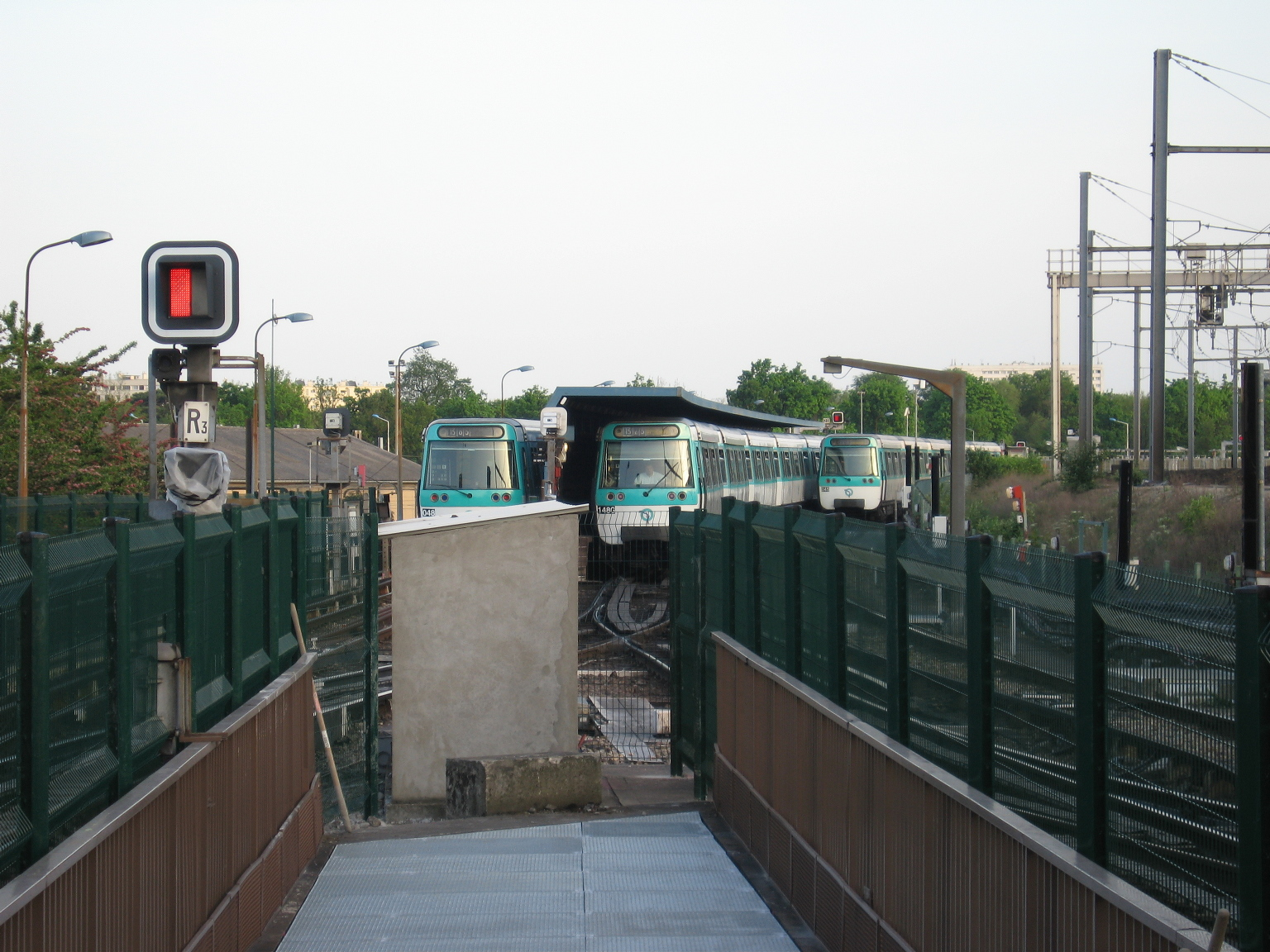
Yard south of the station
