= Malakoff, Hauts-de-Seine =

Malakoff
- Commune
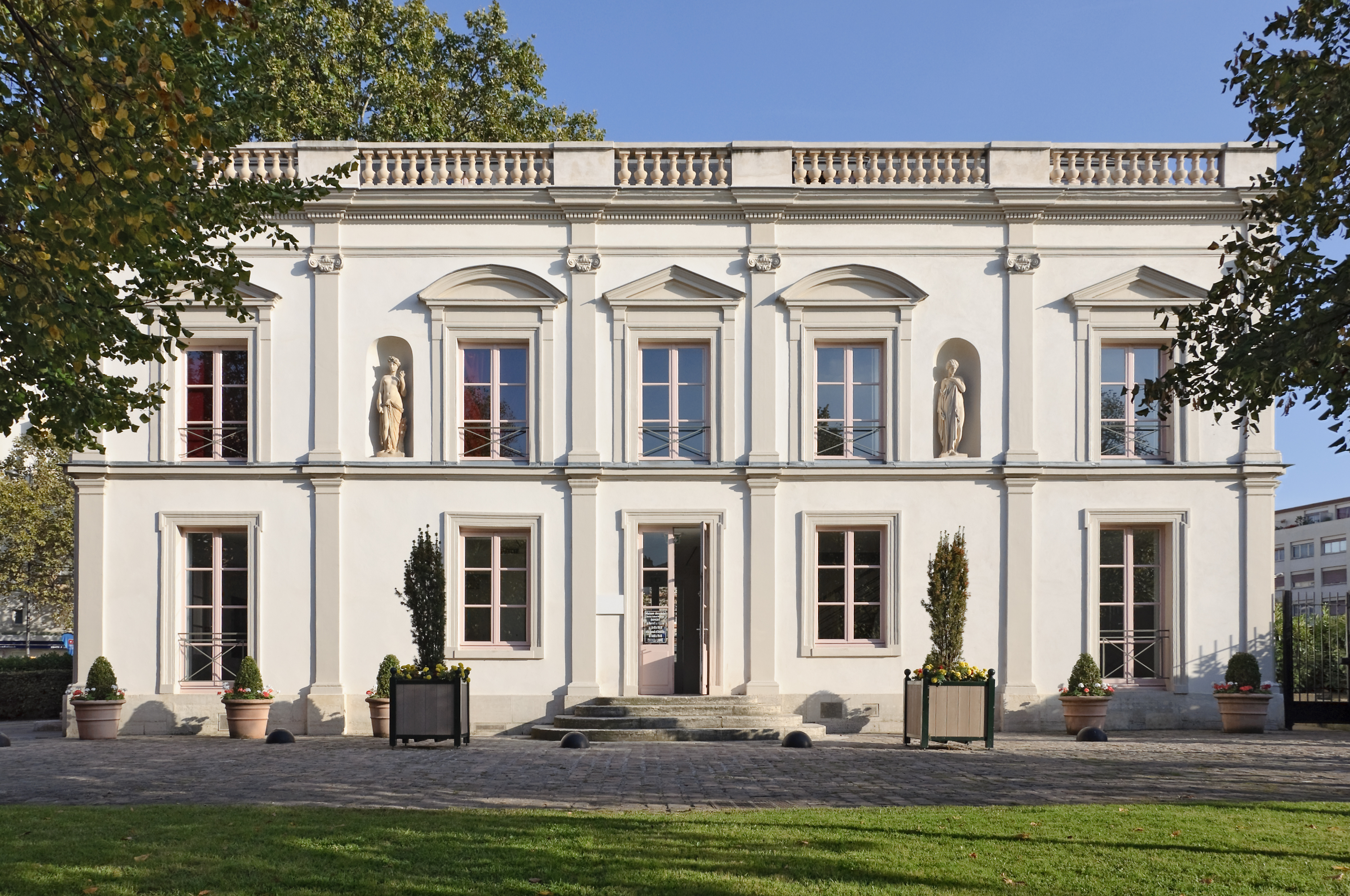
- Maison des Arts

- Coat of arms

- Location (in red) within Paris inner suburbs
- Location of Malakoff
- Location within France Location within Île-de-France (region)
- Coordinates: 48°49′01″N 2°17′40″E
- Country: France
- Region: Île-de-France
- Department: Hauts-de-Seine
- Arrondissement: Antony
- Canton: Montrouge
- Intercommunality: Grand Paris

Government
  - Mayor (2026–32): Sonia Figueres
- Area^{1}: 2.07 km^{2} (0.80 sq mi)
- Highest elevation: 80 m (260 ft)
- Lowest elevation: 67 m (220 ft)
- Population (2023): 30,557
  - Density: 14,800/km^{2} (38,200/sq mi)
- Time zone: UTC+01:00 (CET)
  - Summer (DST): UTC+02:00 (CEST)
- INSEE/Postal code: 92046 /92240
- ^{1} French Land Register data, which excludes lakes, ponds, glaciers > 1 km^{2} (0.386 sq mi or 247 acres) and river estuaries.

Malakoff (French pronunciation: [malakɔf]) is a suburban commune in the Hauts-de-Seine department southwest of Paris, France, located 5 km (3.1 mi) from the centre of the city. As of 2023, the population of the commune was 30,557. The European Organisation for Civil Aviation Equipment (EUROCAE) is based in Malakoff.

== History ==
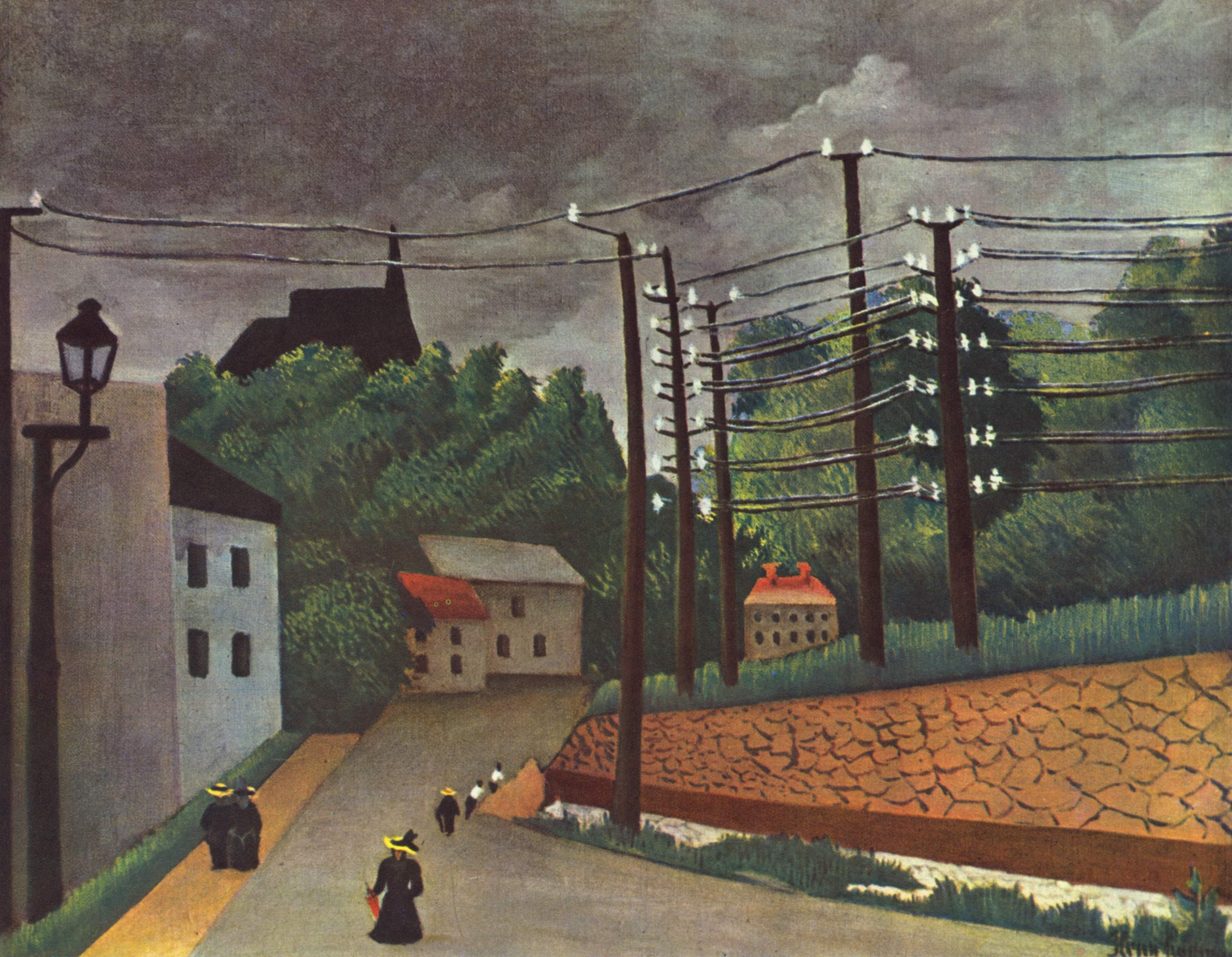
Malakoff in a painting by Henri Rousseau

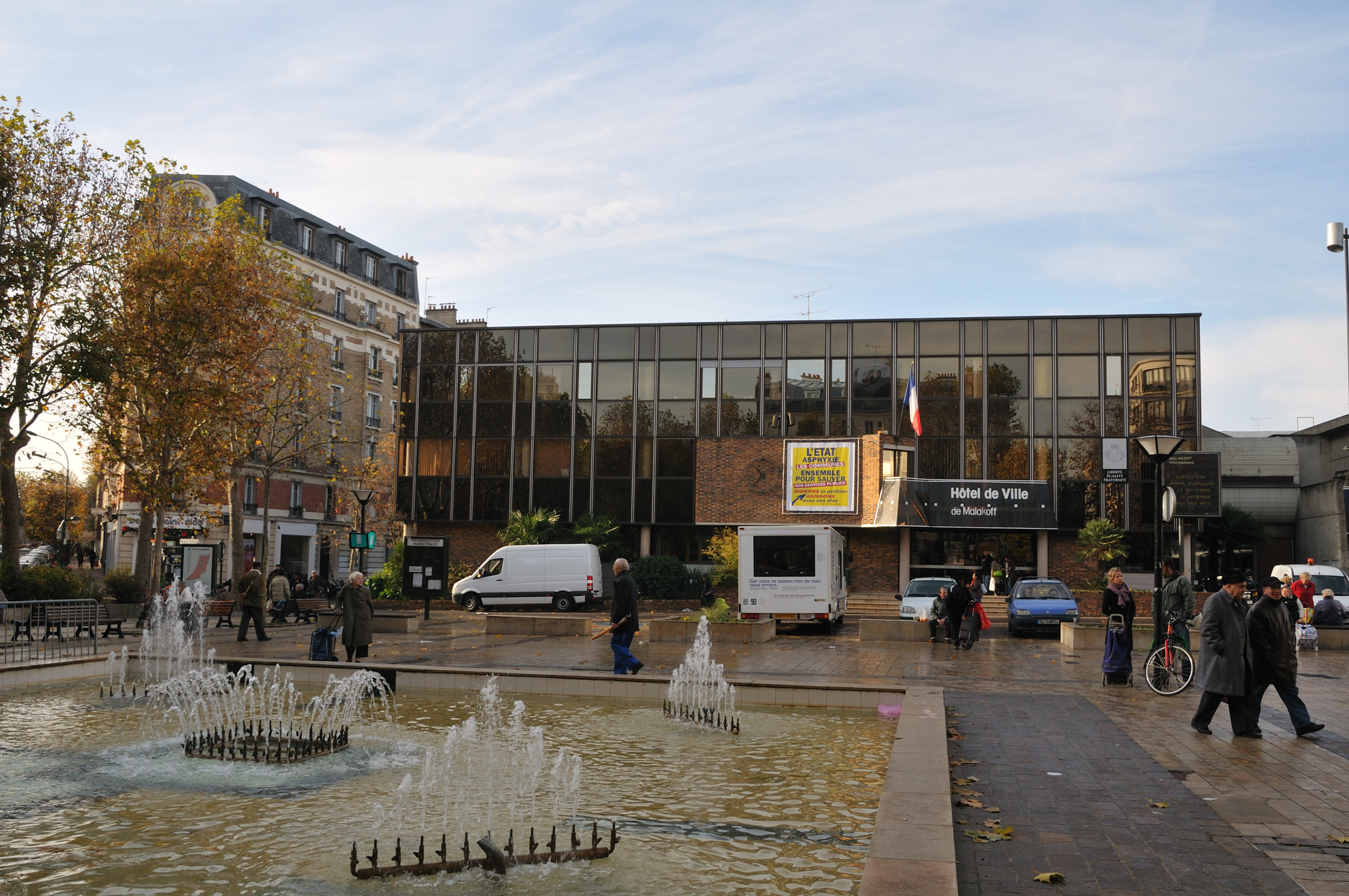
The Hôtel de Ville

The commune of Malakoff was created on 8 November 1883 by detaching its territory from the commune of Vanves. Its name was taken from an inn sign À la Tour de Malakoff ("At the Malakoff Tower"); the inn was so named in 1855 to commemorate the Battle of Malakoff, fought during the Crimean War.

The Hôtel de Ville was completed in 1976.

== Population ==
Historical population

Year	Pop.	±% p.a.
1886	8,118	—
1891	9,144	+2.41%
1896	11,027	+3.82%
1901	14,341	+5.40%
1906	16,630	+3.01%
1911	19,789	+3.54%
1921	22,494	+1.29%
1926	23,817	+1.15%
1931	27,464	+2.89%
1936	28,439	+0.70%
1946	27,459	−0.35%

Year	Pop.	±% p.a.
1954	28,876	+0.63%
1962	33,603	+1.91%
1968	36,198	+1.25%
1975	34,121	−0.84%
1982	32,553	−0.67%
1990	30,959	−0.63%
1999	29,402	−0.57%
2007	30,735	+0.56%
2012	30,420	−0.21%
2017	30,720	+0.20%
2023	30,557	−0.09%

Source: EHESS and INSEE (1968-2023)

== Transport ==
Malakoff is served by two stations on Paris Métro Line 13: Malakoff–Plateau de Vanves and Malakoff–Rue Étienne Dolet.

Malakoff is also served by Vanves–Malakoff station on the Transilien Line N suburban rail line. This station is located on the border between the commune of Malakoff and the commune of Vanves, on the Vanves side.

== Education ==
Public primary schools:

- Eight public preschools (maternelles): Georges-Cogniot, Fernand-Léger, Jean-Jaurès, Guy-Môquet, Paul-Bert, Paul-Vaillant-Couturier, Paul-Langevin, Henri-Barbusse
- Seven public elementary schools: Georges-Cogniot, Fernand-Léger, Jean-Jaurès, Guy-Môquet, Paul-Bert, Paul-Langevin, Henri-Barbusse

Public secondary schools:

- Junior high schools: Collège Paul-Bert and Collège Henri-Wallon
- Senior high school: Lycée professionnel Louis-Girard

There is a private school, École privée Notre-Dame-de-France.

Post-secondary

- ENSAE ParisTech

== Notable residents ==
- Christian Boltanski, sculptor, photographer, painter and film maker, lives and works in Malakoff
- Charles Bourseul (1829–1912), scientist, a pioneer in development of the telephone, lived at 62 Rue d'Arcueil (renamed Rue Paul Vaillant-Couturier).
- Sophie Calle, artist, lives and works in Malakoff.
- Eugène Christophe (1885–1970), cyclist, winner of the Milan-San Remo race and first wearer of the yellow jersey in the Tour de France.
- Gaëtan Gatian de Clérambault (1872–1934), was a psychiatrist, an ethnologist, and a photographer. Lived in a fine villa on Rue Vincent Moris.
- Pierre Curie (1859–1906) and Marie Curie (1867–1934) rented a house on Rue du Marché (renamed Rue Gabriel-Crié). They used a shed on the property for their radium experiments (1900 to 1904).
- Serge Danot (1931-1990), director and animator, creator of Le Manège enchanté
- Louis de Grandmaison, painter, lived in Malakoff.
- Edmond Lachenal, (1855–1948), potter who opened his first pottery works (from 1880 to 1887) in the city.
- Henri Désiré Landru (1869-1922), notorious serial killer, ran a car repair shop on Avenue de Châtillon (renamed Avenue Pierre Brossolette) in the 1910s.
- Roger Legris (1898–1981), stage and film actor.
- Annette Messager, artist, lives and works in Malakoff.
- Louise Michel (1830-1905), militant anarchist, feminist, important figure in the Paris Commune
- Pablo Reinoso, artist and designer, lives in Malakoff.
- Henri Rousseau, called "The Customs Agent", (1844–1910), painter, took his nickname from the fact that his full-time job was as a Paris customs agent (the octroi) at the Porte de Vanves in Malakoff.
- Sanyu (1901–1966), painter, lived from 1928 to 1931 in Malakoff on Rue Jean-Jacques Rousseau.
- Francesca Solleville, singer, lives in Malakoff.
- Sam Szafran (1934–2019), artist, lived and worked in Malakoff

== See also ==
- Communes of the Hauts-de-Seine department
