= Vanves =

- Commune
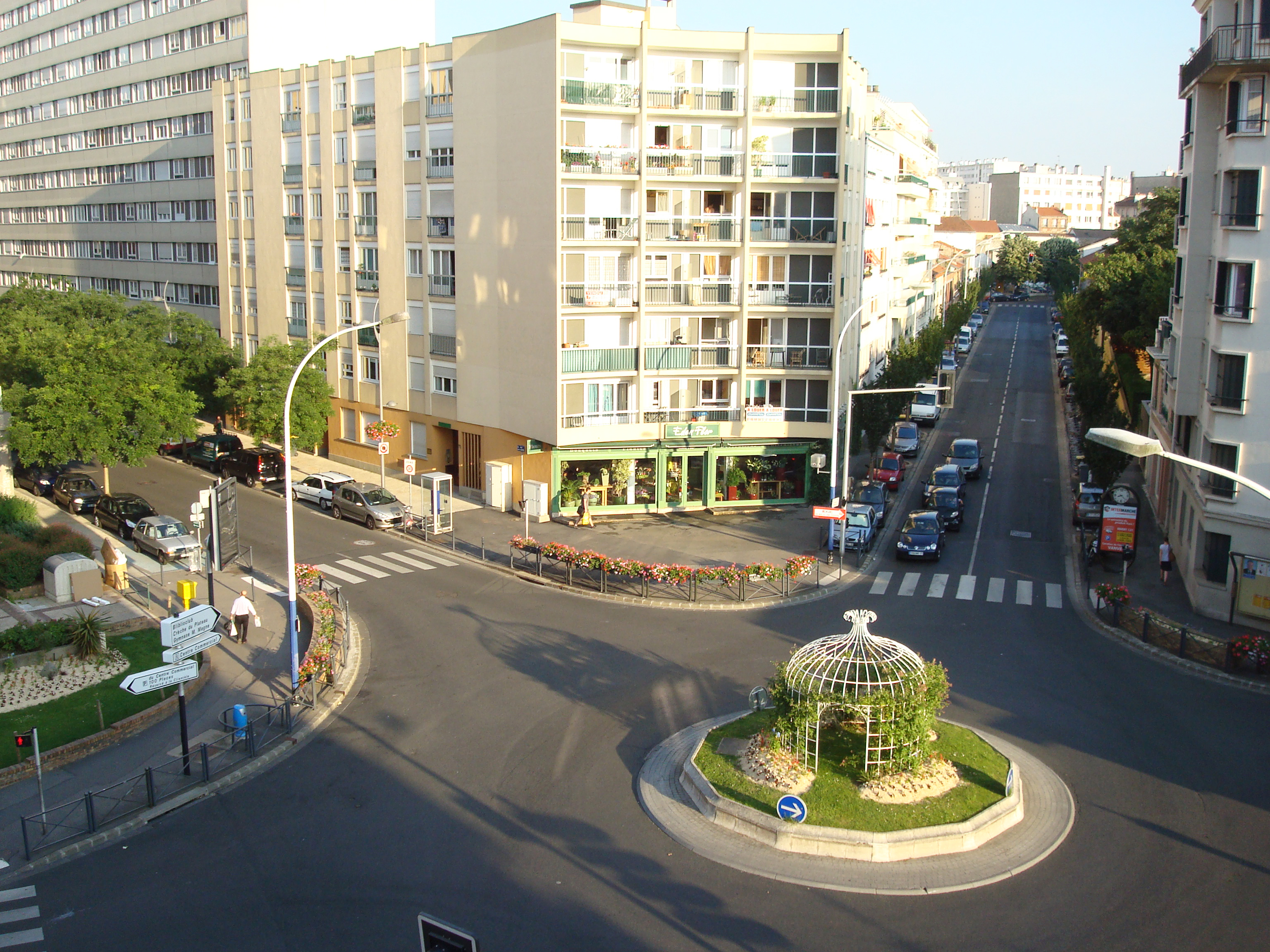
- The Albert-Legris crossroads, in the heart of the Plateau de Vanves district

- Coat of arms

- Location (in red) within Paris inner suburbs
- Location of Vanves
- Location within France Location within Île-de-France (region)
- Coordinates: 48°49′15″N 2°17′23″E
- Country: France
- Region: Île-de-France
- Department: Hauts-de-Seine
- Arrondissement: Boulogne-Billancourt
- Canton: Clamart
- Intercommunality: Grand Paris

Government
  - Mayor (2026–32): Bernard Gauducheau
- Area^{1}: 1.56 km^{2} (0.60 sq mi)
- Highest elevation: 78 m (256 ft)
- Lowest elevation: 35 m (115 ft)
- Population (2023): 28,622
  - Density: 18,300/km^{2} (47,500/sq mi)
- Time zone: UTC+01:00 (CET)
  - Summer (DST): UTC+02:00 (CEST)
- INSEE/Postal code: 92075 /92170
- ^{1} French Land Register data, which excludes lakes, ponds, glaciers > 1 km^{2} (0.386 sq mi or 247 acres) and river estuaries.

Vanves (French pronunciation: [vɑ̃v]) is a commune in the southwestern suburbs of Paris, France. It is located 5.6 km (3.5 mi) from the centre of Paris. It is one of the most densely populated municipalities in Europe and the tenth in France.

== History ==
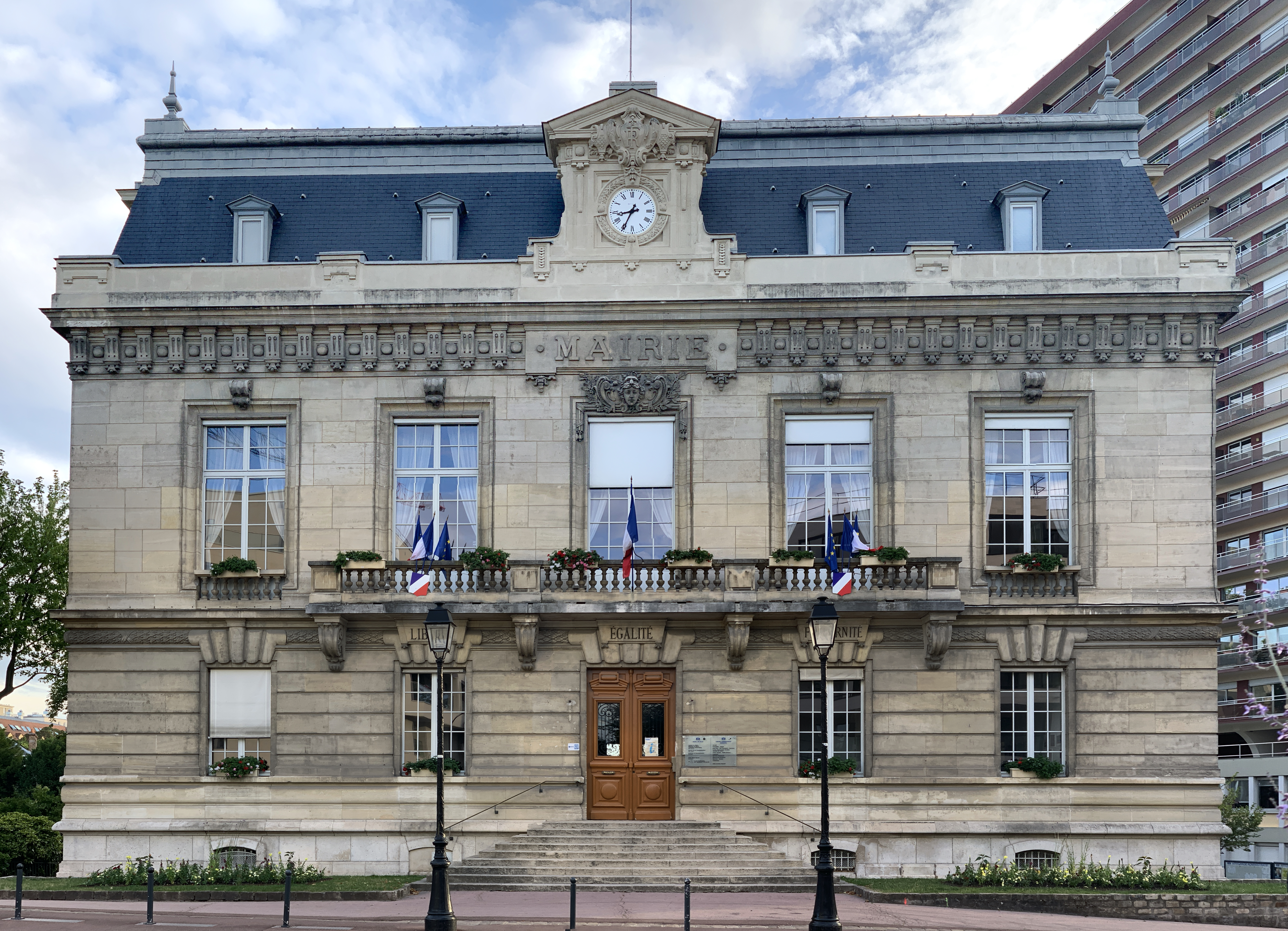
The Hôtel de Ville

On 1 January 1860, the city of Paris was enlarged by annexing neighboring communes. On that occasion, about a third of the commune of Vanves was annexed to Paris, and forms now essentially the neighborhood of Plaisance, in the 14th arrondissement of Paris.

On 8 November 1883, about half of the territory of Vanves was detached and became the commune of Malakoff.

The Hôtel de Ville was completed in 1898.

== Population ==
Historical population

| Year | Pop. | ±% p.a. |
|---|---|---|
| 1793 | 1,600 | — |
| 1800 | 1,297 | −2.95% |
| 1806 | 1,620 | +3.78% |
| 1821 | 1,909 | +1.10% |
| 1831 | 2,398 | +2.31% |
| 1836 | 2,427 | +0.24% |
| 1841 | 2,506 | +0.64% |
| 1846 | 2,646 | +1.09% |
| 1851 | 3,019 | +2.67% |
| 1856 | 3,783 | +4.62% |
| 1861 | 6,016 | +9.72% |
| 1866 | 8,511 | +7.19% |
| 1872 | 7,926 | −1.18% |
| 1876 | 8,812 | +2.68% |
| 1881 | 12,005 | +6.38% |
| 1886 | 5,936 | −13.14% |
| 1891 | 6,815 | +2.80% |
| 1896 | 8,741 | +5.10% |
| 1901 | 10,915 | +4.54% |

| Year | Pop. | ±% p.a. |
|---|---|---|
| 1906 | 12,265 | +2.36% |
| 1911 | 15,545 | +4.85% |
| 1921 | 16,936 | +0.86% |
| 1926 | 16,514 | −0.50% |
| 1931 | 19,450 | +3.33% |
| 1936 | 20,157 | +0.72% |
| 1946 | 20,678 | +0.26% |
| 1954 | 21,743 | +0.63% |
| 1962 | 25,585 | +2.05% |
| 1968 | 25,138 | −0.29% |
| 1975 | 22,528 | −1.55% |
| 1982 | 22,868 | +0.21% |
| 1990 | 25,967 | +1.60% |
| 1999 | 25,414 | −0.24% |
| 2007 | 26,886 | +0.71% |
| 2012 | 27,367 | +0.36% |
| 2017 | 27,729 | +0.26% |
| 2023 | 28,622 | +0.53% |

Source: EHESS and INSEE (1968-2023)

== Transport ==
Vanves is served by Malakoff – Plateau de Vanves station on Paris Métro Line 13. This station is located at the border between the commune of Vanves and the commune of Malakoff, on the Malakoff side of the border.

Vanves is also served by Vanves–Malakoff station on the Transilien Paris-Montparnasse suburban rail line.

== Education ==
Preschools/nurseries:

- École maternelle Cabourg
- École maternelle Forestier
- École maternelle Gambetta
- École maternelle Lemel
- École maternelle Marceau
- École maternelle du Parc

Elementary schools:

- École élémentaire Cabourg
- École élémentaire Forestier
- École élémentaire Gambetta
- École élémentaire Larmeroux
- École élémentaire Marceau
- École élémentaire du Parc

Junior high schools:

- Collège Michelet
- Collège Saint-Exupéry

Senior high schools/sixth form colleges:

- Lycée Michelet
- Lycée professionnel Louis Dardenne

== Twin towns – sister cities ==
Vanves is twinned with:

- Ballymoney, Northern Ireland, United Kingdom (since 2000)
- Lehrte, Germany (since 1963)
- Rosh HaAyin, Israel (since 2009)

== Notable people ==
- Jacques Jubé (1674–1745), priest, teacher and memoirist
- Bonawentura Niemojowski (1787–1835), Polish politician, lived here
- Marina Tsvetaeva (1892–1941), Russian poet and writer, lived here
- Albert Gazier (1908–1997), politician, died here
- Guy Môquet (1924–1941), member of the Resistance and martyr, lived here
- André du Bouchet (1924–2001), poet, lived here
- Gérard Jouannest (1933–2018), pianist and composer
- Marie-José Pérec (born 1968), track athlete, lived here
- Jérôme Rothen (born 1978), footballer, lived here

== See also ==
- Communes of the Hauts-de-Seine department
