= Gaîté station =

Metro station in Paris, France

Gaîté Joséphine Baker
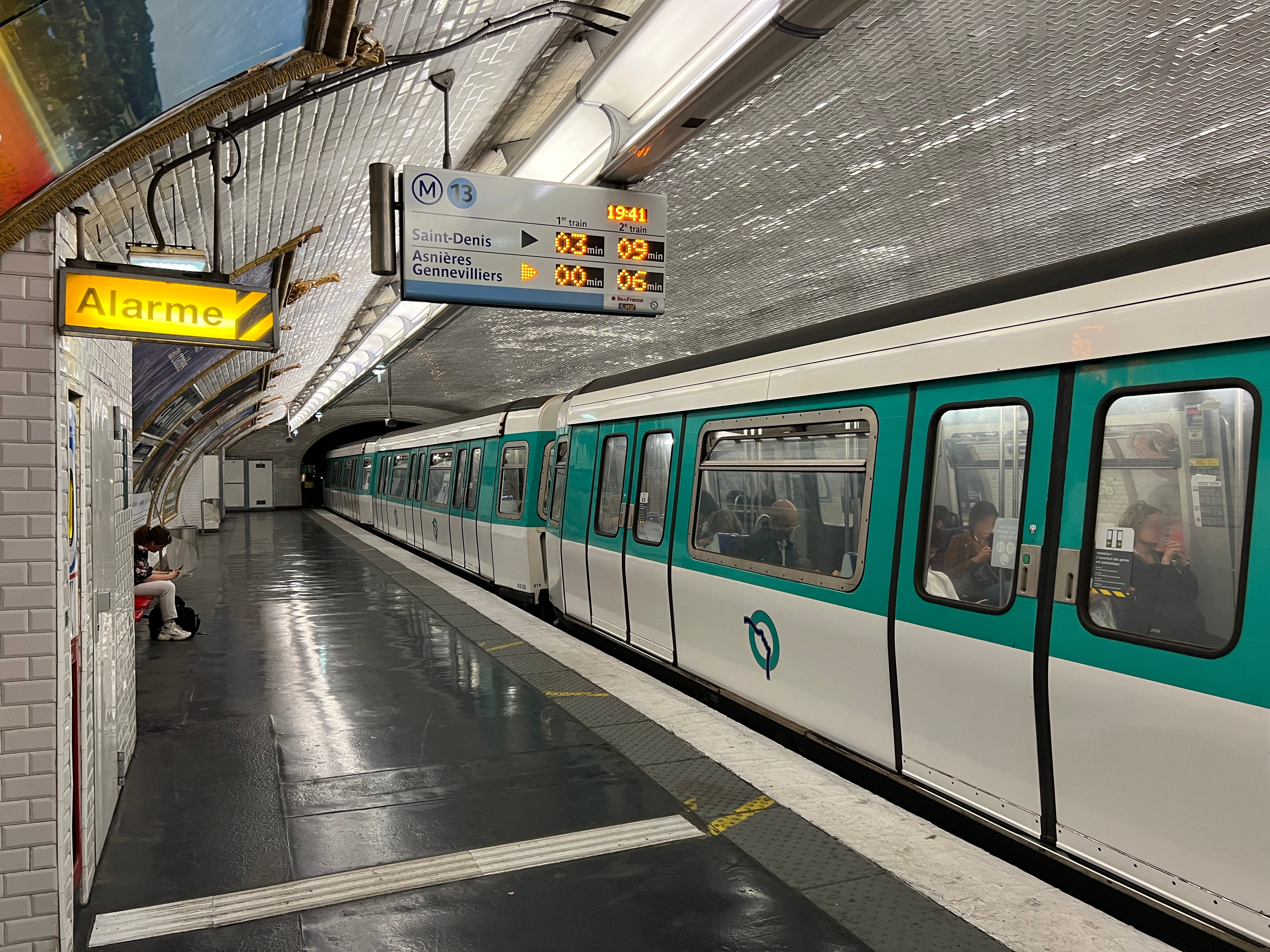
- MF 77 at Gaîté

General information
- Location: Avenue du Maine; 14th arrondissement of Paris; Île-de-France; France
- Coordinates: 48°50′19″N 2°19′21″E
- System: Paris Métro station
- Owner: RATP
- Operator: RATP
- Line: Paris Metro Paris Metro Line 13
- Platforms: 2 (2 side platforms)
- Tracks: 2

Construction
- Accessible: no

Other information
- Station code: 04-04
- Fare zone: 1

History
- Opened: 21 January 1937

Passengers
- 1,644,148 (2021)

Services
| Preceding station | Paris Metro | Following station |
|---|---|---|
| Pernety towards Châtillon–Montrouge | Line 13 | Montparnasse–Bienvenüe towards Les Courtilles or Saint-Denis–Université |
Location
- Location within Paris

Gaîté (French pronunciation: [ɡɛte]) is a station on Line 13 of the Paris Métro in the 14th arrondissement.

The station is named after the nearby rue de la Gaîté, which was a country road connecting Clamart with the Barrière du Montparnasse, a gate in the Wall of the Farmers-General at the intersection of the Boulevard Edgar-Quinet and the rue du Montparnasse (the location of Edgar Quinet métro station). It was built between 1784 and 1791 by the Ferme générale, the corporation of tax farmers, to enforce the collection of taxes of goods, including wine, that were imported into Paris. Guinguettes, restaurants, and theatres were built outside the wall to avoid these taxes. "Gaîté" is an old French spelling of "gaiety", reflecting this trade.

== History ==
The station opened on 21 January 1937 as part of the initial section of the old line 14 between Porte de Vanves and Bienvenüe (today known as Montparnasse–Bienvenue). On 9 November 1976, the old line 14 was incorporated into line 13 following the latter's extension in successive phases from Saint-Lazare.

As part of the "Un métro + beau" programme by the RATP, the station's corridors and platform lighting were renovated and modernised on 15 July 2001.

In 2019, the station was used by 2,713,799 passengers, making it the 193rd busiest of the Métro network out of 302 stations.

In 2020, the station was used by 1,205,958 passengers amidst the COVID-19 pandemic, making it the 214th busiest of the Métro network out of 304 stations.

In 2021, the station was used by 1,644,148 passengers, making it the 216th busiest of the Métro network out of 304 stations.

On 30 November 2021, the station was renamed "Gaîté - Joséphine Baker", after Joséphine Baker (1906-1975), an American-born French entertainer and spy during World War II as part of the French resistance, the day she was inducted into the Pantheon. She is the first Black woman to be honoured there, with her body remaining in Monaco. This follows the wish of the President for a métro station to be named after her. The station is located next to Bobino, a famous theatre where she held her last performance on 9 April 1975, a few days before her death. Place Joséphine-Baker, located at the end of rue de la Gaîté, was also named after her back in 25 September 2000. It is one of the few métro stations to have been named after a woman, after Bagneux–Lucie Aubrac, Barbara, Barbès–Rochechouart, Boucicaut, Chardon Lagache, Europe, Louise Michel, Madeleine, and Pierre et Marie Curie.

On 27 April 2023, two people died at the station after voluntarily going down to the tracks at around 12:45 am. They were hit by an incoming train while attempting to get back onto the platforms. This came five days after another accident on the métro at Bel-Air (on line 6) that resulted in the death of a woman when the train departed the platform with her jacket caught between the doors as she was alighting.

== Passenger services ==
=== Access ===
The station has 5 accesses:

- Access 1: rue Vercingétorix Hôpital Léopold Bellan
- Access 2: Centre Commercial
- Access 3: avenue du Maine
- Access 4: rue Vandamme
- Access 5: rue de la Gaîté Les Théâtres

=== Station layout ===
Street Level
| B1 | Mezzanine |
| Platform level | Side platform, doors will open on the right |
| Platform level | Northbound | ← toward Les Courtilles or Saint-Denis - Université (Montparnasse–Bienvenüe) |
| Platform level | Southbound | toward Châtillon–Montrouge (Pernety) → |
| Platform level | Side platform, doors will open on the right |

=== Platforms ===
The station has a standard configuration with 2 tracks surrounded by 2 side platforms.

=== Other connections ===
The station is also served by lines 58, 59, 88, and 92, of the RATP bus network, and at night, by line N63 of the Noctilien bus network.

== Nearby ==
- Montparnasse Cemetery

== Gallery ==
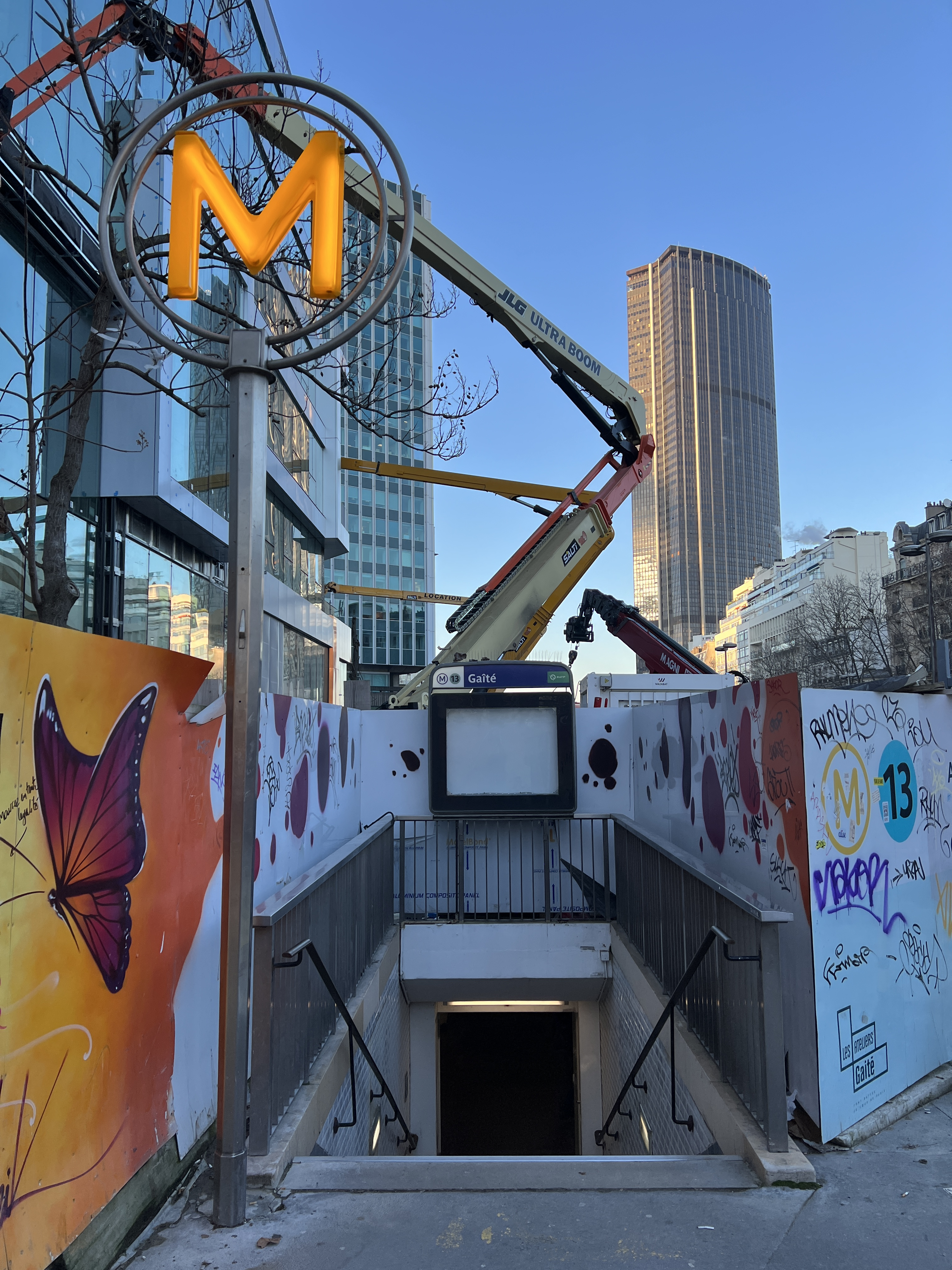
Access 1

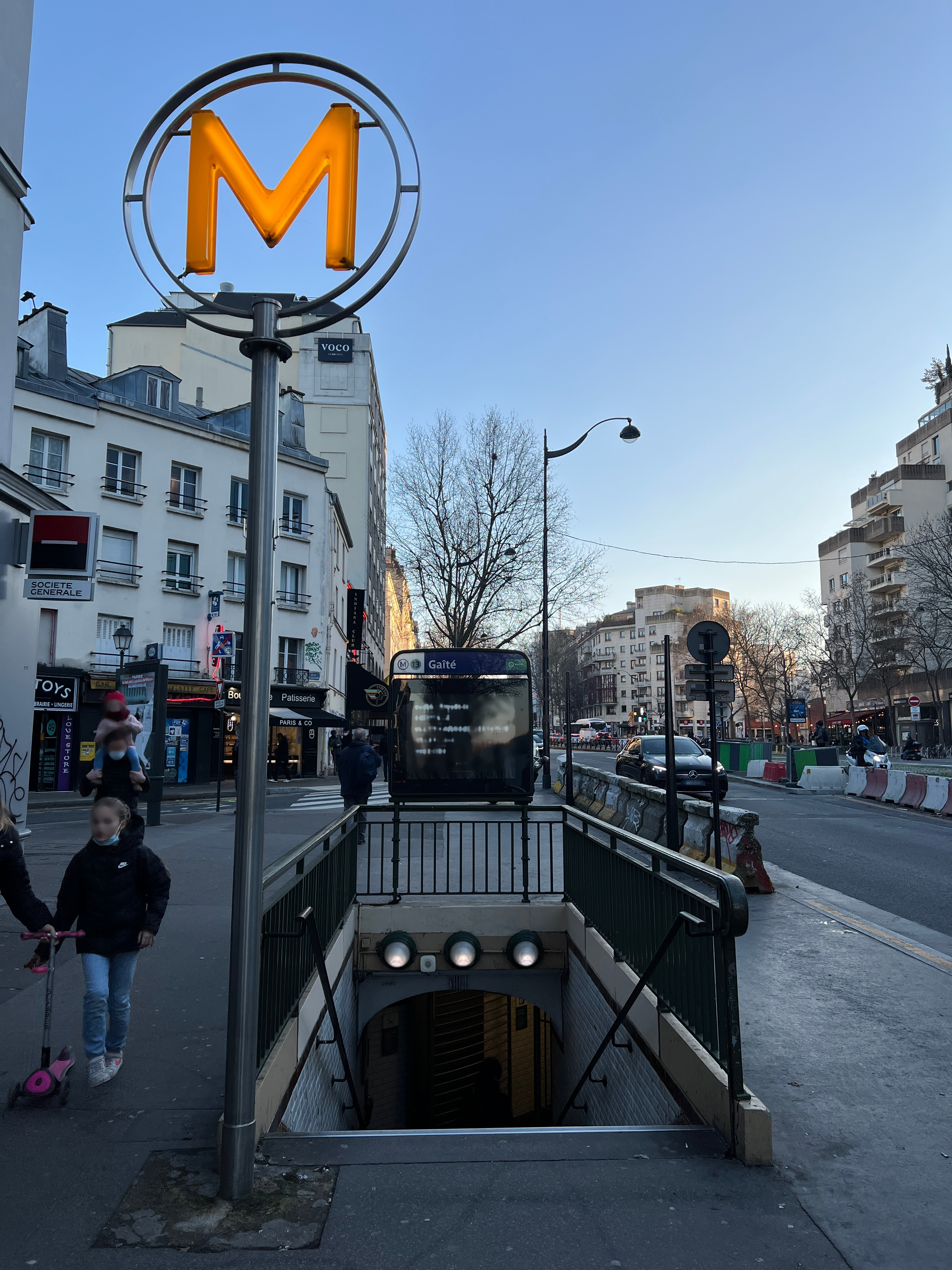
Access 4

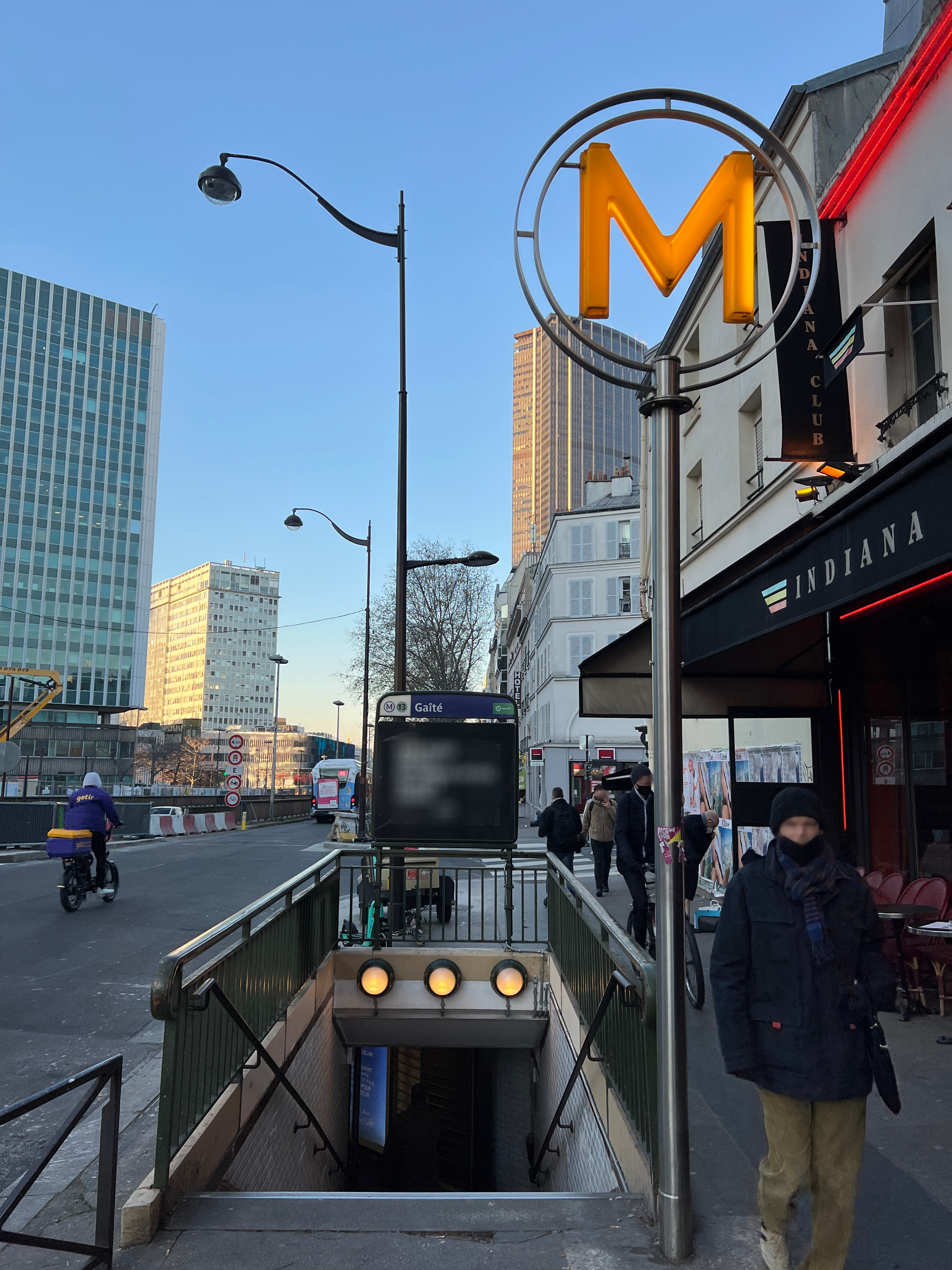
Access 5

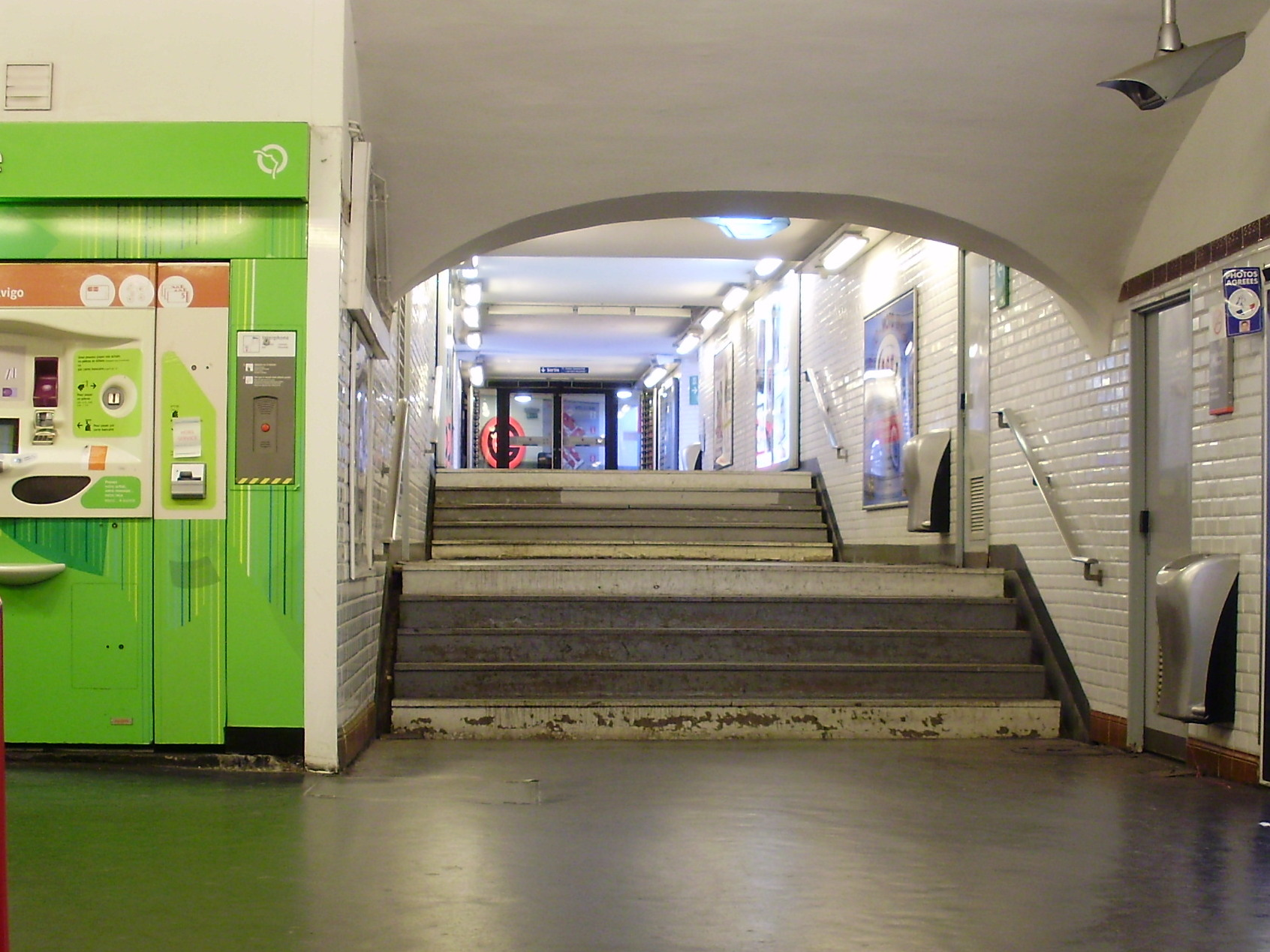
Corridor under avenue du Maine leading to the centre commercial (a shopping centre)
