= Pernety =

Pernety may refer to:

- Pernety station, a Paris Metro station
- Pernety (surname)
