= Plaisance station =

Metro station in Paris, France

Plaisance
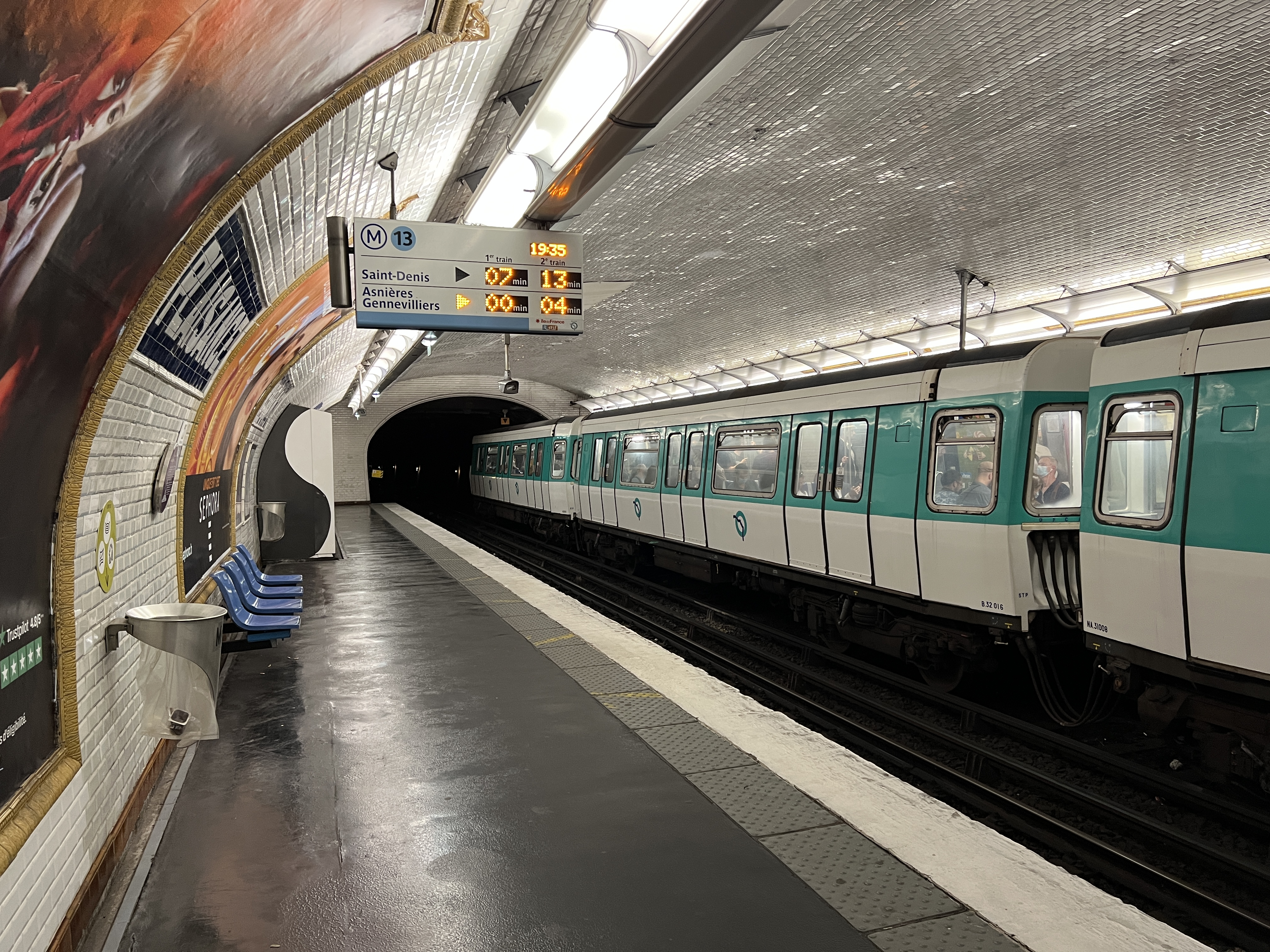
- MF 77 at Plaisance

General information
- Location: Rue d'Alésia; 14th arrondissement of Paris; Île-de-France; France
- Coordinates: 48°49′54″N 2°18′49″E
- System: Paris Métro station
- Owner: RATP
- Operator: RATP
- Line: Paris Metro Paris Metro Line 13
- Platforms: 2 (2 side platforms)
- Tracks: 2

Construction
- Accessible: no

Other information
- Station code: 0403
- Fare zone: 1

History
- Opened: 21 January 1937

Passengers
- 3,521,753 (2021)

Services
Preceding station	Paris Metro	Following station
Porte de Vanves towards Châtillon–Montrouge	Line 13	Pernety towards Les Courtilles or Saint-Denis–Université
Location
- Location within Paris

Plaisance (French pronunciation: [plɛzɑ̃s]) is a station on line Line 13 of the Paris Métro in the 14th arrondissement.

It is named after the Château du Maine which was built in the 17th century and possessed a large park. The word "plaisance" is equivalent to the English word "pleasance", that is a pleasure garden. It was purchased in 1842 by a surveyor called Couesnon whose son subdivided it, creating the district of Plaisance between 1858 and 1860, which became one of the largest slums in Paris. The Compagnie générale des omnibus (a major 19th century operator of horse-drawn omnibuses and later trams and motor buses) razed the castle to build garages.

== History ==
The station opened on 21 January 1937 as part of the initial section of the old line 14 between Porte de Vanves and Bienvenüe (today known as Montparnasse–Bienvenue). On 9 November 1976, the old line 14 was incorporated into line 13 following the latter's extension in successive phases from Saint-Lazare.

As part of the "Un métro + beau" programme by the RATP, the station's corridors and platform lighting were renovated and modernised on 8 November 2002.

On 24 December 2018, a woman committed suicide at the station, interrupting traffic on the line between Montparnasse-Bienvenüe and Châtillon–Montrouge for over two hours in the evening.

In 2019, the station was used by 4,784,211 passengers, making it the 87th busiest of the Métro network out of 302 stations.

In 2020, the station was used by 2,590,236 passengers amidst the COVID-19 pandemic, making it the 79th busiest of the Métro network out of 304 stations.

In 2021, the station was used by 3,521,753 passengers, making it the 76th busiest of the Métro network out of 304 stations.

== Passenger services ==
=== Access ===
The station has five accesses:

- Access 1: rue des Suisses
- Access 2: rue d'Alésia
- Access 3: rue Decrès
- Access 4: Square
- Access 5: rue Raymond Losserand Hôpitaux (an ascending escalator)

=== Station layout ===
Street Level
B1	Mezzanine
Platform level	Side platform, doors will open on the right
Platform level	Northbound	← toward Les Courtilles or Saint-Denis–Université (Pernety)
Platform level	Southbound	toward Châtillon – Montrouge (Porte de Vanves) →
Platform level	Side platform, doors will open on the right

=== Platforms ===
The station has a standard configuration with 2 tracks surrounded by 2 side platforms. The lower portion of the side walls are vertical instead of elliptical due to the narrower width of the road it lies beneath.

=== Other connections ===
The station is also served by lines 59 and 62 of the RATP bus network, and at night, by line N63 of the Noctilien bus network.

== Nearby ==
- Hôpital Saint-Joseph
- Impasse Florimont, where Georges Brassens (1921-1981) lived from 1944 to 1966
- Jardin Chérifa
- Jardin de la Place-Louise-Losserand
- Square Frédéric-Bazille
- Square Henri-et-Achille-Duchêne
- Square du Père-Plumier

== Gallery ==
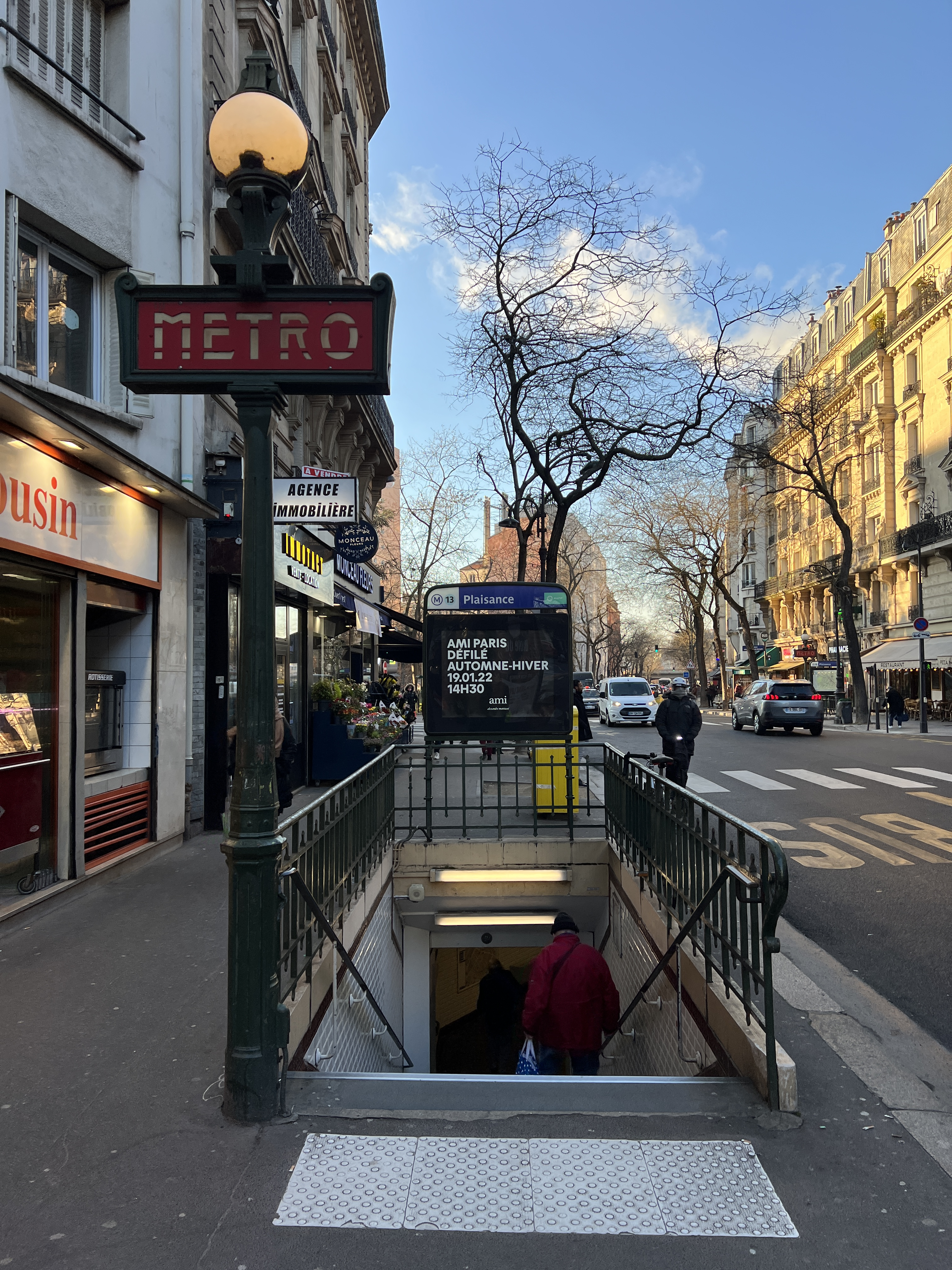
Access 1

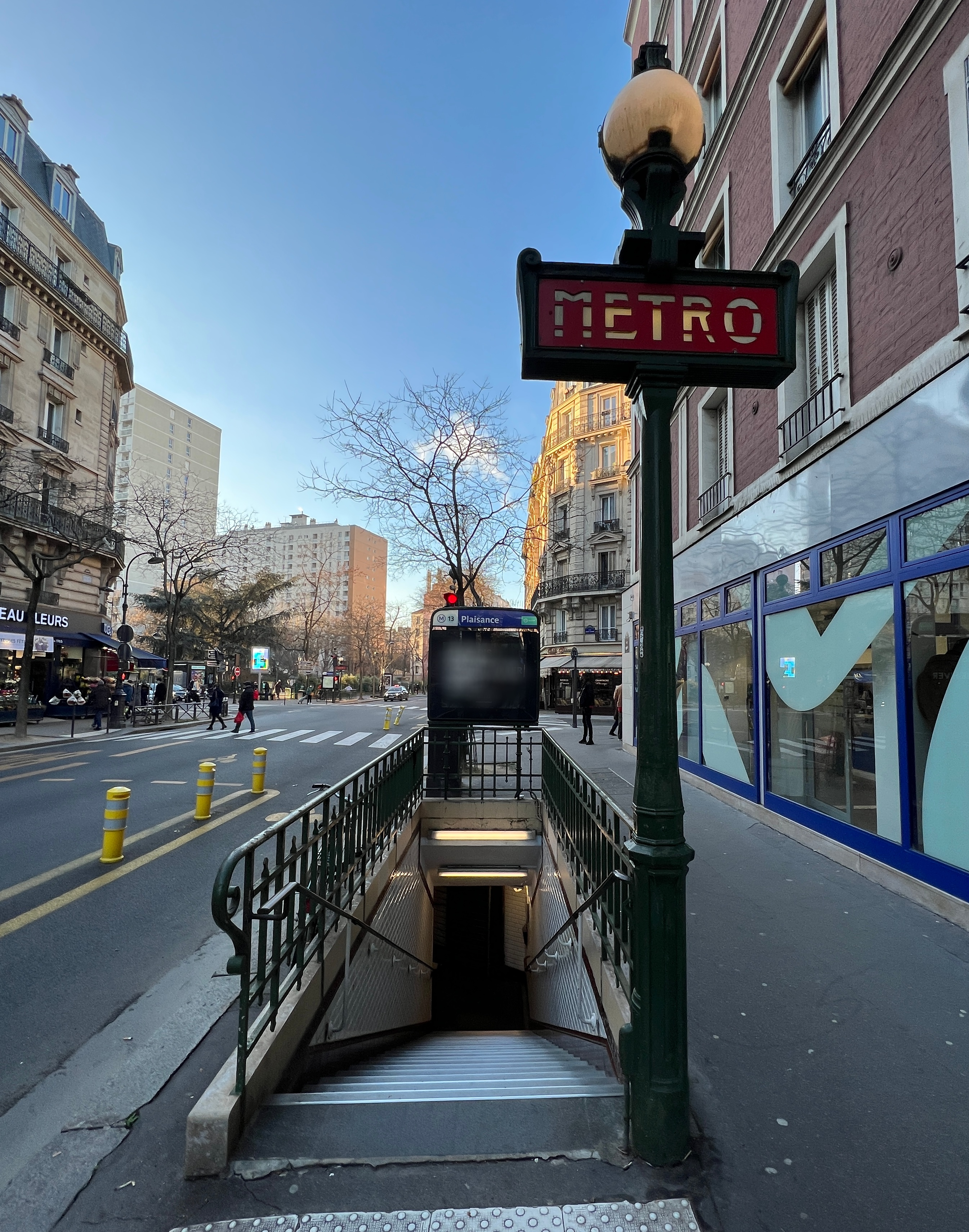
Access 2

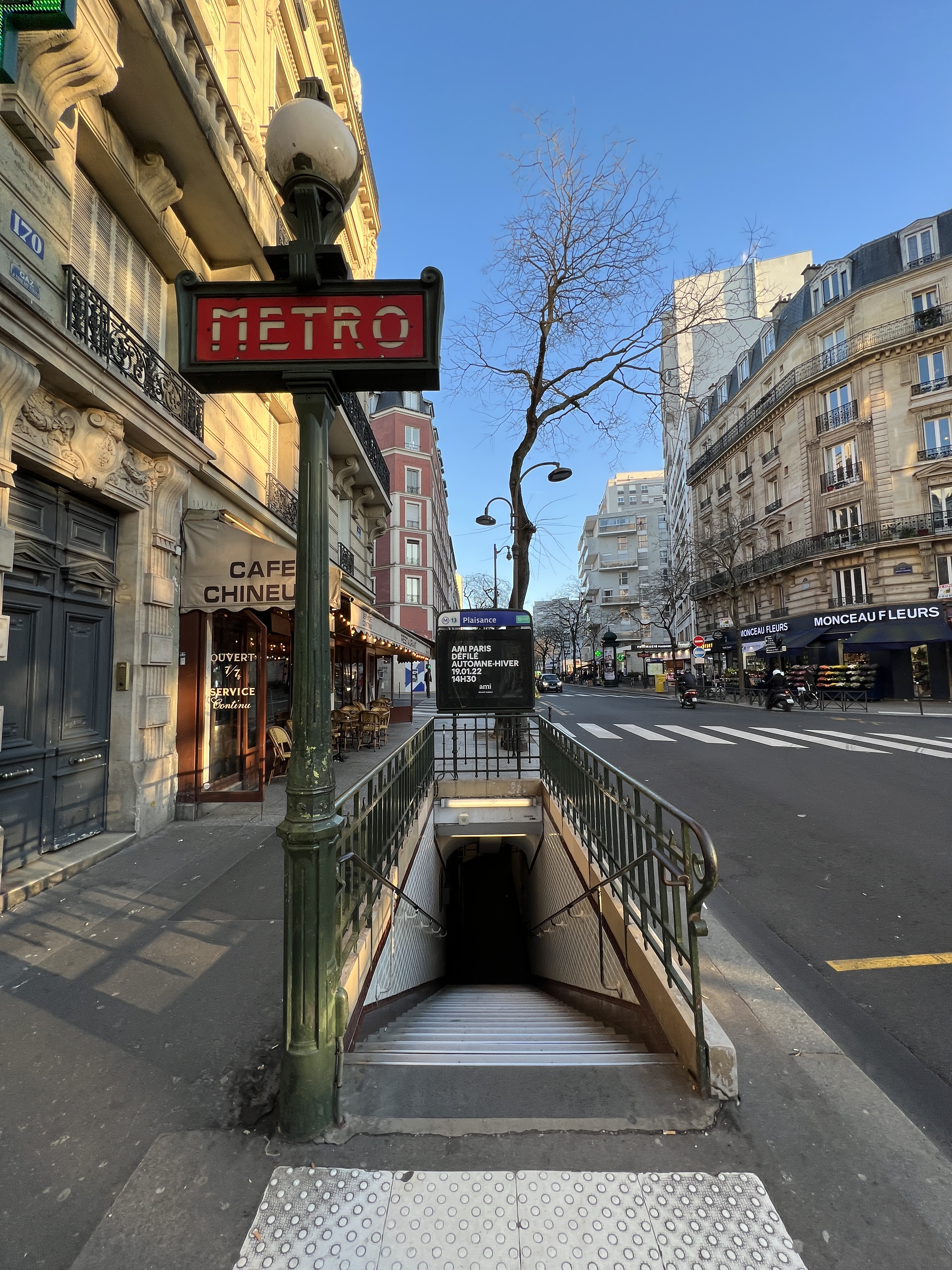
Access 3

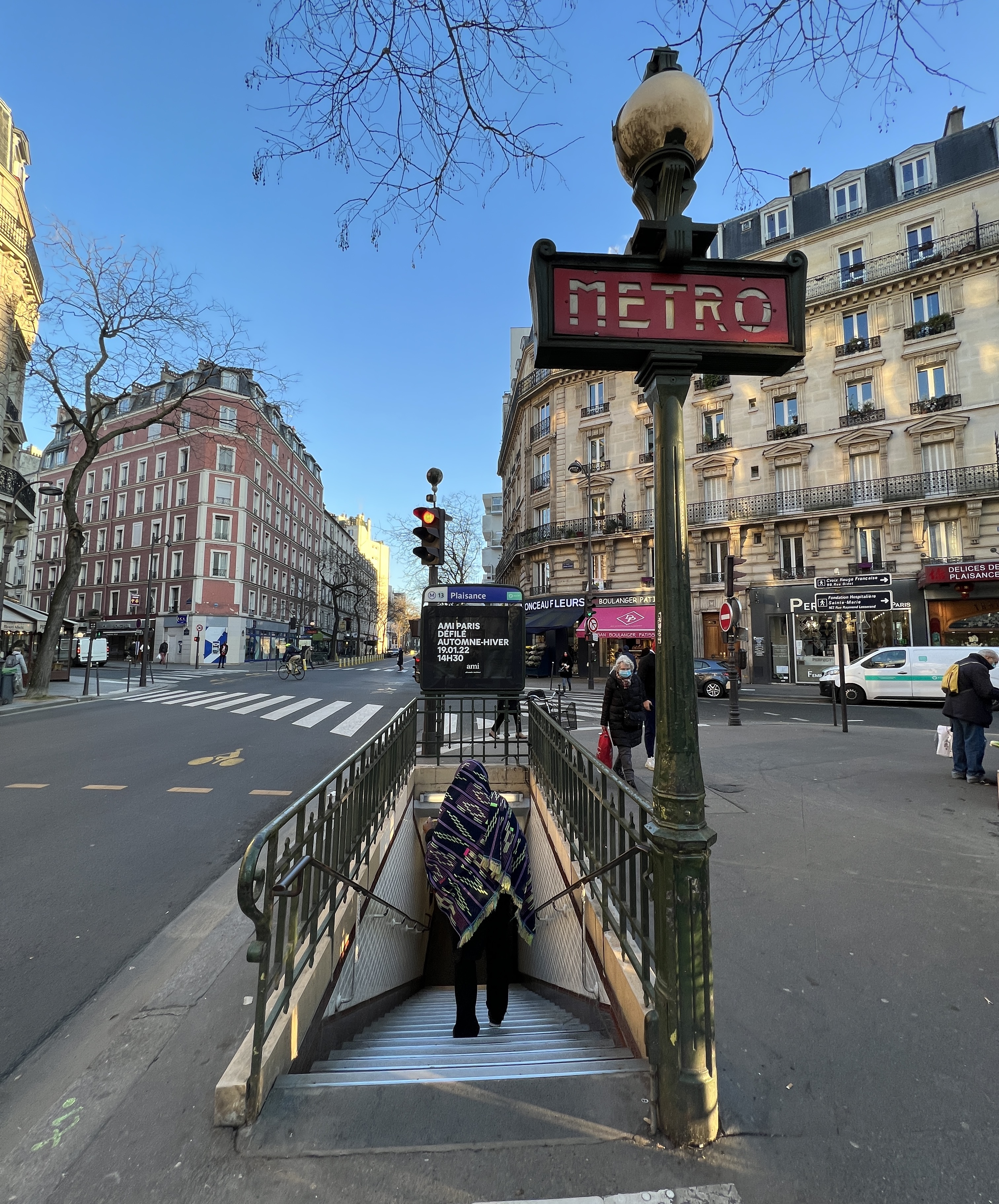
Access 4

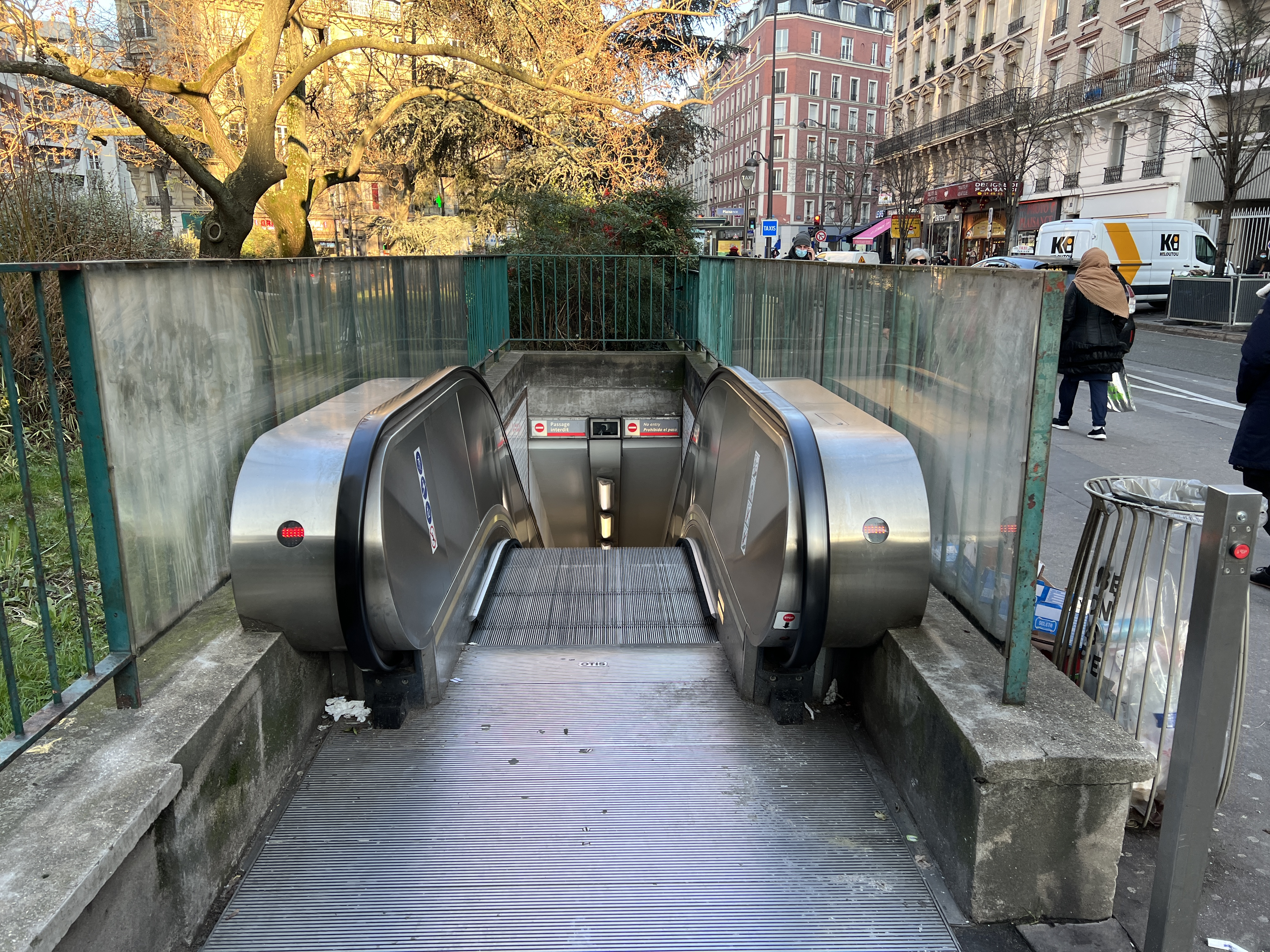
Access 5
