= Pernety station =

Metro station in Paris, France

Pernety
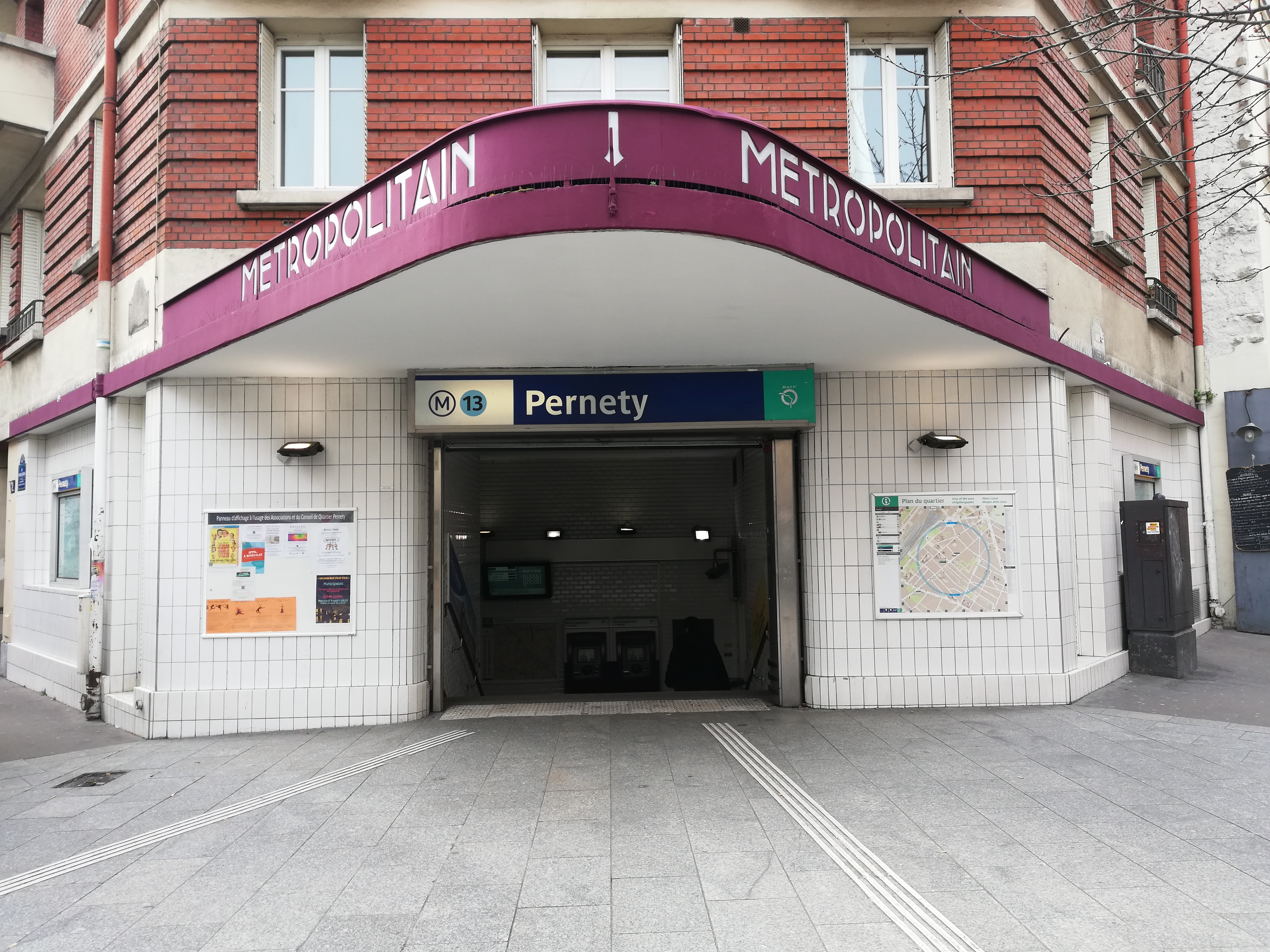
- Access 1

General information
- Location: Rue Raymond-Losserand; 14th arrondissement of Paris; Île-de-France; France
- Coordinates: 48°50′03″N 2°19′07″E
- System: Paris Métro station
- Owner: RATP
- Operator: RATP
- Line: Paris Metro Paris Metro Line 13
- Platforms: 2 (2 side platforms)
- Tracks: 2

Construction
- Accessible: no

Other information
- Station code: 0402
- Fare zone: 1

History
- Opened: 21 January 1937

Passengers
- 2,173,567 (2021)

Services
Preceding station	Paris Metro	Following station
Plaisance towards Châtillon–Montrouge	Line 13	Gaîté towards Les Courtilles or Saint-Denis–Université
Location
- Location within Paris

Pernety (French: [pɛʁnɛti]) is a station on line Line 13 of the Paris Métro in the 14th arrondissement.

It is named after the nearby rue Pernety, named after Viscount Joseph Marie de Pernety (1766–1856), one of Napoleon's generals and a local landowner where the street was built.

== History ==
The station opened on 21 January 1937 as part of the initial section of the old line 14 between Porte de Vanves and Bienvenüe (today known as Montparnasse–Bienvenue). On 9 November 1976, the old line 14 was incorporated into line 13 following the latter's extension in successive phases from Saint-Lazare.

As part of the "Un métro + beau" programme by the RATP, the station's corridors and platform lighting were renovated and modernised during the 2000s.

In 2019, the station was used by 3,050,541 passengers, making it the 167th busiest of the Métro network out of 302 stations.

In 2020, the station was used by 1,395,770 passengers amidst the COVID-19 pandemic, making it the 185th busiest of the Métro network out of 304 stations.

In 2021, the station was used by 2,173,567 passengers, making it the 162nd busiest of the Métro network out of 304 stations.

== Passenger services ==
=== Access ===
The station has two accesses:

- Access 1: rue Pernety
- Access 2: rue Niepce (an ascending escalator)

=== Station layout ===
Street Level
B1	Mezzanine
Platform level	Side platform, doors will open on the right
Platform level	Northbound	← toward Les Courtilles or Saint-Denis - Université (Gaîté)
Platform level	Southbound	toward Châtillon – Montrouge (Plaisance) →
Platform level	Side platform, doors will open on the right

=== Platforms ===
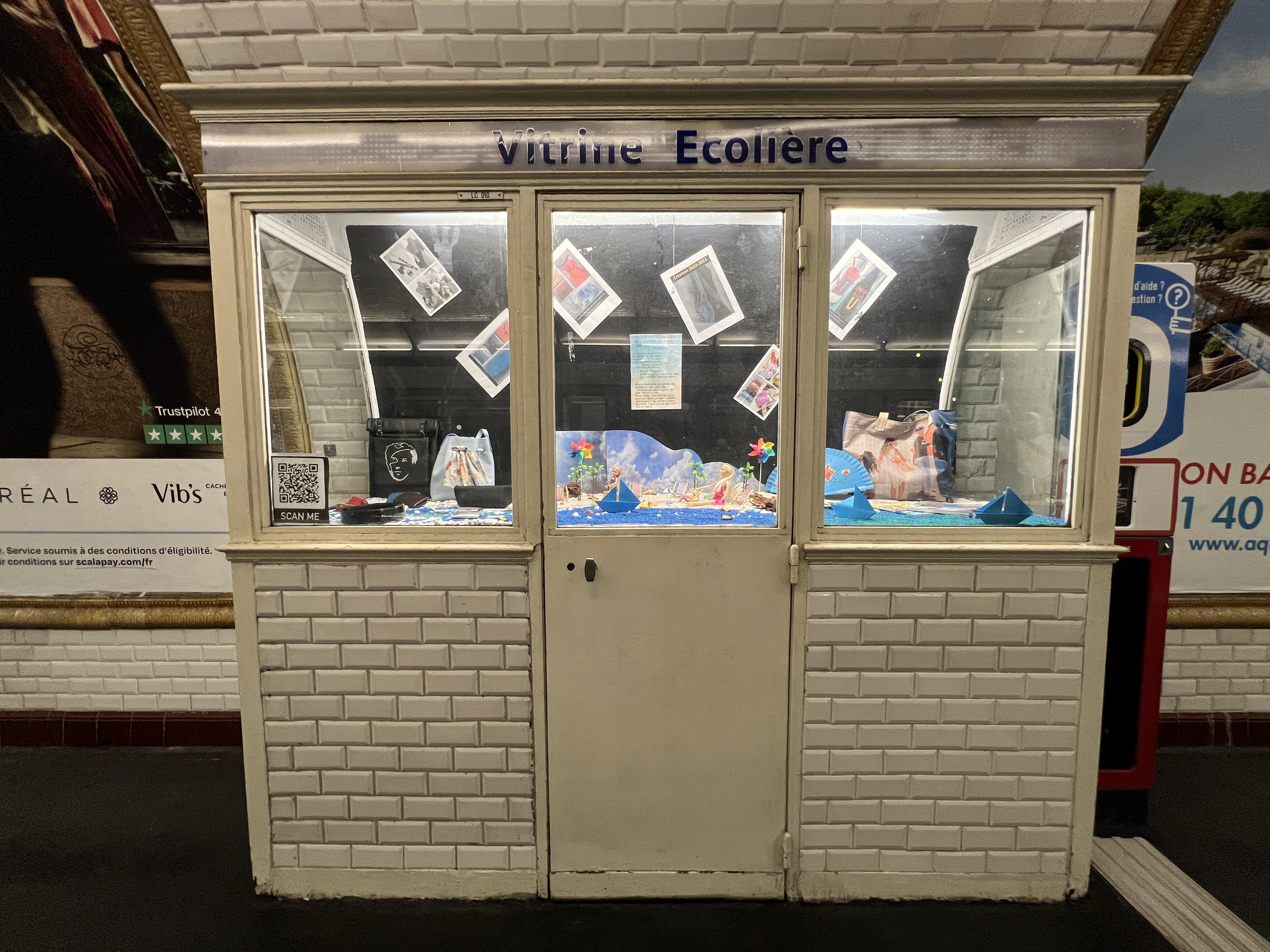
Vitrine Ecolière

The station has a standard configuration with 2 tracks surrounded by 2 side platforms. The lower portion of the side walls are vertical instead of elliptical due to the narrower width of the road it lies beneath.

On the platform towards Les Courtilles or Saint-Denis - Université, the former station manager's office has been turned into a small exhibition, Vitrine Ecolière, by students from EREA Croce Spinelli, a local vocational school. It serves as an opportunity to introduce students to merchandising through applied arts and sales, putting into use their training to develop various showcases in a simultated shop window. The showcase changes depending on the holidays throughout the year, such as Halloween, Christmas, Easter, Valentine's Day, Mother's Day, amongst others.

=== Other connections ===
The station is also served by line 59 of the RATP bus network, and at night, by line N63 of the Noctilien bus network.

== Nearby ==
- Église Notre-Dame-du-Travail de Paris
- Jardin des Colonnes - Ricardo-Bofill
- Jardin du Cloître
- Jardin Françoise-Héritier
- Square Alberto-Giacometti
- Square de l'Abbé-Lemire
- Square du Cardinal-Wyszynski
- Square du Chanoine-Viollet

== Culture ==
The station has been depicted in various films throughout the years (particularly its main access):

- Loulou, a French drama film by Maurice Pialat in 1980
- Night and Day, a Korean comedy-drama film by Hong Sang-soo in 2008
- Amitiés sincères, a French comedy-drama by Stéphan Archinard and François Prévôt-Leygonie in 2013
- PISTOLET ROSE, a song by Alpha Wann, had its music video filmed at Pernety

== Gallery ==
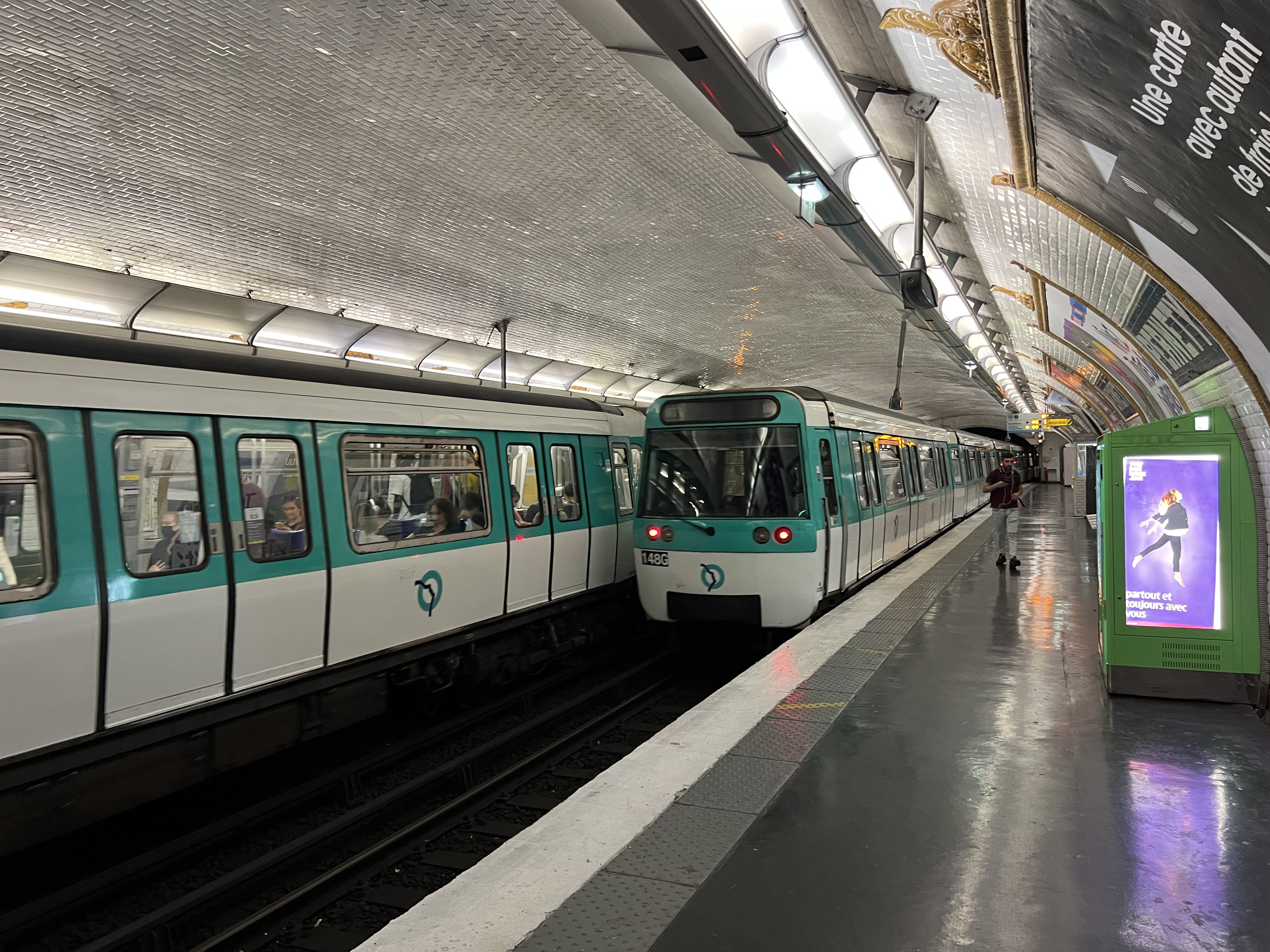
MF 77 at Pernety

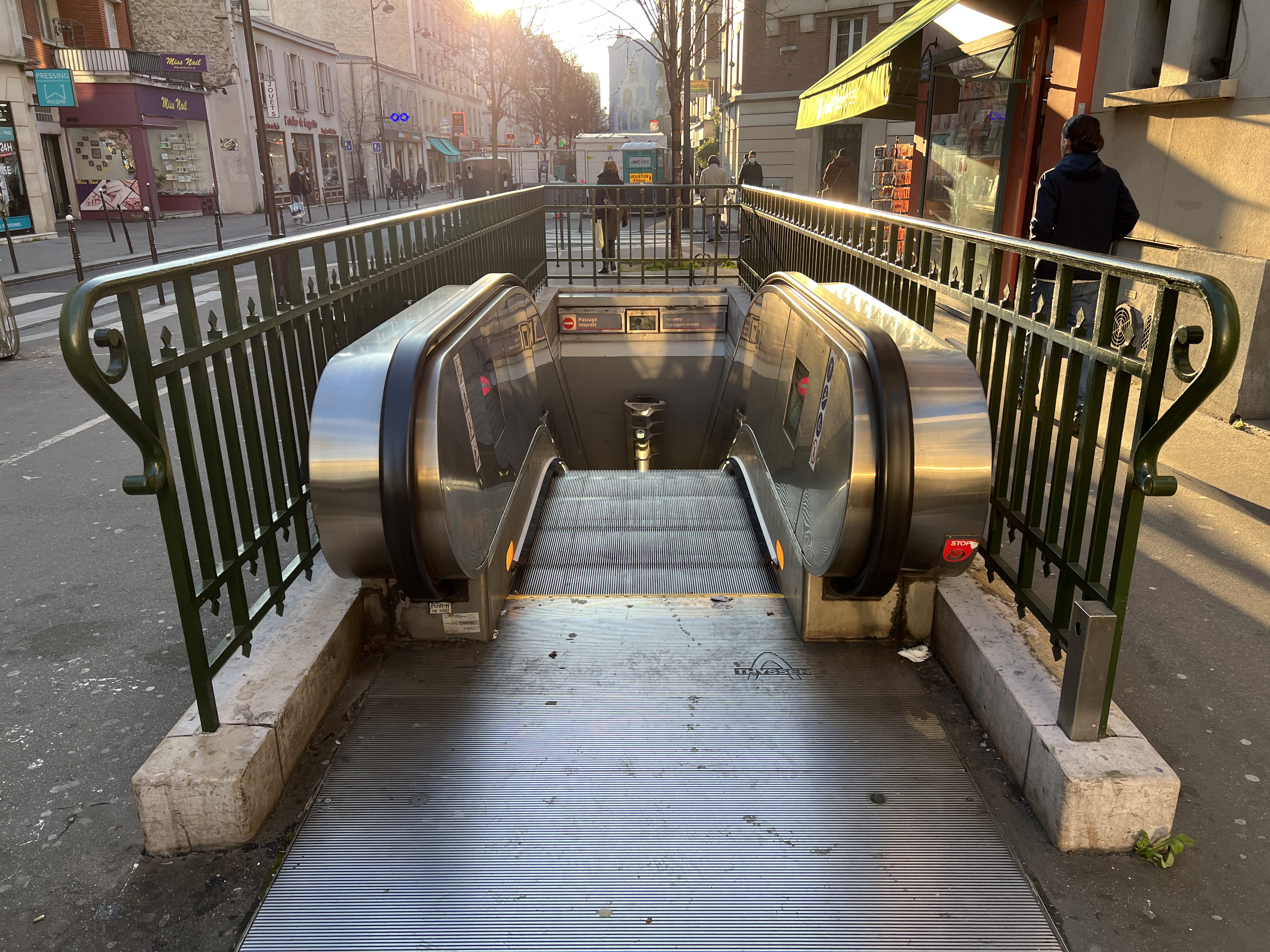
Access 2
