= Edgar Quinet station =

Metro station in Paris, France

Edgar Quinet
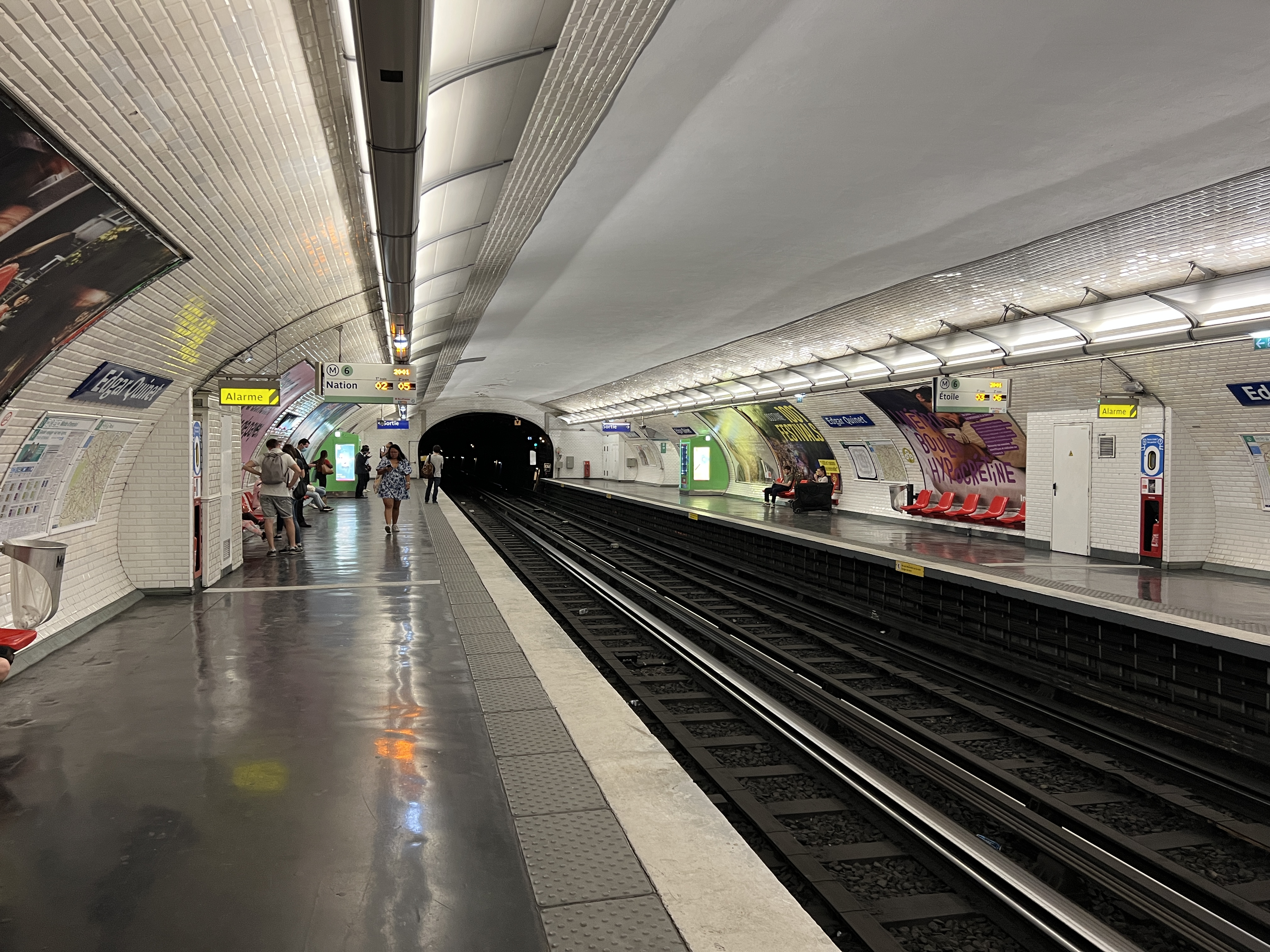
- View of the station

General information
- Location: Boulevard Edgar Quinet; 14th arrondissement of Paris; Île-de-France; France
- Coordinates: 48°50′28″N 2°19′30″E
- System: Paris Métro station
- Owner: RATP
- Operator: RATP
- Line: Paris Metro Paris Metro Line 6
- Platforms: 2 (side platforms)
- Tracks: 2

Construction
- Accessible: no

Other information
- Fare zone: 1

History
- Opened: 24 April 1906

Services
Preceding station	Paris Metro	Following station
Montparnasse–Bienvenüe towards Charles de Gaulle–Étoile	Line 6	Raspail towards Nation
Location
- Location within Paris

Edgar Quinet (French pronunciation: [ɛdɡaʁ kinɛ]) is a station on Line 6 of the Paris Métro. It is situated in the 14th arrondissement at the intersection of Boulevard Edgar Quinet, the Rue du Montparnasse and the Rue de la Gaîté.

== Location ==
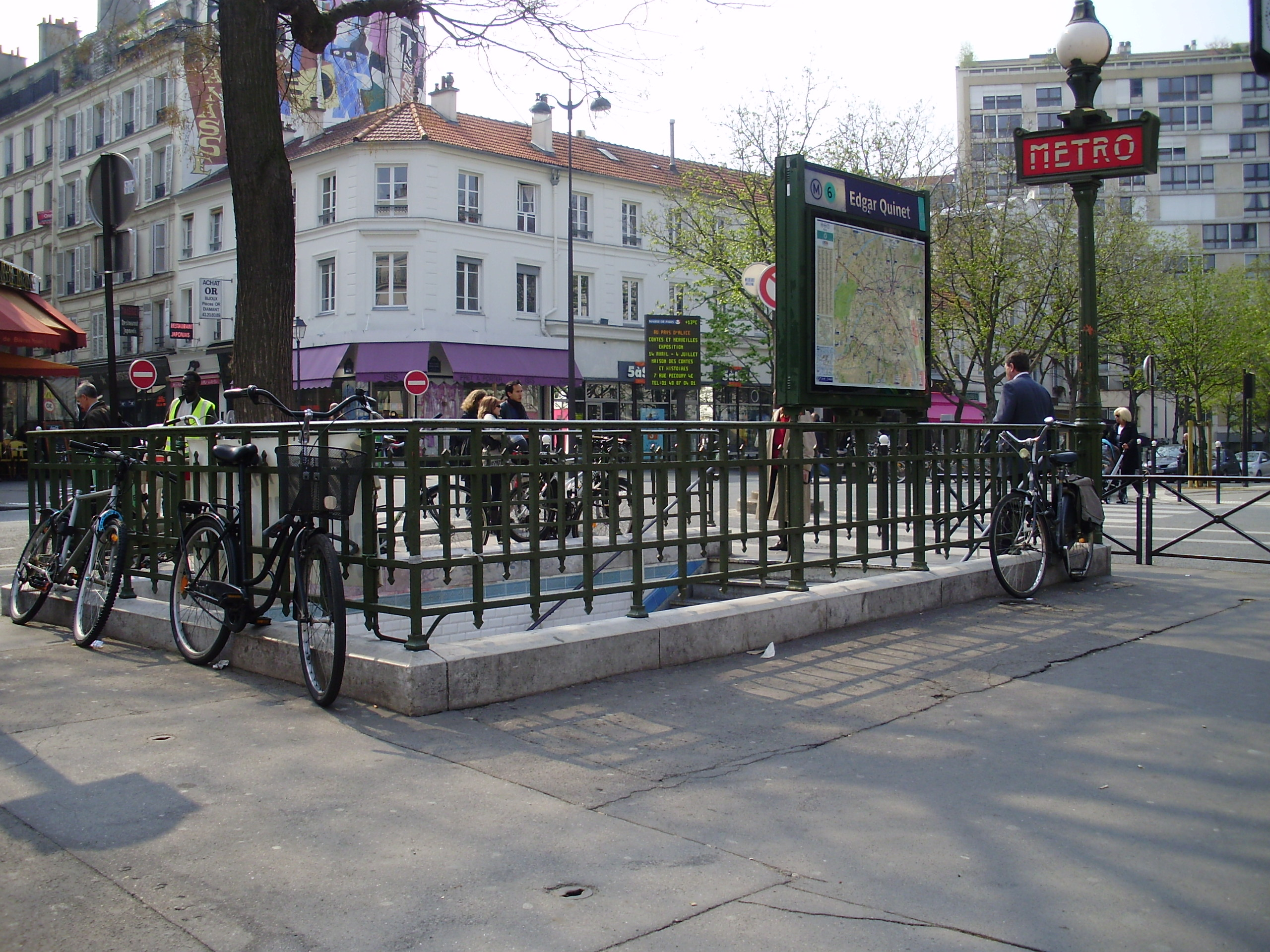
Station entrance

The metro station is located under Boulevard Edgar Quinet, east of the intersection with the streets of La Gaîté, d'Odessa, du Montparnasse and Delambre. Orientated approximately along an east-west axis, it is placed between the Montparnasse – Bienvenue and Raspail Metro stations.

== History ==
The station opened as part of the former Line 2 South on 24 April 1906, when it was extended from Passy to Place d'Italie. On 14 October 1907, Line 2 South was incorporated into Line 5. It was incorporated into Line 6 on 12 October 1942.

It is named after Boulevard Edgar Quinet, itself named after Edgar Quinet (1803–1875), a historian and intellectual who wrote on German history, Christianity and other subjects. The station was the location of the Barrière Montparnasse (known as the Barrière d'Arcueil during the French Revolution), a gate built for the collection of taxation as part of the Wall of the Farmers-General; the gate was built between 1784 and 1788 and demolished in the nineteenth century.

In 2018, 2,364,420 travellers entered the station, placing it at the 232nd position out of 302 Métro stations in terms of use.

== Passenger services ==
=== Access ===
The station has a single access called Boulevard Edgar-Quine, leading to the median-strip of that boulevard, right of the no. 11 facing the crossroads. Consisting of a fixed staircase, it is adorned with an Adolphe Dervaux candelabra.

=== Station layout ===
Street Level

B1	Mezzanine for platform connection

Platform level	Side platform, doors will open on the right
Platform level	toward Charles de Gaulle – Étoile	← toward Charles de Gaulle–Étoile (Montparnasse – Bienvenüe)
Platform level	toward Nation	toward Nation (Raspail) →
Platform level	Side platform, doors will open on the right

=== Platforms ===
Edgar Quinet is a standard configuration station. It has two platforms separated by metro tracks and the roof is elliptical. The decor is the style used for the majority of Métro stations. The lighting strips are white and rounded in the Gaudin style of the Metro revival of the 2000s; the bevelled white ceramic tiles cover the walls; tunnel exits and corridors outlets. The roof is painted white. Advertising frames are metallic, and the name of the station is written in a Parisine font on enamelled plates. The Motte style seats are red.

=== Bus connections ===
The station does not have a connection with the RATP Bus Network.

== Places of interest ==
Nearby are the districts of Montparnasse and Montparnasse Cemetery.
