= Pernety (surname) =

Pernety or de Pernety is a French surname. Notable people with the surname include:

- Antoine-Joseph Pernety (1716-1796), French writer and spiritualist
- Joseph Marie de Pernety (1766-1856), French general; see XI Corps (Grande Armée)
