= Paris Metro Line 14 (1937–1976) =

Former metro line

Line 14

Overview
- Termini: Invalides; Porte de Vanves
- Stations: 9

Service
- Type: Rapid transit
- System: Paris Metro
- Operator(s): CMP, later RATP

History
- Opened: 21 January 1937
- Closed: 9 November 1976

Technical
- Track gauge: 1,435 mm (4 ft 8 1/2 in)
- Conduction system: Conductor

Paris Metro Line 14 (planned as Line C; French: Ligne 14 du métro de Paris) was a line of the Paris Metro that existed from 1937 to 1976.

== History ==
Changes with the line's opening in 1937

Designed as Line C of the Nord-Sud Company—Line A being today's Line 12 and Line B being today's Line 13—before it went bankrupt in 1930, the project was taken over by the other company operating the Paris Metro: the Compagnie du chemin de fer métropolitain de Paris (CMP), which would become the Régie autonome des transports parisiens (RATP) in 1949.

The CMP subsequently started building Line 14 in 1933. In 1976, the line was incorporated into Line 13 with the opening of the extension between Invalides and Champs-Élysées–Clemenceau under the Seine, as Nord-Sud's original plan included a merger of Line B and Line C. The number 14 was reused for a new line that entered service in 1998 between Madeleine and Bibliothèque François Mitterrand.

== Chronology ==
- 21 January 1937: Line 14 was inaugurated between Bienvenüe and Porte de Vanves.
- 27 July 1937: The line was extended northbound from Bienvenüe to Duroc. The section between Invalides and Duroc which used to be served by Line 10 was transferred to Line 14.
- 9 November 1976: Line 14 was incorporated into Line 13, which became a complete north–south line.

== Renamed station ==
- 6 October 1942: Bienvenüe was renamed as Montparnasse–Bienvenüe (today on Line 13).
