= Porte de Vanves station =

Metro station in Paris, France

Porte de Vanves
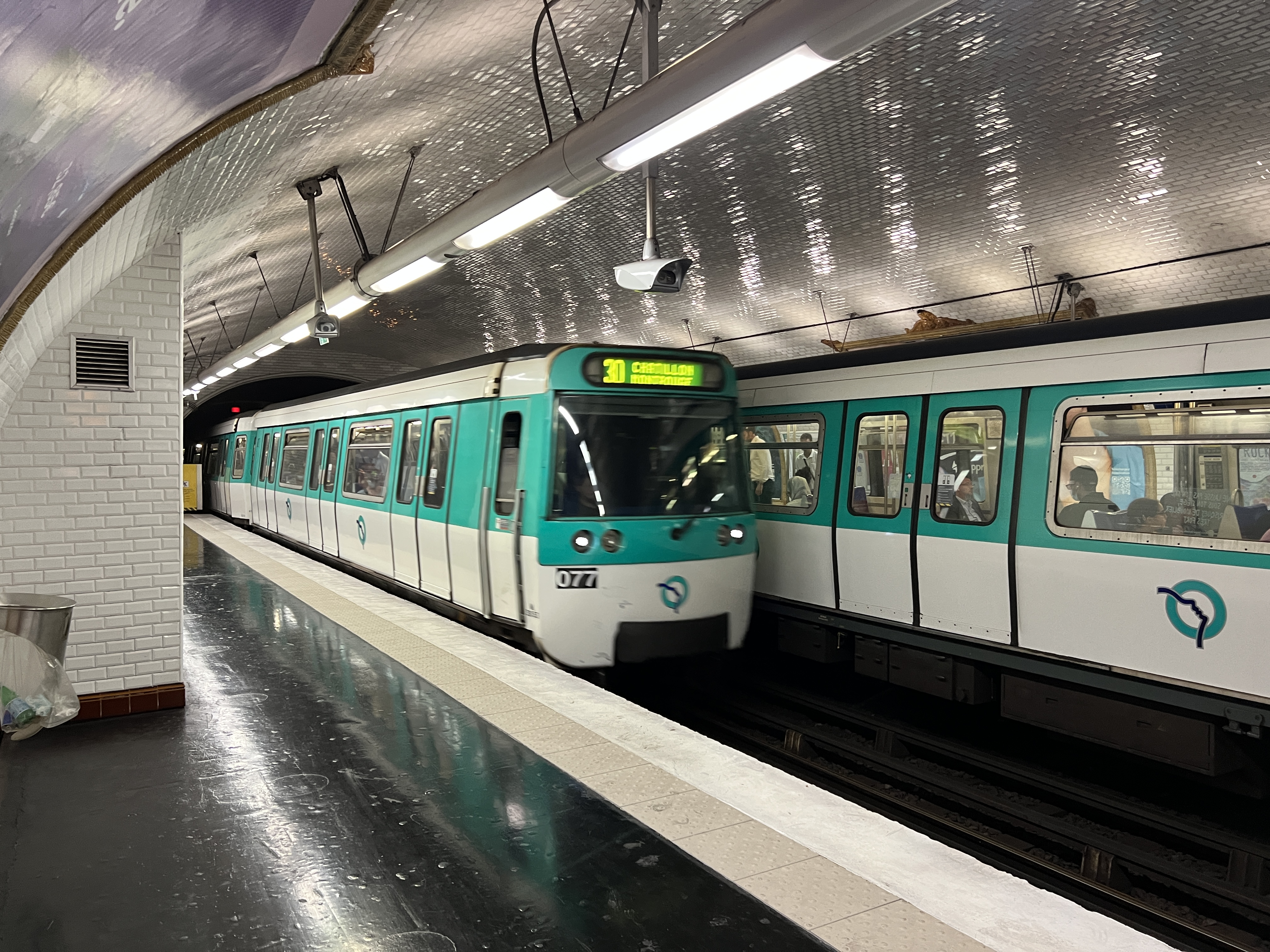
- Two MF 77 at Porte de Vanves

General information
- Location: Avenue de la Porte de Vanves; 14th arrondissement of Paris; Île-de-France; France
- Coordinates: 48°49′41″N 2°18′21″E
- System: Paris Métro station
- Owner: RATP
- Operator: RATP
- Line: Paris Metro Paris Metro Line 13
- Platforms: 2 (2 side platforms)
- Tracks: 2

Construction
- Accessible: no

Other information
- Station code: 2702
- Fare zone: 1

History
- Opened: 21 January 1937

Passengers
- 3,395,358 (2021)

Services
Preceding station	Paris Metro	Following station
Malakoff–Plateau de Vanves towards Châtillon–Montrouge	Line 13	Plaisance towards Les Courtilles or Saint-Denis–Université
Location
- Location within Paris

Porte de Vanves (French pronunciation: [pɔʁt də vɑ̃v]) is a station on Line 13 of the Paris Métro and a stop on tramway Line 3a in the 14th arrondissement.

It is named after the Porte de Vanves, a gate in the 19th century Thiers wall of Paris. Contrary to what its name suggests, it gave access to the commune of Malakoff – the commune of Vanves is instead accessible by Porte Brancion located 250 metres west.

== History ==
The station opened on 21 January 1937 as part of the initial section of the old line 14 between Porte de Vanves and Bienvenüe (today known as Montparnasse–Bienvenue). It served as its southern terminus until 9 November 1976 when it was extended to Châtillon–Montrouge. The old line 14 was incorporated into line 13 on the same day following the latter's extension in successive phases from Saint-Lazare.

In 2019, the station was used by 4,660,158 passengers, making it the 92nd busiest of the Métro network out of 302 stations.

In 2020, the station was used by 2,460,078 passengers amidst the COVID-19 pandemic, making it the 87th busiest of the Métro network out of 304 stations.

In 2021, the station was used by 3,395,358 passengers, making it the 87th busiest of the Métro network out of 304 stations.

== Passenger services ==
=== Access ===
The station has four accesses:

- Access 1: rue Raymond Losserand
- Access 2: Boulevard Brune Marché aux Puces (flea market)
- Access 3: Place de la Porte de Vanves
- Access 4: Boulevard Lefebvre

=== Station layout ===
Street Level
B1	Mezzanine
Platform level	Side platform, doors will open on the right
Platform level	Northbound	← toward Les Courtilles or Saint-Denis–Université (Plaisance)
Platform level	Southbound	toward Châtillon – Montrouge (Malakoff – Plateau de Vanves) →
Platform level	Side platform, doors will open on the right

=== Platforms ===
The station has a standard configuration with 2 tracks surrounded by 2 side platforms. The lower portion of the side walls are vertical instead of elliptical, unlike many other stations on the network.

=== Other connections ===
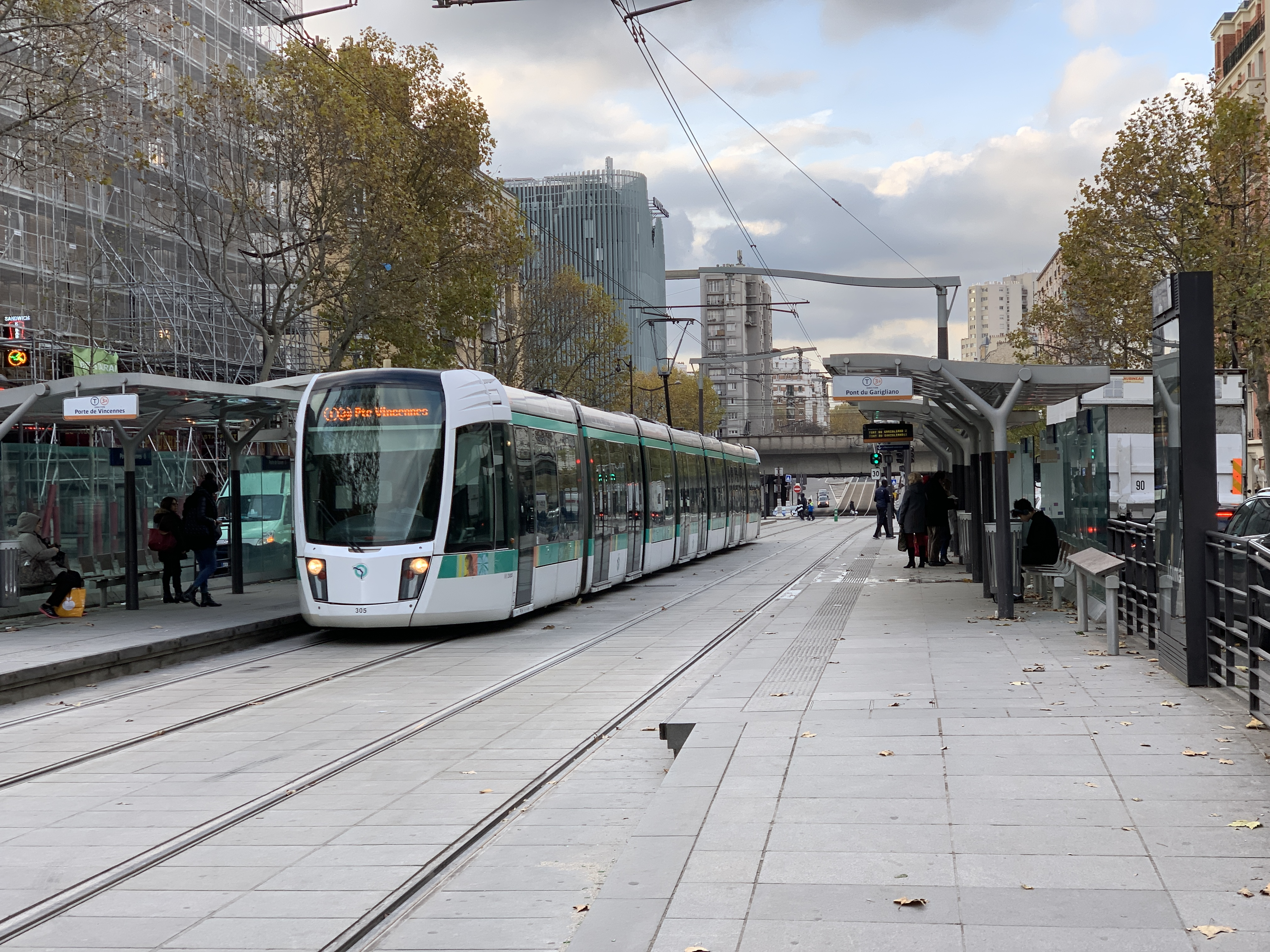
T3a at Porte de Vanves

==== Tramway ====
The station has been served by tramway T3a since 16 December 2006 (as part of its initial section between Pont du Garigliano and Porte d'Ivry).

==== Bus ====
- RATP bus network: lines 58, 59, 95, and 191
- Noctilien: line N63
- Sénart bus network: line 54
- BE Green: Traverse Brancion-Commerce

== Nearby ==
- Jardin Monique-Wittig

== Gallery ==
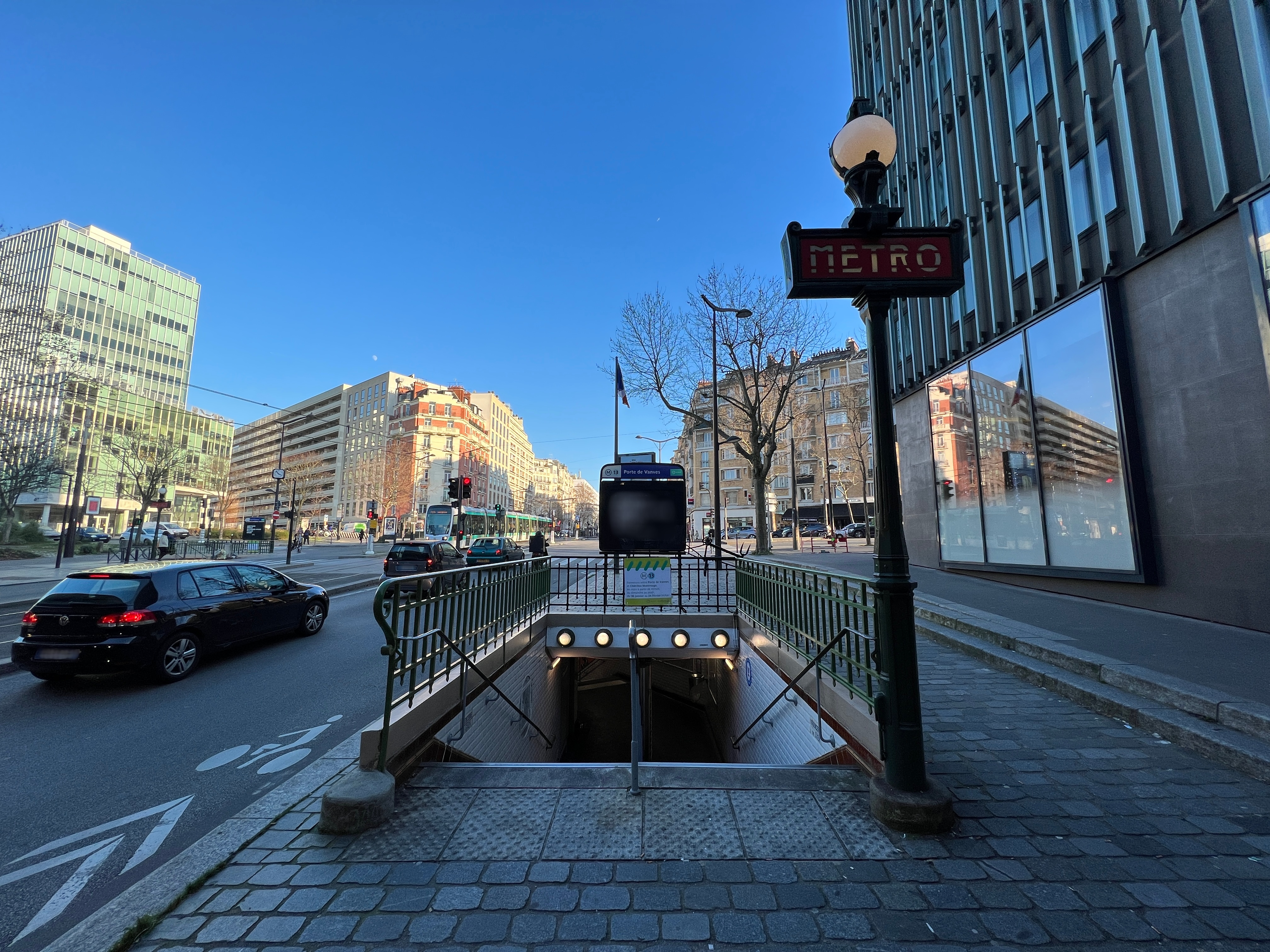
Access 1

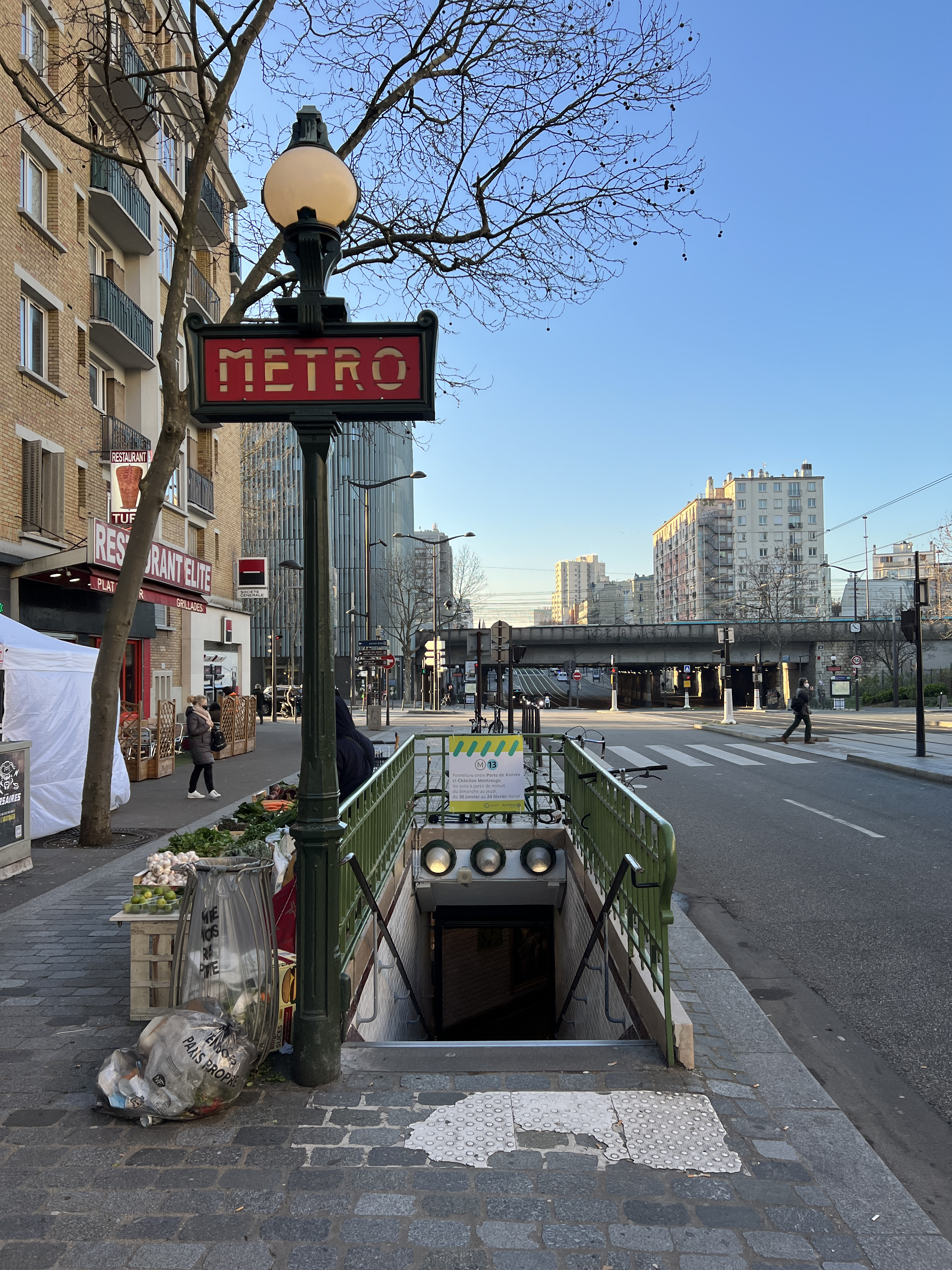
Access 2

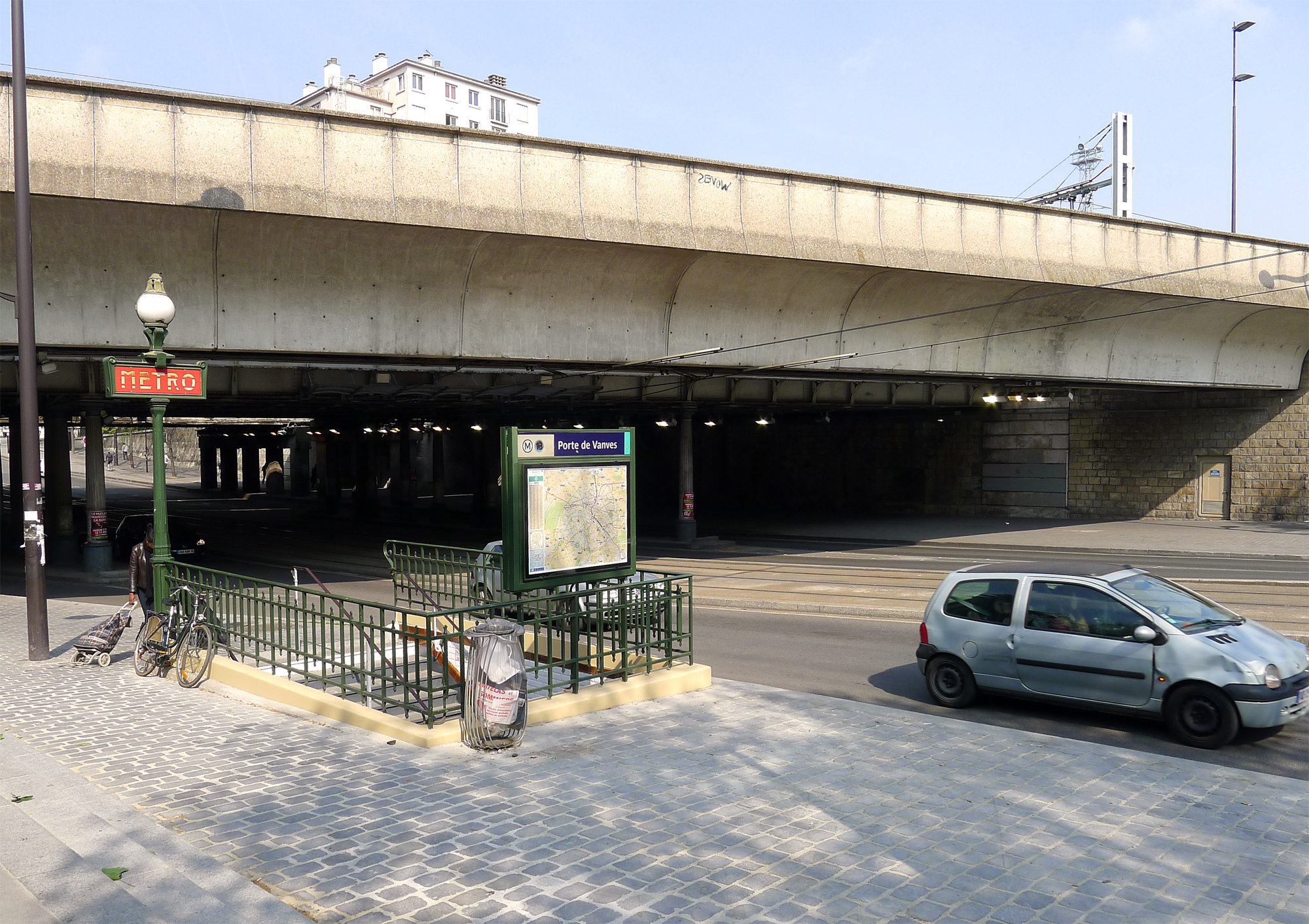
Access 3

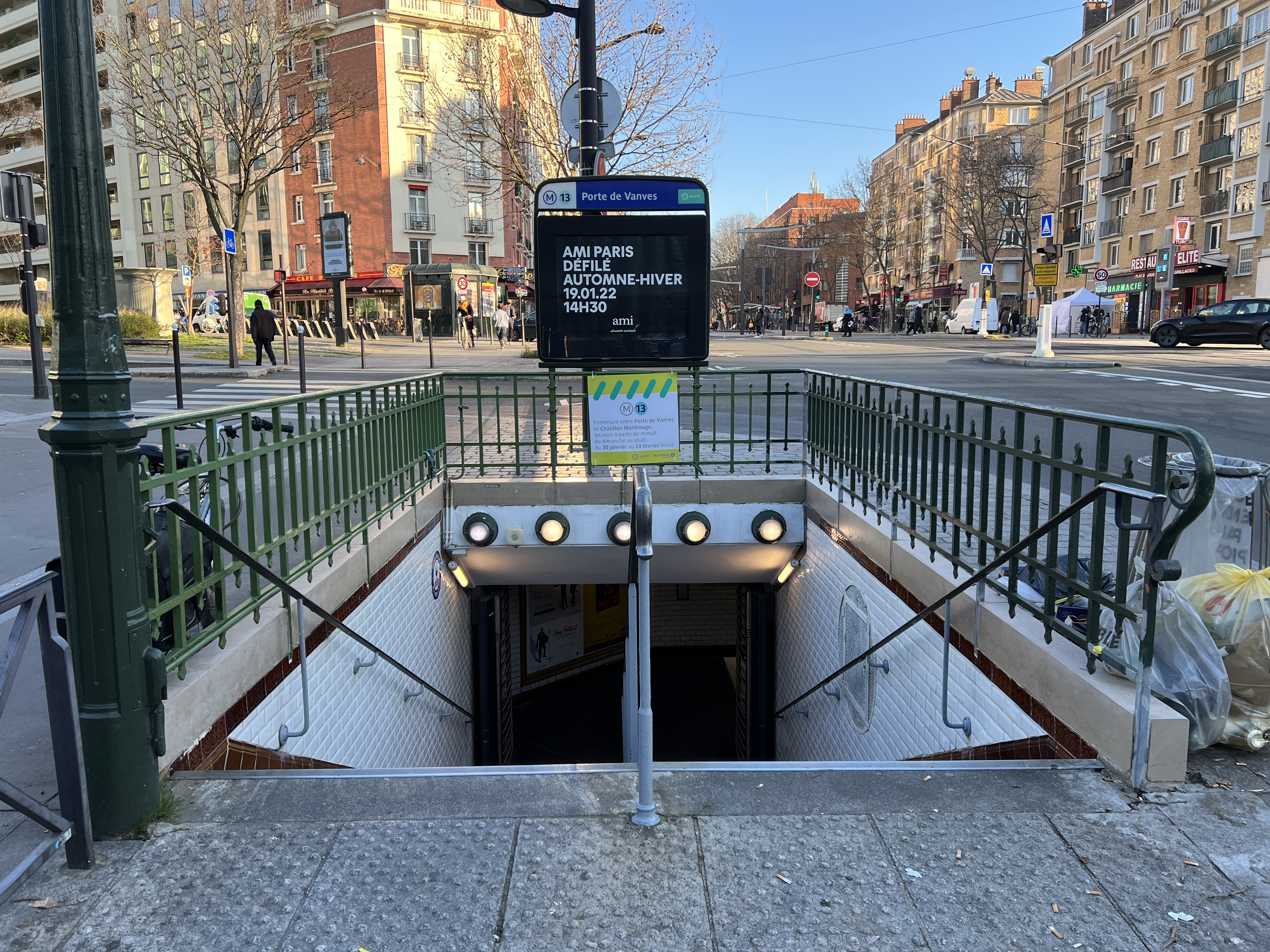
Access 4
