= Montparnasse–Bienvenüe station =

Metro station in Paris, France

Montparnasse Bienvenüe
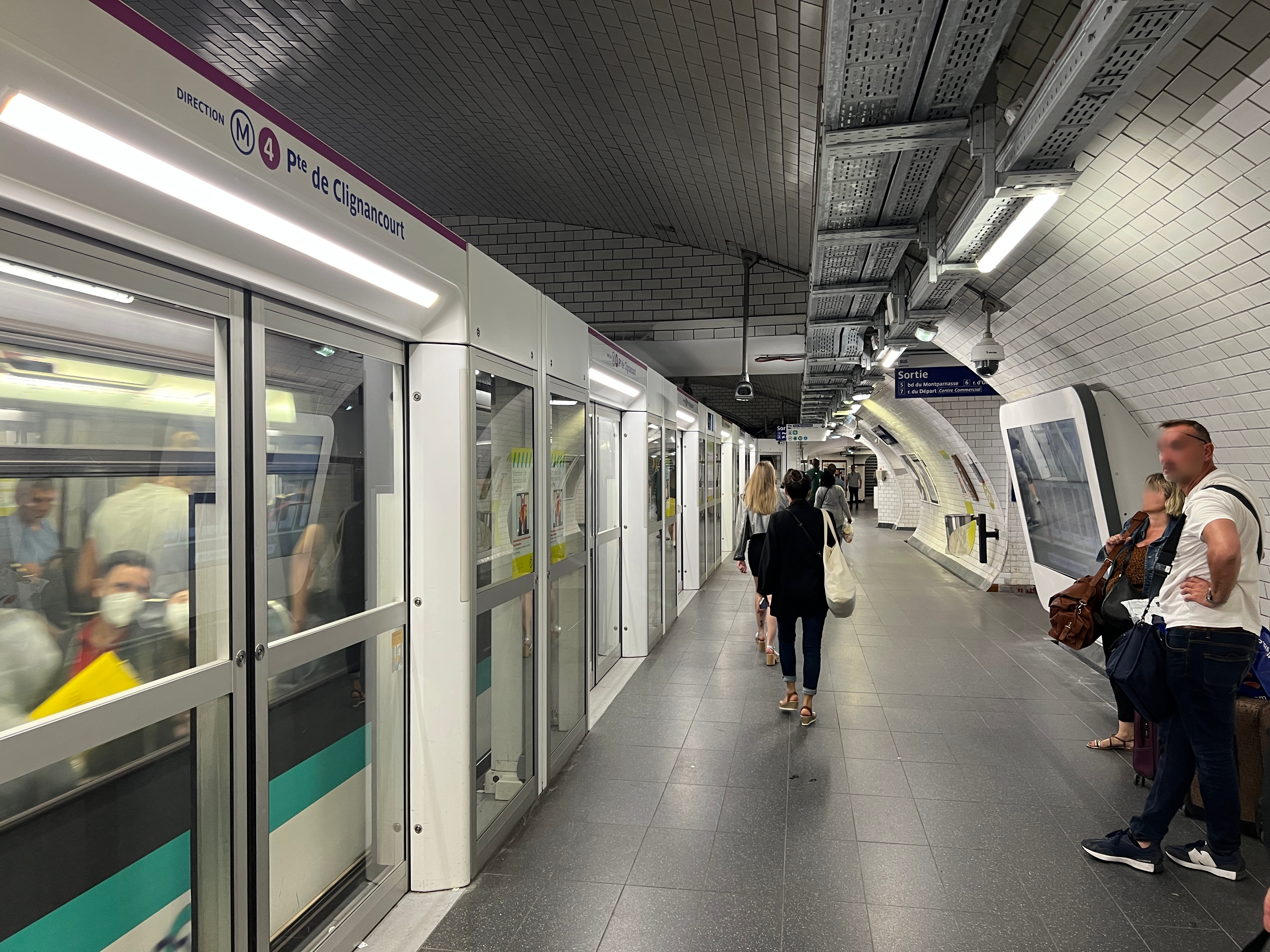
- Montparnasse–Bienvenüe station Line 4 platform

General information
- Location: 14th arrondissement of Paris; France
- Coordinates: 48°50′36″N 2°19′23″E
- Operator: RATP Group
- Connections: at Gare Montparnasse; at Gare Montparnasse; RATP Bus: 28 39 58 88 91 92 94 95 96; Noctilien: N01 N02 N12 N13 N61 N62 N63 N66 N145

Construction
- Accessible: Limited, at least one escalator or lift in the station between the street and the platform

Other information
- Fare zone: 1

History
- Opened: 24 April 1906 (Line 6); 6 April 1910 (Line 4); 5 November 1910 (Line 12); 21 January 1937 (Line 13)
- Former names: Avenue du Maine (1906–1931); Montparnasse (1910–1942); Bienvenüe (1931–1942)

Passengers
- 2021: 20,407,224

Services
Preceding station	Paris Metro	Following station
Vavin towards Bagneux–Lucie Aubrac	Line 4	Saint-Placide towards Porte de Clignancourt
Pasteur towards Charles de Gaulle–Étoile	Line 6	Edgar Quinet towards Nation
Falguière towards Mairie d'Issy	Line 12	Notre-Dame-des-Champs towards Mairie d'Aubervilliers
Gaîté towards Châtillon–Montrouge	Line 13	Duroc towards Les Courtilles or Saint-Denis–Université
Location
- Location within Paris

Montparnasse–Bienvenüe station (French pronunciation: [mɔ̃paʁnas bjɛ̃v(ə)ny]) is a station of the Paris Métro which is a transfer point between Line 4, Line 6, Line 12 and Line 13. The fourth busiest station on the Métro system as of 2019 with 29.9 million riders, it is located in Montparnasse at the intersection of the 6th, 14th and 15th arrondissements.

== Location ==
The stations of Lines 4 and 12 are located to the north under the Boulevard du Montparnasse while those of Lines 6 and 13 are south under Boulevard de Vaugirard and Avenue du Maine respectively.

== History ==
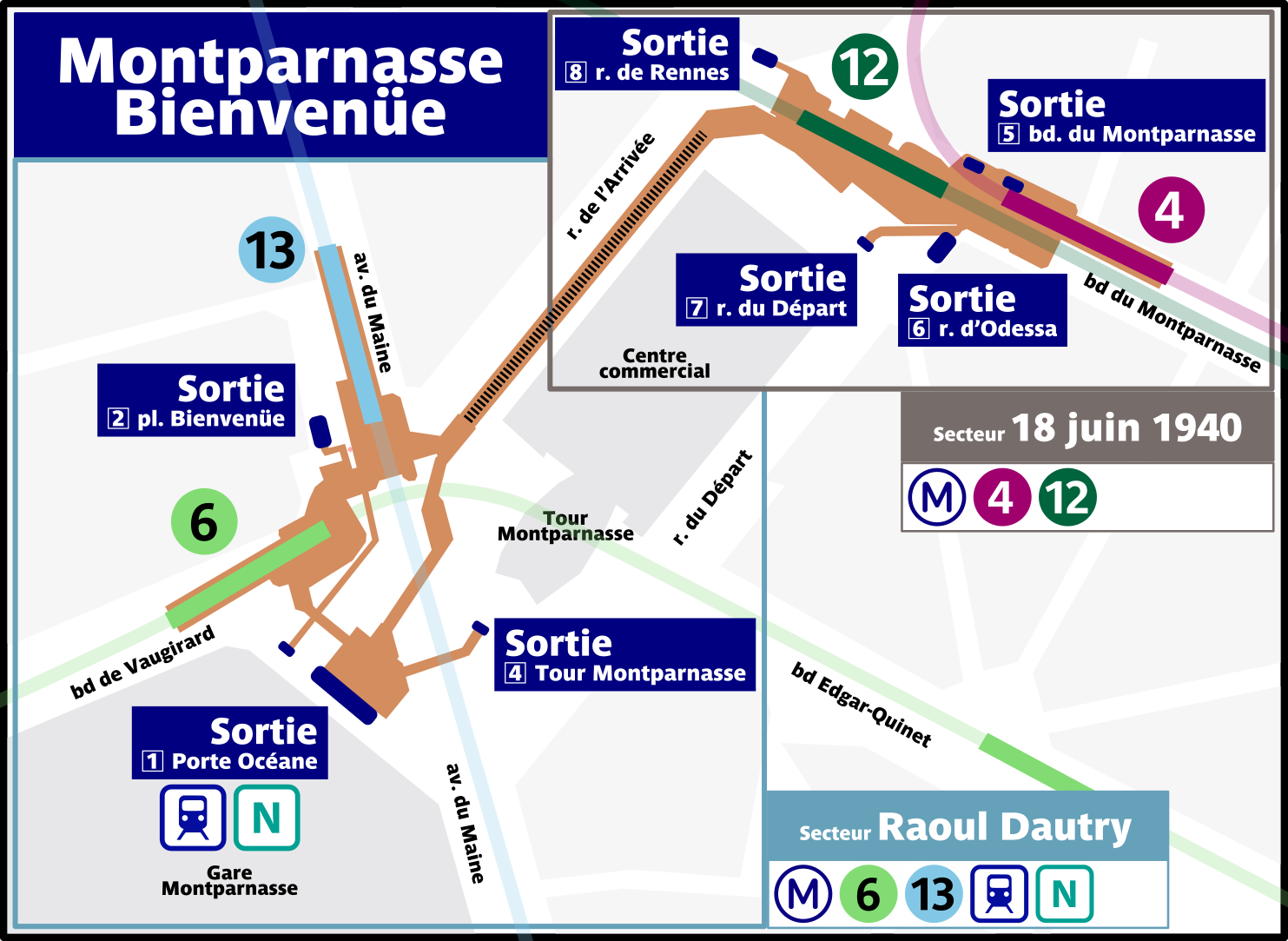
Station map

On 24 April 1906 the station opened as Montparnasse station on the Avenue du Maine at the southern end of the old Gare Montparnasse (at the site currently occupied by the Tour Montparnasse, before the station was moved south of the Avenue du Maine in the 1960s) with the opening of the extension of Line 2 South from Passy to Place d'Italie. On 14 October 1907 Line 2 South became part of Line 5. On 11 March 1910 the Montparnasse station was renamed Avenue du Maine and on 30 June 1933 it was again renamed, to Bienvenüe in honour of the principal engineer of the Paris Métro, Fulgence Bienvenüe (accounting for the unusual diaeresis in the station's name). On 12 October 1942 the section of Line 5 between Étoile and Place d'Italie, including Bienvenüe, was transferred from Line 5 to Line 6 in order to separate the underground and elevated sections of the Métro (because the latter were more vulnerable to air attack during World War II).

The Line 4 platforms opened as Montparnasse in the Boulevard du Montparnasse, near the main entrance of the old Gare Montparnasse (on its northern side) on 9 January 1910 as part of the connecting section of the line under the Seine between Châtelet and Raspail. The Line 12 platforms were opened in the Boulevard du Montparnasse on 5 November 1910 as part of the first section of the Nord-Sud Company's Line C from Porte de Versailles to Notre-Dame-de-Lorette. This line was taken over by the Compagnie du chemin de fer métropolitain de Paris and was renamed Line 12 on 27 March 1931. In 1913 a connection was opened between the platforms of Lines 4 and Line 12 situated on the Boulevard du Montparnasse, both called Montparnasse.

The Line 13 platforms opened in the Avenue du Maine as Bienvenüe on 21 January 1937 as part of the original Line 14 between there and Porte de Vanves, and were connected to the Line 5 platforms. This line became part of Line 13 on 9 November 1976.

=== Connecting the southern and northern stations ===
At the end of the 1930s, a long corridor was built to connect the Montparnasse and Bienvenüe stations. Accordingly, the stations' names were fused to create Montparnasse-Bienvenüe on 6 October 1942. This long corridor is now equipped with moving walkways to facilitate access between the two parts of the station. The old Bienvenüe station serves lines 6 and 13, while the old Montparnasse station serves lines 4 and 12.

In 2002, in an experimental move, the RATP installed a moving walkway that moved at 12 km/h, which was then termed the "fastest in the world." (The speed has however since been reduced to 9 km/h). The first several metres consist of metal rollers that accelerate passengers as they hold onto the handrail, because it would be dangerous to step directly onto the fast-moving conveyor. However, RATP announced in May 2009 that they would replace the walkway with an ordinary one in March 2011 in response to 'numerous customer complaints concerning safety and unreliability'.

=== Barrière du Maine ===
The southern part of the station in the Avenue du Maine was the location of the Barrière du Maine, a gate built for the collection of taxation as part of the Wall of the Farmers-General; the gate was built between 1784 and 1788 and demolished in the nineteenth century.

== Passenger services ==
=== Access ===
The station has seven entrances:

- Entrance 1: Porte Océane: direct access to the SNCF station, stairs and escalators;
- Entrance 2: Place Bienvenüe: a staircase at 32 Avenue du Maine;
- Entrance 4: Tour Montparnasse: a staircase at Place Raoul-Dautry (between the tower and the train station);
- Entrance 5: Boulevard du Montparnasse: two staircases at 71 and 73 Boulevard du Montparnasse;
- Entrance 6: Rue d'Odessa: a staircase and escalator at 1 Rue du Départ;
- Entrance 7: Rue du Départ: direct access to the basement of the shopping center;
- Entrance 8: Rue de Rennes: a staircase at 59 bis, Boulevard du Montparnasse.

=== Station layout ===
==== Line 4 ====
Side platform with PSDs, doors will open on the right
Northbound	← toward Porte de Clignancourt (Saint-Placide)
Southbound	toward Bagneux–Lucie Aubrac (Vavin) →
Side platform with PSDs, doors will open on the right

==== Line 6 ====
Side platform, doors will open on the right
Westbound	← toward Charles de Gaulle–Étoile (Pasteur)
Eastbound	toward Nation (Edgar Quinet) →
Side platform, doors will open on the right

==== Line 12 ====
Side platform, doors will open on the right
Southbound	← toward Mairie d'Issy (Falguière)
Northbound	toward Mairie d'Aubervilliers (Notre-Dame-des-Champs) →
Side platform, doors will open on the right

==== Line 13 ====
Side platform, doors will open on the right
Northbound	← toward Les Courtilles or Saint-Denis – Université (Duroc)
Southbound	toward Châtillon–Montrouge (Gaîté) →
Side platform, doors will open on the right

=== Platforms ===
The platforms of Line 6 are decorated in the Mouton style with orange tiles and orange luminous lighting strips. Those of Line 12 are in the Ouï-dire style with green lighting strips and Motte seats, white flat tiles, and white cylindrical advertising frames. The platforms of Line 13 are built in the Andreu-Motte style with green lightning strips and green tiled benches, tunnel exits and corridor openings. Green Motte seats are married with the original CMP decoration (white bevelled tiled walls, the name in faience and honey colour advertising frames). These platforms are equipped with platform screen doors.

=== Bus connections ===
The station is served:

- on or near the 18-June-1940 square: by Lines 28, 39, 58, 82, 89, 91, 92, 94, 95 and 96 of the RATP Bus Network, as well as by the OpenTour tourist line and, at night, by lines N01, N02, N12 and N13 of the Noctilien bus network;
- near the Montparnasse station: by Lines 28, 39, 58, 59, 91, 92, 94, 95 and 96 of the RATP Bus Network as well as by Lines 1 and 4 of the Bus Direct bus network and, at night by lines N01, N02, N12, N13, N61, N62, N63, N66 and N145 of the Noctilien bus network.

== Nearby ==
Nearby are the Montparnasse district, the Tour Montparnasse office tower, the Musée Bourdelle (art museum), the Montparnasse Cemetery, the Musée de La Poste (postal museum) and the Jardin Atlantique (a rooftop garden on the roof of the Gare Montparnasse rail terminal).

== Gallery ==
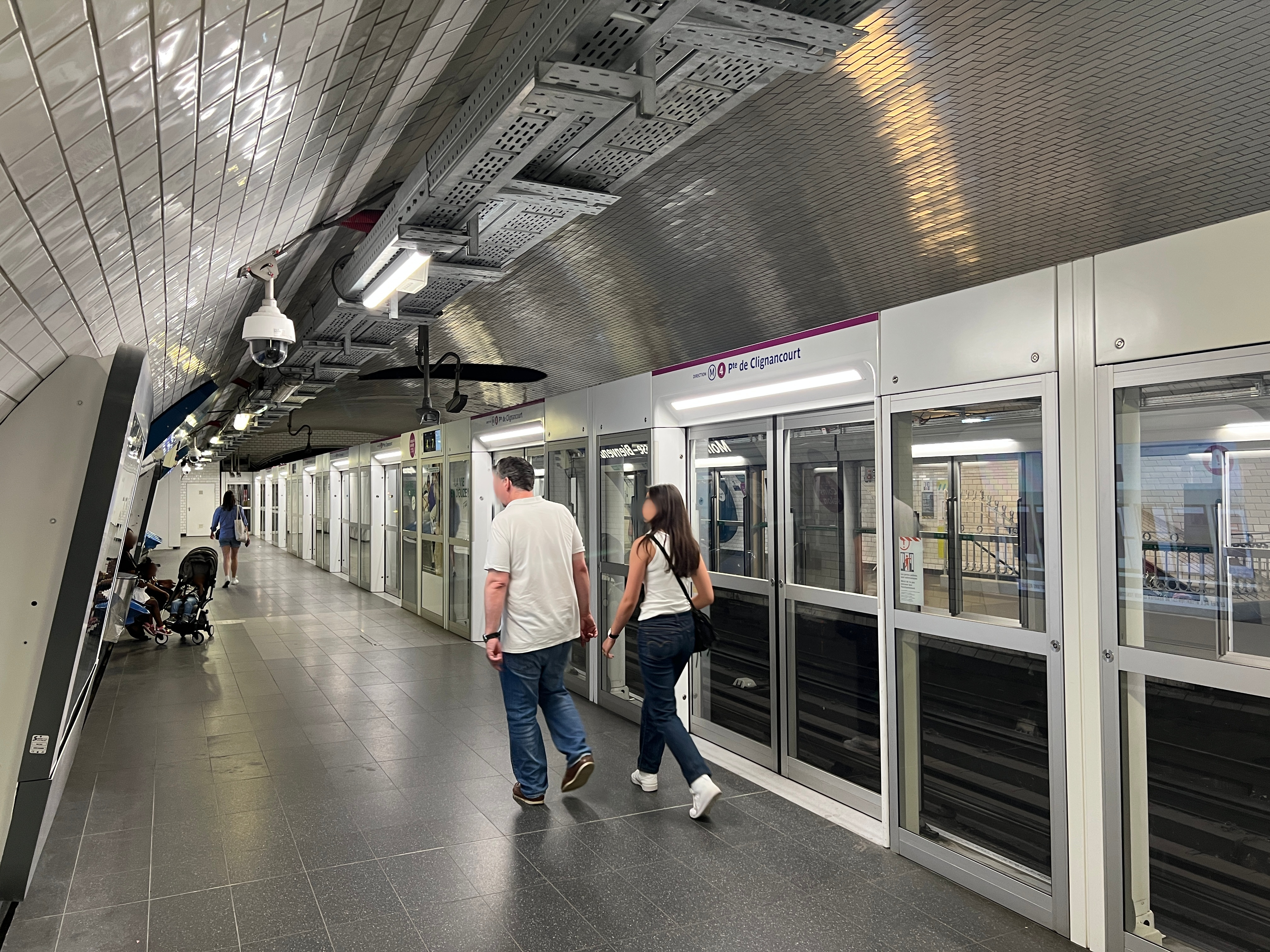
Line 4 platforms at Montparnasse–Bienvenüe

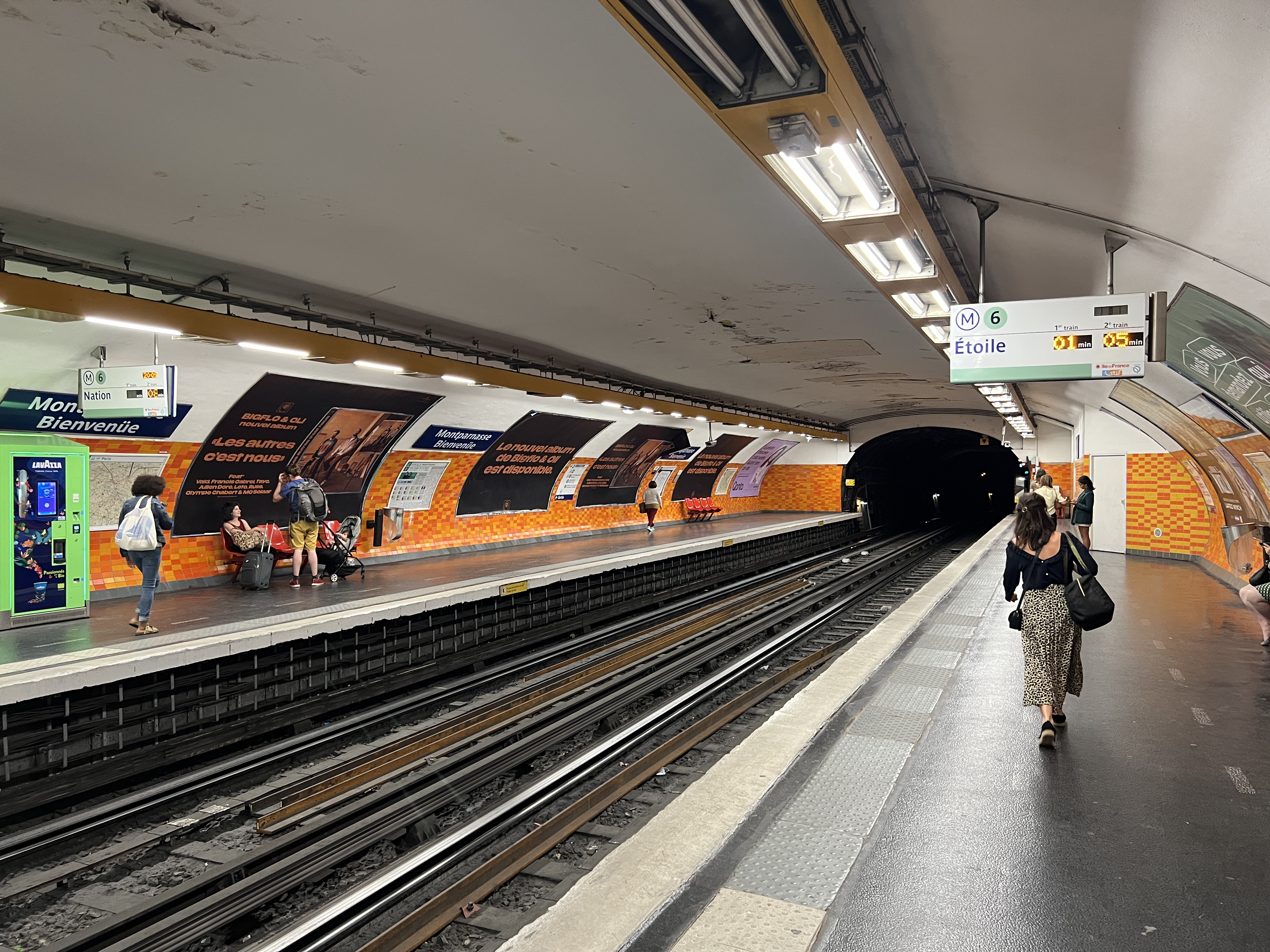
Line 6 platforms at Montparnasse–Bienvenüe

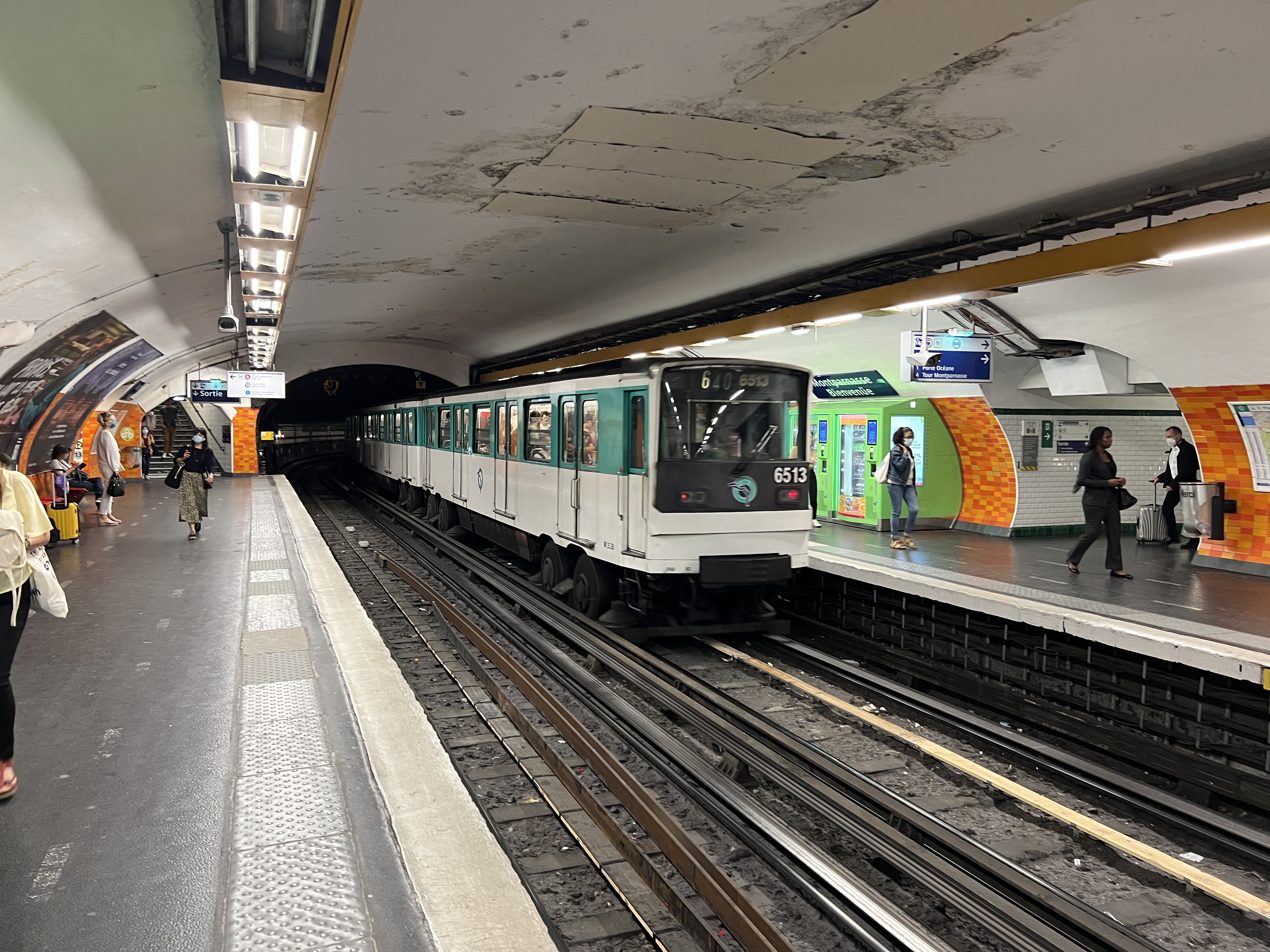
MP 73 rolling stock on Line 6 at Montparnasse–Bienvenüe

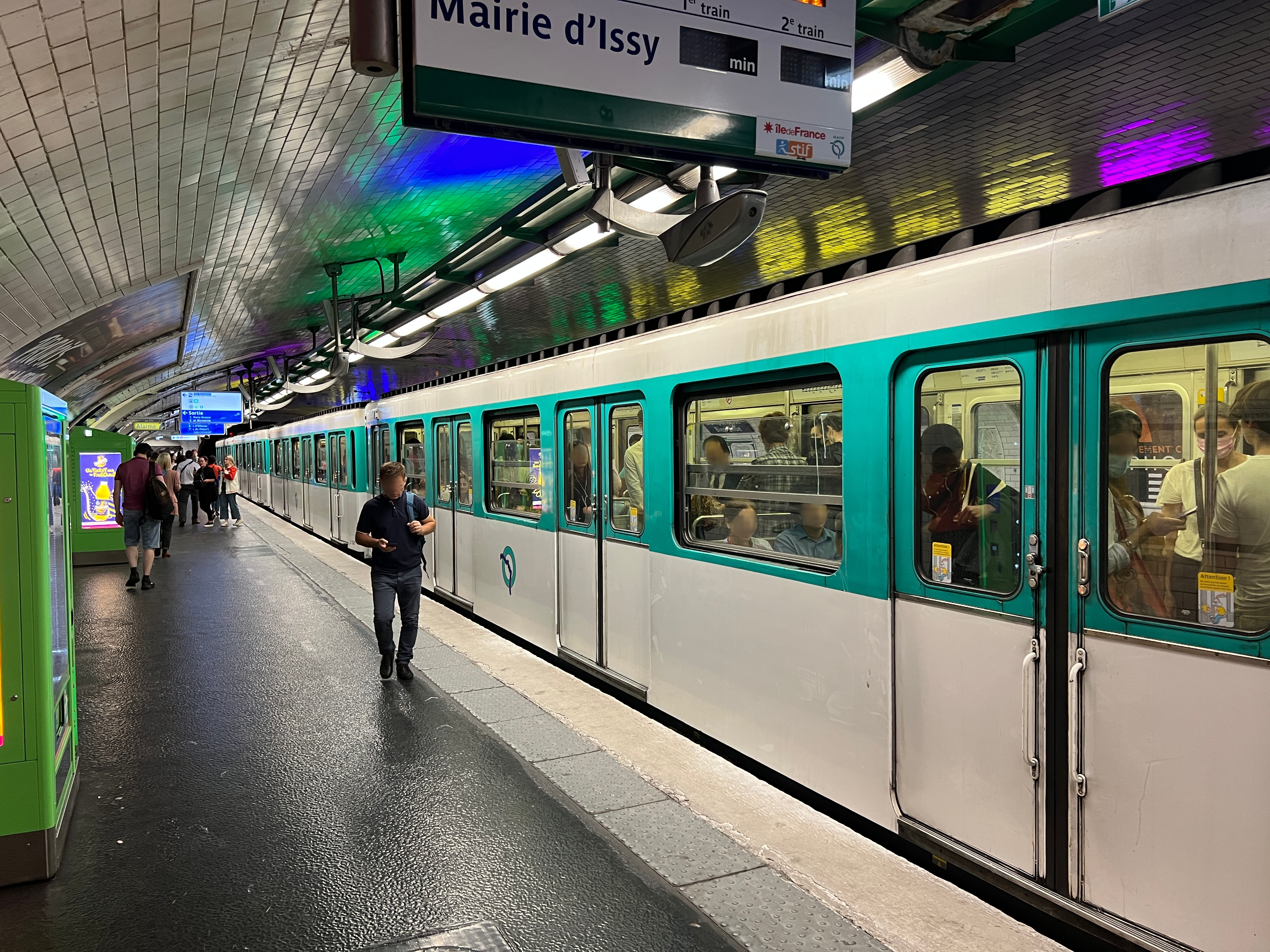
Line 12 platforms at Montparnasse–Bienvenüe

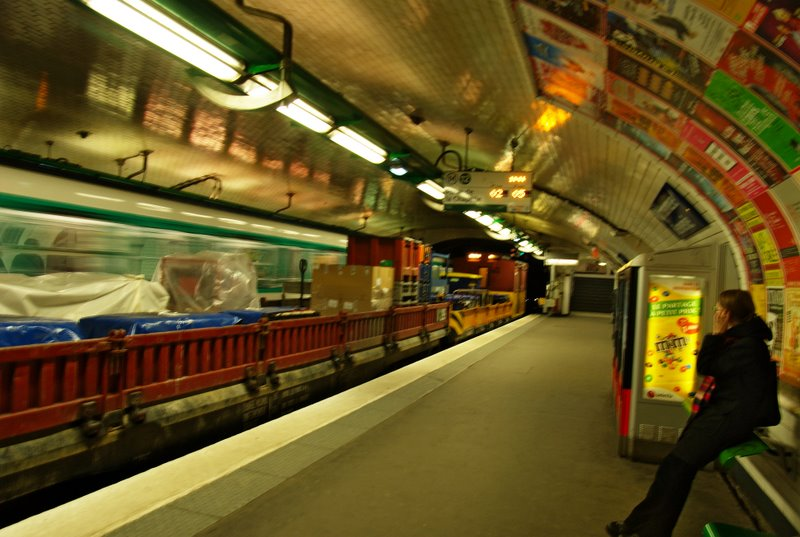
Maintenance Sprague and MF 67 rolling stock at Montparnasse–Bienvenüe

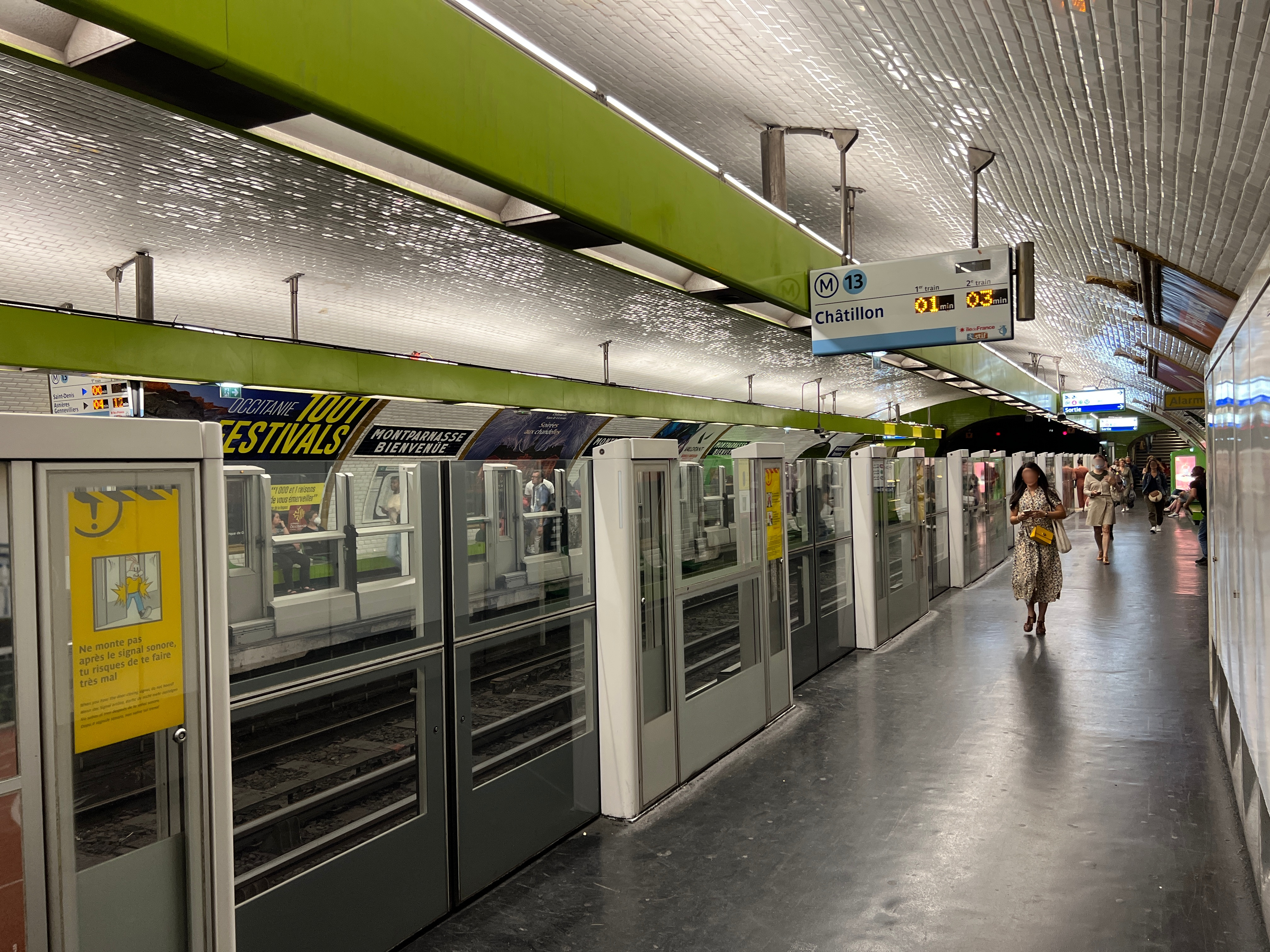
Line 13 platforms at Montparnasse–Bienvenüe

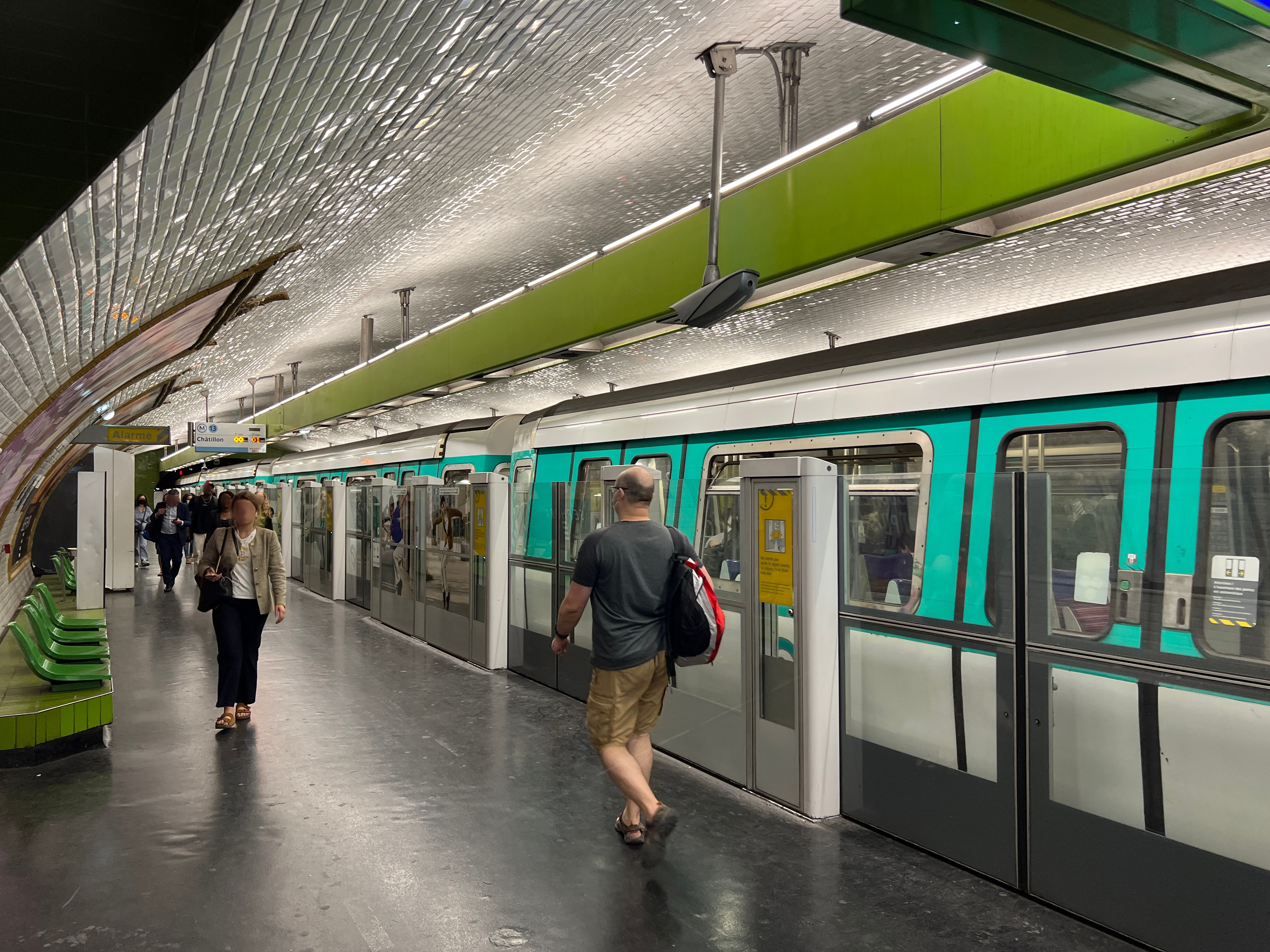
MF 77 rolling stock on Line 13 at Montparnasse–Bienvenüe

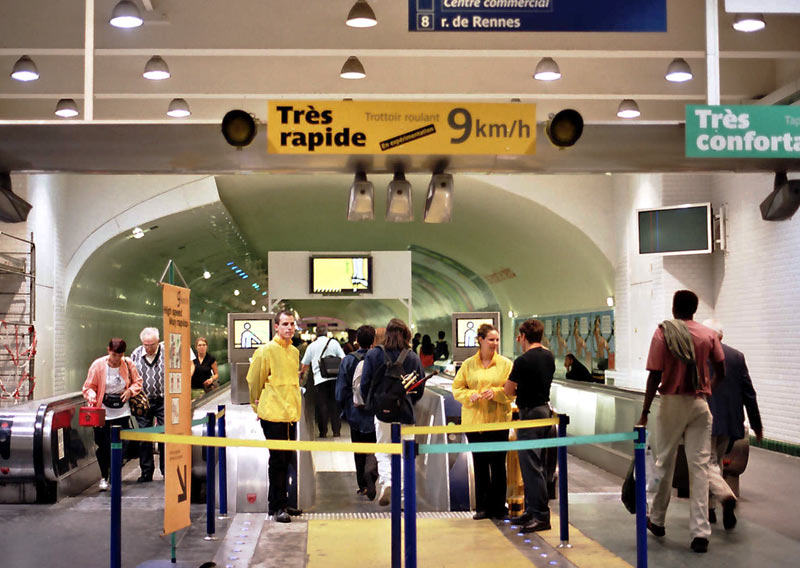
The new walkway during its experimentation phase

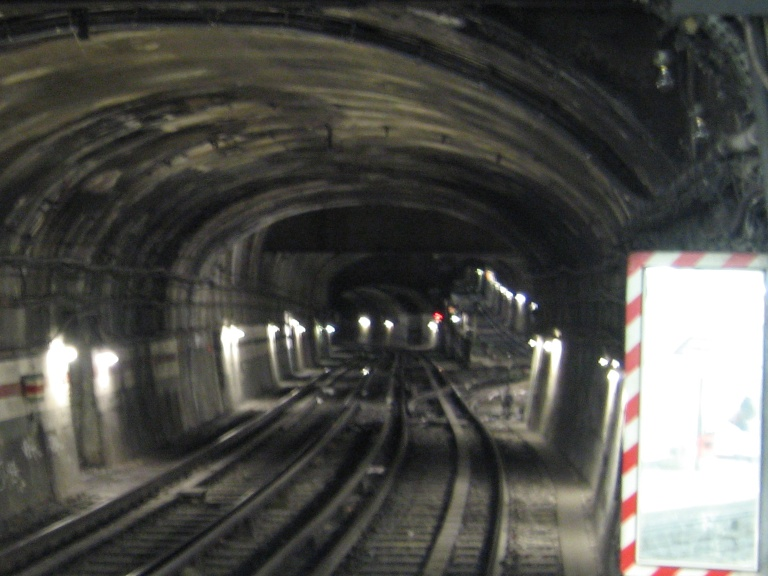
Connection between Lines 4 and 12
