= Red Rock =

Red Rock(s), red rock(s), or Redrock may refer to:

== In generic contexts ==
- Sandstone, in its predominant pinkish-to-deep-dull-red coloration

== Places ==
=== United States ===
==== U.S. settled places ====
- Red Rock, Arizona (disambiguation), several unincorporated communities in Arizona
- Redrock, New Mexico, an unincorporated community in Grant County, New Mexico.
- Red Rock, Oklahoma, town
- Red Rock, Texas, unincorporated community in Texas
- Red Rock, West Virginia, unincorporated community
- Red Rock, Wisconsin, unincorporated community

==== Scenic and recreational areas ====
- Red Rock Canyon National Conservation Area (state-operated), in Las Vegas, Nevada
- Red Rock Island, in San Francisco Bay, California
- Redrock Mountain Natural Area Preserve, a 640-acre Natural Area Preserve in Smyth County, Virginia
- Red Rocks Park, Colorado
- Red Rock Pass (a saddle-point), Idaho
- Red Rock State Park, in Arizona
- Red Rock Preserve, within Edge of Appalachia Preserve in Ohio
- Red Rock (Wyoming), inscribed rock formation
- Red Rock (Gallup, New Mexico), along Interstate 25 in New Mexico

=== Australia ===
- Red Rock (Victoria), crater complex near Colac in Victoria
- Red Rock, New South Wales, small town near Grafton, New South Wales

=== Canada ===
- Red Rock, Ontario, a township in Ontario, Canada
- Red Rock Indian Band, an Indian band in Ontario, Canada

=== Other countries ===
- Red Rock railway station, a former railway station in the Red Rock area of Standish, England
- Icaria, known as the "red rock" due to communists being exiled there after the Greek Civil War.

== Arts and entertainment ==
=== Novels ===
- Red Rock, by Thomas Nelson Page
- Red Rock, by Terri Windling

=== TV and movies ===
- Red Rock (TV series), an Irish soap opera (2015–2020)
- Red Rock West, a 1993 film starring Nicolas Cage

=== Music ===
- HaSela haAdom (The Red Rock), Israeli song

== Companies and brands ==
- Red Rock (drink), a brand of American ginger ale and cola
- Red Rock Cider, an English brand of cider
- Red Rock Consulting, a business unit of Australian IT services company UXC
- Redrock Media, a media company headquartered in Utah, United States, which owns radio stations

== Other uses ==
- Red Rock (bull), brand #007, the ProRodeo Hall of Fame bucking bull
- Red Rock Resort Spa and Casino, a casino in Summerlin, Nevada

== See also ==
- Uses of "Red Rock" (singular), adjectivially in a geographic proper name:
  - Red Rock River (disambiguation)
  - Red Rock Canyon (disambiguation)
  - Red Rock Lake (disambiguation)
- Red Rocks (disambiguation)
