= St. Denis station =

St. Denis station or Saint-Denis station may refer to:

- St. Denis station (MARC), St. Denis, Maryland
- Saint-Denis station, Saint-Denis, Seine-Saint-Denis, France
- Saint-Denis–Porte de Paris station
- Saint-Denis–Pleyel station
- Saint-Denis-près-Martel station, Saint-Denis-lès-Martel, France

== See also ==
- St Denys railway station
