= Marlene Tseng Yu =

Taiwanese-American painter

- Born: 1937 (age 88–89); Japanese Taiwan
- Education: National Taiwan Normal University (BA); University of Colorado Boulder (MFA)
- Style: Abstract Expressionism
- Patrons: University of Denver

Marlene Tseng Yu (born 1937) is a Taiwanese-American artist known for her mural-sized, nature-inspired, abstract expressionist paintings. She has exhibited her "Forces of Nature" series extensively in Europe, Asia, and North America. She is founder of the Rainforest Art Foundation.

== Biography ==
Yu graduated from National Taiwan Normal University. She then went to the University of Colorado Boulder for her master's degree in fine arts, and then taught at University of Denver. Her first televised interview was given by Barbara Walters on The Today Show. Her dual-hemispheric education allowed her to synthesize Chinese painting and Abstract Expressionism, experiment with acrylic paint and develop her own brush techniques on canvas and paper, with nature as her inspiration.

Her main theme is the "Forces of Nature," in which she hopes "to capture the spirit of the universe, its rhythm and movements, its quiet and angry moods, its colors and forms..." in natural phenomena such as avalanches, geysers, coral reefs, calving glaciers, black holes, stalagmite formation, amber resin, Aspen leaves and wind, red rock canyons, crystals, turquoise, and volcanoes. In the 1980s, her minor Dream Series depicted a love story with female torsos and body parts surrounded by animals symbolizing the male.

=== Recent years ===
Yu's 33-foot-long (10 m) works are permanently displayed on rotation in a circular room at Queensborough Community College Art Gallery, alongside temporary exhibits such as Pablo Picasso, Andy Warhol, and Queensborough Community College art students, who have submitted essays discussing her technique and subject matter. In 2006, her four "Elements of Life" (Earth, Air, Water, Fire) paintings were followed by her "March of the Icebergs," in response to today's growing concerns about global warming.

=== Personal life ===
She, and her real estate developer husband, James K. Yu, lived and worked in SoHo, New York City from 1969 to 2007, and in 2008, opened a studio in Long Island City, Queens. The couple has two children, Daniel and Stephanie.

== Selected exhibitions ==
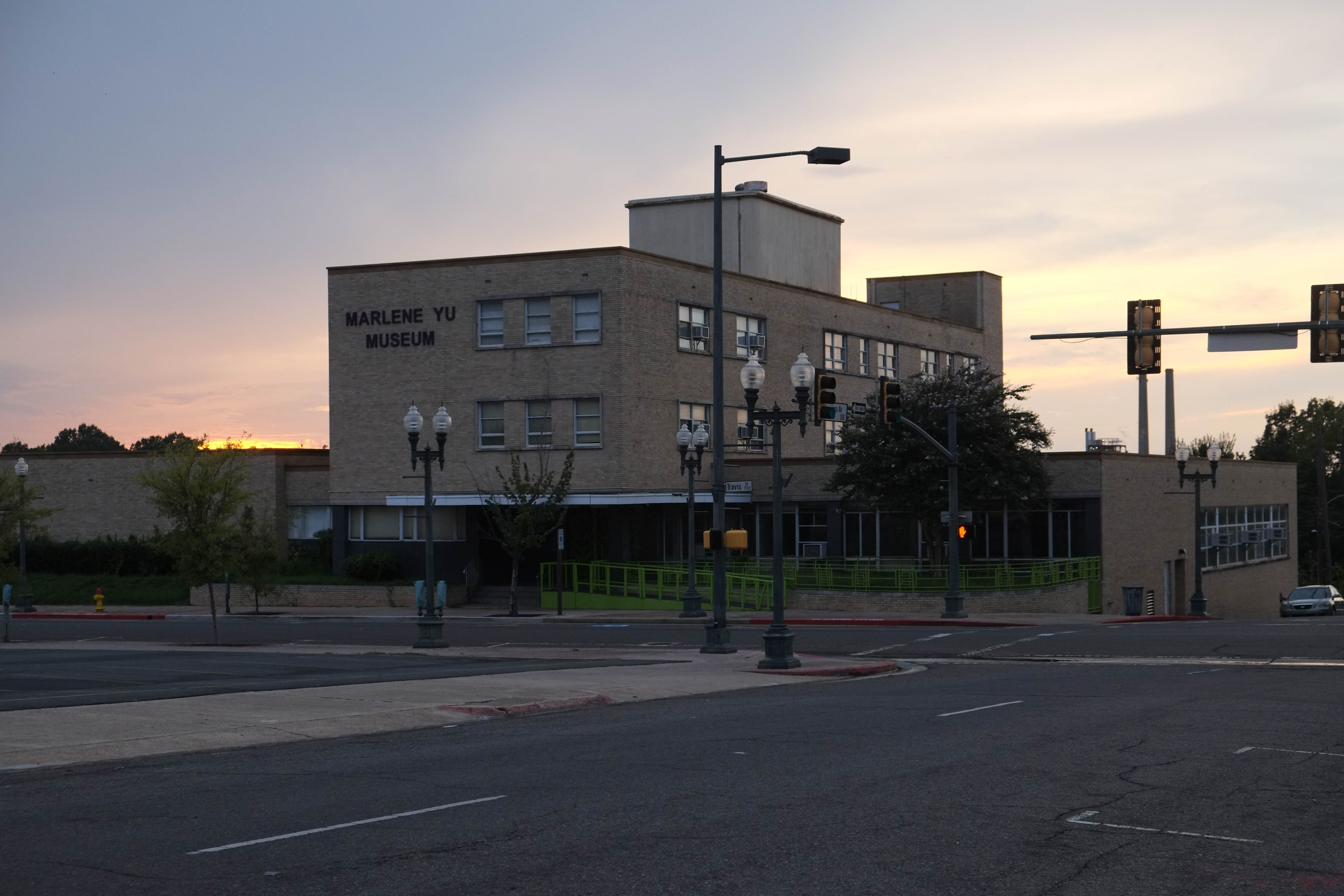
Marlene Yu Museum in Shreveport, Louisiana

- Musée d'Art et d'Histoire
- Grande Arche
- National Gallery in Prague
- Taipei Fine Arts Museum
- National Art Museum of China
- Lincoln Center
- New York Academy of Art
- Chelsea Art Museum
- San Jose Museum of Art
