= Carrefour Pleyel station =

Metro station in Paris, France

Carrefour Pleyel
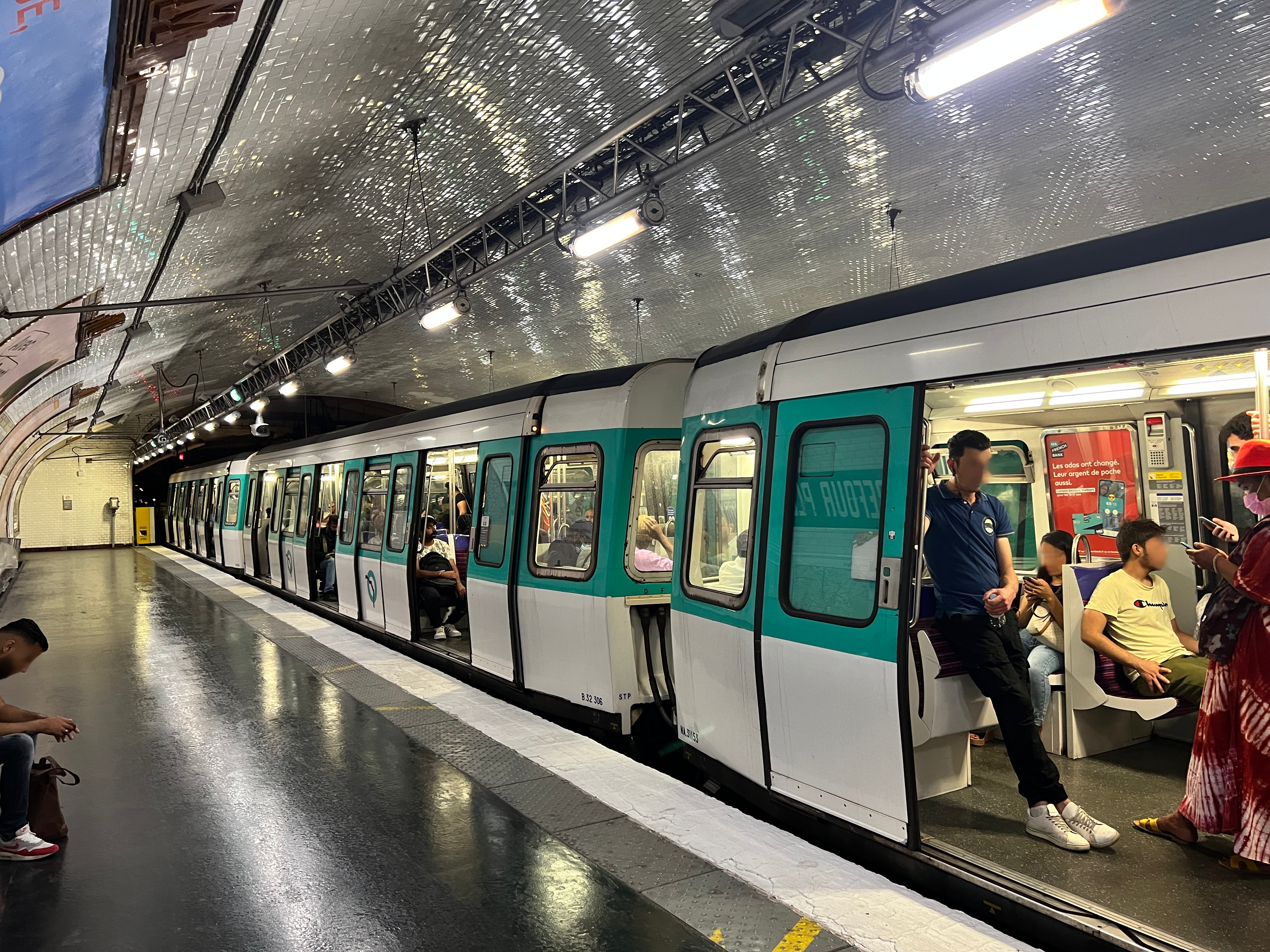

General information
- Location: Saint-Denis, Seine-Saint-Denis; Île-de-France; France
- Coordinates: 48°55′12″N 2°20′38″E
- Operator: RATP Group
- Connections: at Saint-Denis–Pleyel; at Stade de France–Saint-Denis

Construction
- Accessible: At least one escalator or lift in the station between the street and the platform

Other information
- Fare zone: 1

History
- Opened: 30 June 1952

Services
Preceding station	Paris Metro	Following station
Mairie de Saint-Ouen towards Châtillon–Montrouge	Line 13 Saint-Denis branch	Saint-Denis–Porte de Paris towards Saint-Denis–Université
Connections to other stations
Preceding station	Paris Metro	Following station
Terminus	Line 14 transfer at Saint-Denis–Pleyel	Mairie de Saint-Ouen towards Aéroport d'Orly
Preceding station	RER	Following station
Saint-Denis towards Creil	RER D transfer at Stade de France–Saint-Denis	Gare du Nord towards Corbeil-Essonnes
Saint-Denis towards Goussainville	RER D transfer at Stade de France–Saint-Denis	Gare du Nord towards Melun
Location
- Location within Paris and inner ring

Carrefour Pleyel station (French pronunciation: [kaʁfuʁ plɛjɛl]) is a station on Line 13 of the Paris Métro in the Saint-Denis plain in the commune of Saint-Denis. It was opened in 1952.

== History ==
As part of a major works plan to reduce unemployment in the Paris region, the extension of the metro line from Porte de Saint-Ouen to Carrefour Pleyel was decided on 20 November 1940. The work began in February 1941. The sites progressed rapidly at first before the German occupation authorities slowed them down before stopping them completely in 1943. After the Liberation of France, work resumed when materials required were gradually restored. In 1948, the infrastructure was built and the station equipped at the beginning of 1950. The post-war period was a period of low investment for RATP, so much so that the station was only opened on 30 June 1952.

It was the northern terminus of the northern branch of the line until 26 May 1976, when the line was extended to Basilique de Saint-Denis. It is named after Carrefour Pleyel ("Pleyel crossroads"), which is named after the Austrian composer Ignaz Pleyel (1757-1831) who founded a musical publishing house in Paris. In 1807, he created near the future Carrefour Pleyel the famous Pleyel et Cie piano factory, which ceased production in 2013. The factory gave its name to the Rue des Pianos ("street of the pianos") near the station.

Because it was opened as a terminal station, it includes two tracks for trains going to Paris and several sidings, one of which gives access to an underground workshop for train maintenance, called the Atelier de Pleyel.

The station was decorated on the theme of "music" for the centenary of the Paris metro. An interactive lighting system was also implemented, especially in the basement of the station, which was the former terminus had therefore had facilities for metro employees that are now unused. But, following complaints by drivers and the Line 13 users association, the interactive system was closed down after two weeks of operation. Blue LEDs and elements of the inactive lighting facility still exist in the station.

Its name comes from the Pleyel crossroads, where two major road axes historically intersect: the RN 14 and the Route de la Révolte, and, more recently, access ramps to the A86 motorway. The Austrian piano maker and composer Ignace Joseph Pleyel (1757-1831) founded a musical publishing house in Paris and, in 1807, his famous piano factory on the site of this crossroads. The Pleyel brand is still active, but the manufacture has left Saint-Denis. In order to perpetuate this history, the city of Saint-Denis has named a place located nearby the Place des Pianos.

In 2019, 2,473,446 travellers entered this station, which places it in 210th position among metro stations for its use out of 302.

== Passenger services ==
=== Access ===
Different entrances allow access to the station by stairs, on the Place des Pianos, le Cap Ampère, Boulevard Anatole-France as well as on Boulevard Ornano.

=== Station layout ===
G	Street Level	Exit/Entrance
B1	Mezzanine	Fare control, connection between platform
B2	Side platform, doors will open on the right
B2	Northbound	← toward Saint-Denis–Université (Saint-Denis–Porte de Paris)
B2	Center track	No regular service
B2	Island platform, doors will open on the left
B2	Southbound	toward Châtillon–Montrouge (Mairie de Saint-Ouen) →

=== Platforms ===
The station has a side platform (served by trains to Saint-Denis) and a central platform, flanked by two tracks served by trains to Châtillon, all under a semi-elliptical arch. This particular configuration is due to its status as a terminus station from 1952 to 1976, then to serve the Pleyel workshop from 1974, an underground maintenance workshop for the trains. It has three specific lighting canopies made up of a tubular framework on which transparent tubes are hung for neon lights. The bevelled white ceramic tiles cover the walls, the vault, the exit tunnels and the outlets of the corridors. The platforms are equipped with white Motte style seats and the name of the station is inscribed in earthenware in the style of the original CMP on the walls, and in Parisine font on enamelled plaques on the central panels of the platform central. The advertising frames are special, in brown earthenware and with simple patterns, they are surmounted by the letter "M". These same style is only present in seven other Paris metro stations.

Unusually, it may happen that trains coming from Saint-Denis-University end at Carrefour Pleyel with passengers moving to another train located on the other track on the same platform, to ensure the continuity of the journey to Paris.

Due to its former status as a terminus station, it has several sidings or stalls, located on either side, in the tunnels, one of which gives access to the Pleyel workshop.

=== Bus connections ===
The station is served by lines 139, 255 and 274 of the RATP Bus Network and, at night, by line N44 of the Noctilien network. The station is located in zone 2, like those of Saint-Ouen, while the other stations are in zone 3.

== Connection project with the Grand Paris Express ==
The Saint-Denis–Pleyel station opened on 24 June 2024 as the terminus of Line 14, shortly before the start of the 2024 Summer Olympics and 2024 Summer Paralympics. It is located west of the Carrefour Pleyel, at the corner of Rue Pleyel and Francisque-Poulbot. It is planned for this station to be a major multimodal hub, servicing Line 15 and terminating 16 and 17. Thus, the station has been designed to be able to accommodate 250,000 passengers a day – comparable to Châtelet–Les Halles. A pedestrian bridge (called Franchissement urbain Pleyel) has been built to connect Carrefour Pleyel station with Saint-Denis–Pleyel station and Stade de France–Saint-Denis station. It spans forty-eight tracks, the widest and busiest railway line in Europe.
