= Stade de France–Saint-Denis station =

Railway station serving Saint-Denis, Paris, France

Coordinates: 48°55′4″N 2°21′2″E

Stade de France Saint-Denis
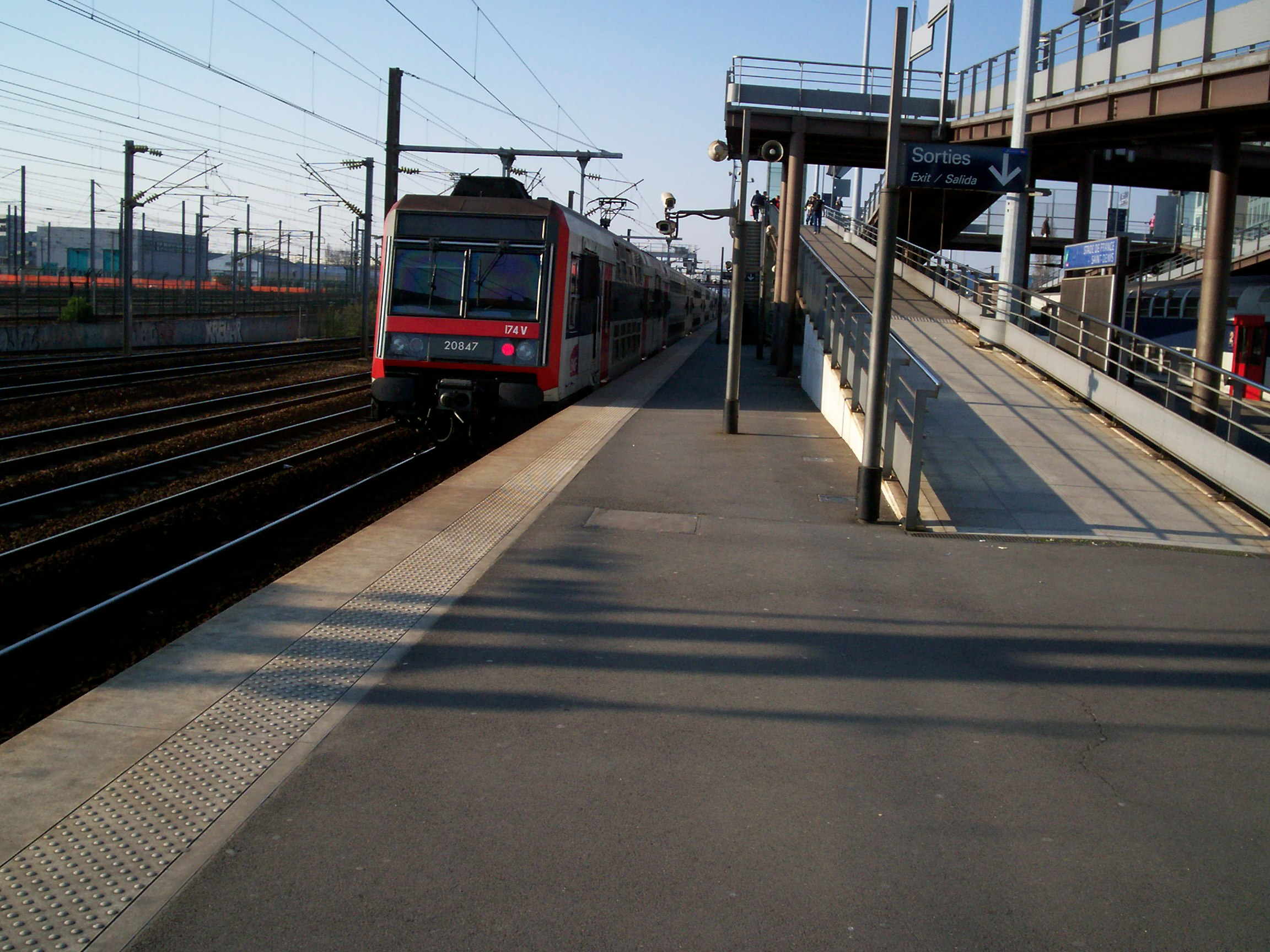
- Station platforms, with the departure of a Z 20500 train, heading for the northern suburbs.

General information
- Location: Place aux Etoiles; Saint-Denis; France
- Elevation: 39 m (128 ft)
- Owner: SNCF
- Operator: SNCF
- Platforms: 2 island platforms
- Tracks: 3
- Connections: at Carrefour Pleyel; at Saint-Denis–Pleyel

Construction
- Accessible: Yes, by prior reservation

Other information
- Station code: 87164780
- Fare zone: 2

Passengers
- 2024: 8,320,522

Services
Preceding station	RER	Following station
Saint-Denis towards Creil	RER D	Gare du Nord towards Corbeil-Essonnes
Saint-Denis towards Goussainville	RER D	Gare du Nord towards Melun
Connections to other stations
Preceding station	Paris Metro	Following station
Mairie de Saint-Ouen towards Châtillon–Montrouge	Line 13 transfer at Carrefour Pleyel	Saint-Denis–Porte de Paris towards Les Courtilles or Saint-Denis–Université
Terminus	Line 14 transfer at Saint-Denis–Pleyel	Mairie de Saint-Ouen towards Aéroport d'Orly
Location

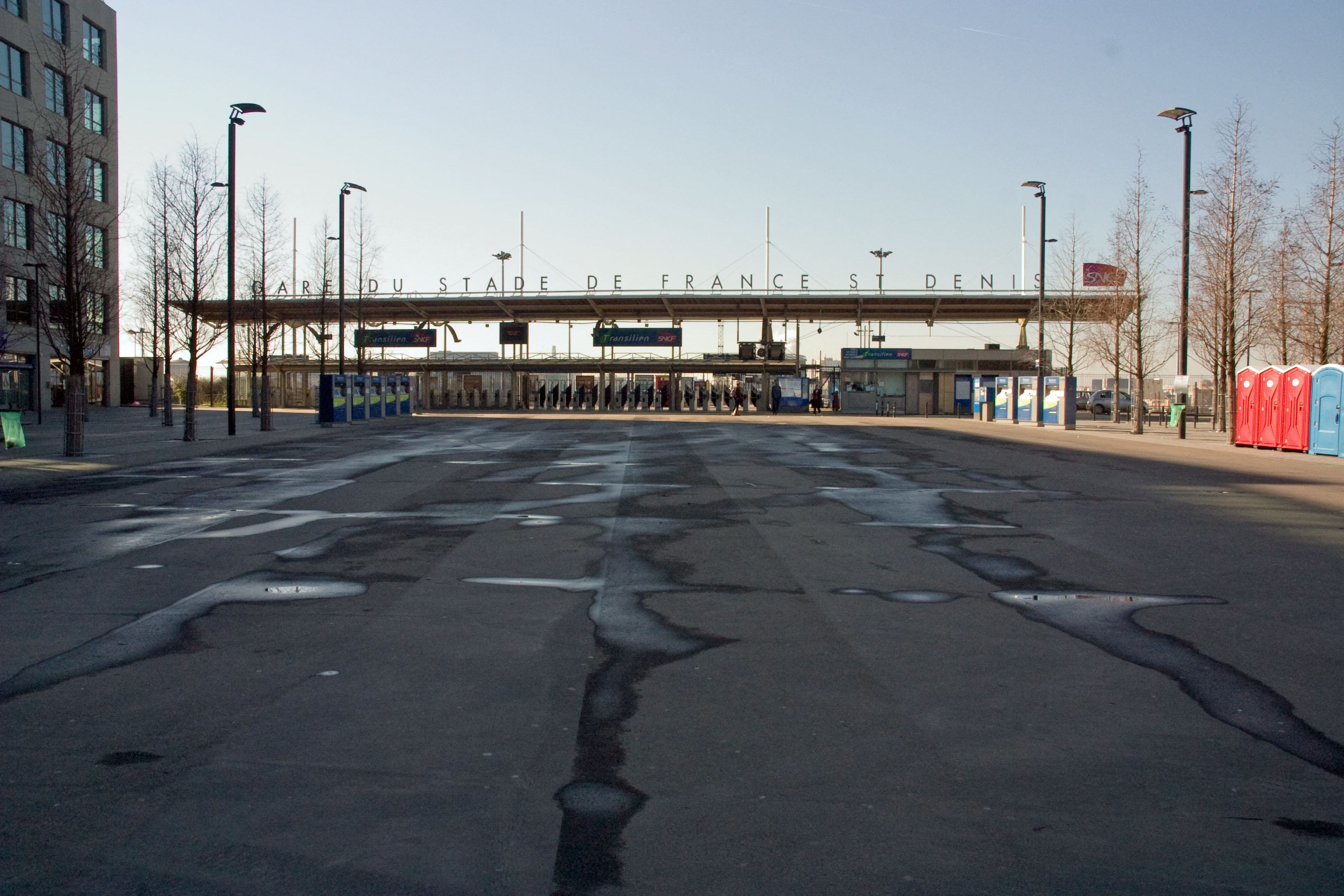
Entrance

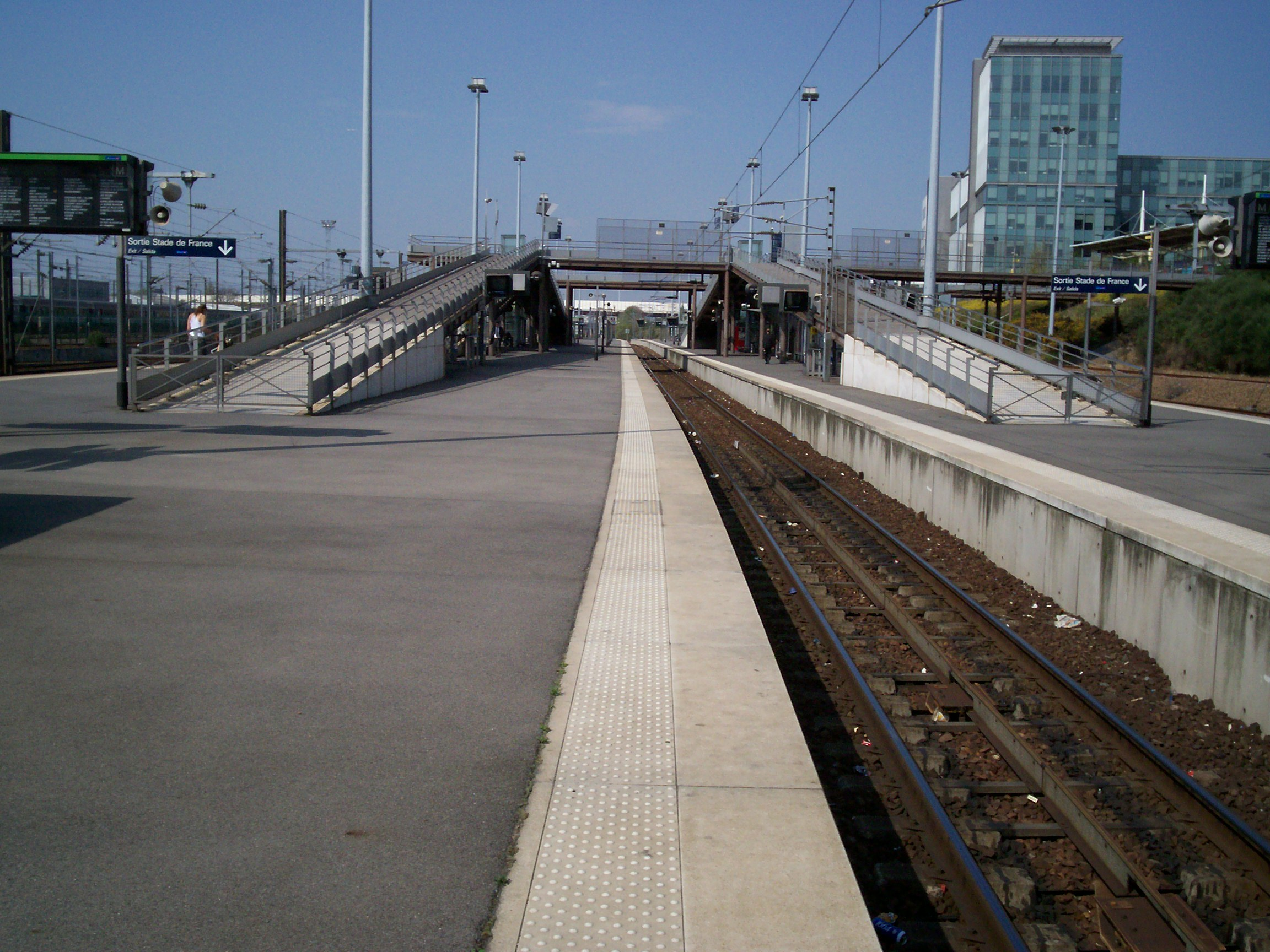
Platforms

Stade de France–Saint-Denis (French pronunciation: [stad də fʁɑ̃s sɛ̃ dəni]) is a railway station serving Saint-Denis, a northern suburb of Paris in Seine-Saint-Denis department, France. It is near the Stade de France, on the RER D suburban railway line. It is on the Paris–Lille railway.

As part of the Grand Paris Express project, a pedestrian bridge (called Franchissement urbain Pleyel) has been built to connect Carrefour Pleyel station and Saint-Denis–Pleyel station. It spans forty-eight tracks, the widest and busiest railway line in Europe. It is planned for Saint-Denis–Pleyel station to be a major multimodal hub, servicing Line 15 and terminating 16 and 17.
