= Saint-Denis–Pleyel station =

Paris Metro station in Saint-Denis, Seine-Saint-Denis

Coordinates: 48.9178°N 2.3464°E

Saint-Denis–Pleyel
- Main, western façade, May 2026

General information
- Location: Saint-Denis; Île-de-France; France
- Owner: Société des Grands Projets
- Operator: Keolis
- Tracks: 6
- Connections: at Carrefour Pleyel; at Stade de France–Saint-Denis

Construction
- Depth: 27 m (89 ft)
- Accessible: Yes
- Architect: Kengo Kuma

History
- Opened: 24 June 2024

Services
Preceding station	Paris Metro	Following station
Terminus	Line 14	Mairie de Saint-Ouen towards Aéroport d'Orly

Future services
Preceding station	Paris Metro	Following station
La Plaine Stade de France towards Noisy–Champs	Line 15 (2031)	Les Grésillons towards Champigny Centre
Terminus	Line 16 (2027)	La Courneuve–Six Routes towards Clichy–Montfermeil
Terminus	Line 17 (2027)	La Courneuve–Six Routes towards Le Bourget Aéroport
Connections to other stations
Preceding station	Paris Metro	Following station
Mairie de Saint-Ouen towards Châtillon–Montrouge	Line 13 transfer at Carrefour Pleyel	Saint-Denis–Porte de Paris towards Les Courtilles or Saint-Denis–Université
Preceding station	RER	Following station
Saint-Denis towards Creil	RER D transfer at Stade de France–Saint-Denis	Gare du Nord towards Corbeil-Essonnes
Saint-Denis towards Goussainville	RER D transfer at Stade de France–Saint-Denis	Gare du Nord towards Melun
Location

Saint-Denis–Pleyel (Note: Station name was originally approved as Saint-Denis Pleyel) (French pronunciation: [sɛ̃ dəni plɛjɛl]) is a Paris Metro station located in Saint-Denis, in the northern suburbs of Paris. Built as part of the Grand Paris Express project, the station was opened on 24 June 2024 as the terminus of Line 14. In the future, the station will serve the orbital Line 15 and be the terminus of lines 16 and 17. The station is operated by Keolis, which will also operate lines 16 and 17.

== Location ==
Located in Saint-Denis, the station lies west of the Paris–Lille railway, at the corner of Rue Pleyel and Francisque-Poulbot. The station Carrefour Pleyel of Line 13 is within walking distance of the station. A new bridge over the Paris-Lille railway lines connects the station to Stade de France–Saint-Denis station on RER D, as well as to the nearby Stade de France. The station serves the Stade de France, and served other venues during the 2024 Summer Olympics and 2024 Summer Paralympics.

== Design ==
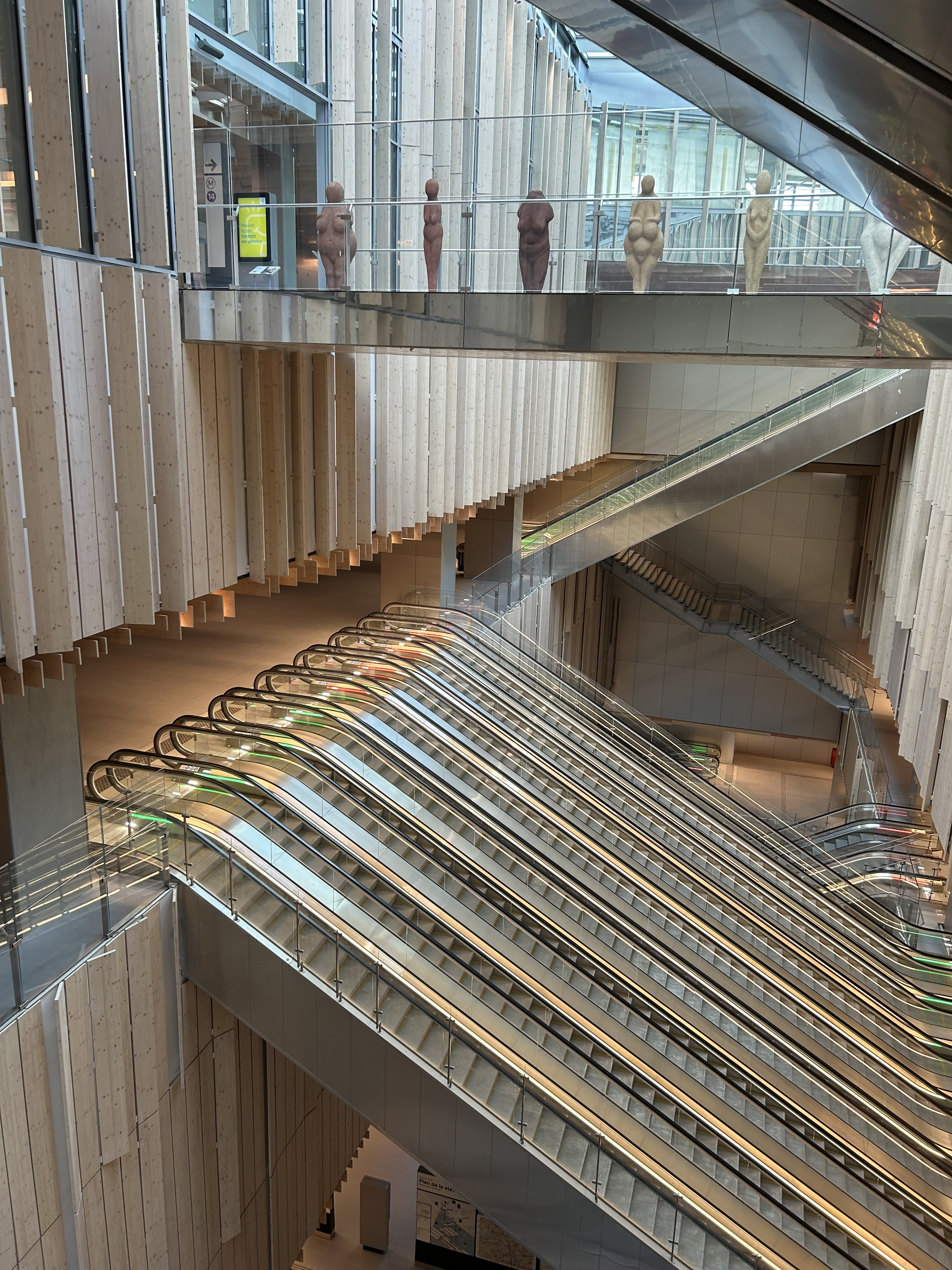
Escalators in the station

Built over 9 levels, the station will be able to accommodate 250,000 passengers a day – comparable to Châtelet–Les Halles. Its platforms are located 27m below ground. The six tracks of Lines 14, 15, 16 and 17 will be on the same level, with a cross-platform interchange between lines 14 and 15, and between Line 15 and the shared track of lines 16/17. The station has 56 escalators and 17 elevators.

The station was designed by Japanese architect Kengo Kuma, who was selected following an international architectural competition. Over 100 sculptures of "prehistoric Venus" by French artist Prune Nourry will be installed in the station atrium by 2026. Murals by Spanish illustrator Sergio García Sánchez (with colouring by Lola Moral) are installed on the Line 14 platforms and murals by French artist Genevieve Gauckler will be installed on the platforms of lines 16 and 17.

The initial proposal for an artwork designed by Belgian singer, songwriter and rapper Stromae was abandoned after he withdrew for health reasons.

== History ==
=== Construction ===
The construction of the shared trunk of lines 16 and 17, which includes this station, was declared to be of public utility on 28 December 2015. Construction of the station began in March 2017 with preparatory work. Civil engineering began in April 2018 with the construction of the underground walls of the station. The €100 million contract for the station building itself was awarded to Besix in 2020. During construction, two workers died in separate incidents in 2020 and 2022.

The official name of the station was confirmed as Saint-Denis Pleyel following a public consultation in 2022. Other names considered included Carrefour Pleyel (after the nearby Line 13 station) and Ignace Pleyel (after composer and piano builder Ignace Pleyel). The station name was later written as Saint-Denis–Pleyel.

=== Opening ===
The station was opened on 24 June 2024 by French President Emmanuel Macron. The station opened in time for the Olympic Games and Paralympic Games. The station is operated by Keolis, which will also operate lines 16 and 17. During the Olympic and Paralympic Games, over 40,000 passengers were expected to use the station at peak times.
