= La Courneuve–Six Routes station =

Paris Metro station under construction on lines 16 and 17

La Courneuve–Six Routes is a station under construction of the Paris Metro on Line 16 and Line 17 in La Courneuve. The station is being built as part of the first shared section of these lines, between Saint-Denis–Pleyel and Le Bourget. It is scheduled to open in 2027.

A transfer to tramway line T1 will be opened.
