= Red Rocks (disambiguation) =

Red Rocks may refer to:

== Places ==
- Red Rock Canyon National Conservation Area near Las Vegas, Nevada
- Red Rocks (SSSI), an area of sand dunes and reedbeds in England
- Red Rocks, Newfoundland and Labrador, Canada
- Red Rocks, Scotland, a small group of rocky islands in Loch Sunart
- Red Rocks Park in Jefferson County, Colorado
- Red Rocks Amphitheatre, an open-air concert venue in Red Rocks Park
- Pariwhero / Red Rocks, a scientific reserve near Wellington, New Zealand

== Other ==
- Red Rocks (horse), 2006 Breeders' Cup winner
- Red Rocks Community College, Colorado
- Red Rocks Live: Neil Young, Friends & Relatives, a 2000 DVD/VHS video
- Utah Red Rocks, the University of Utah women's gymnastics team
- Red Rocks (film), 2026 French-language feature film

== See also ==
- Red Rock (disambiguation)
