= Basilique de Saint-Denis station =

Metro station in Paris, France

Basilique de Saint-Denis Hôtel de Ville
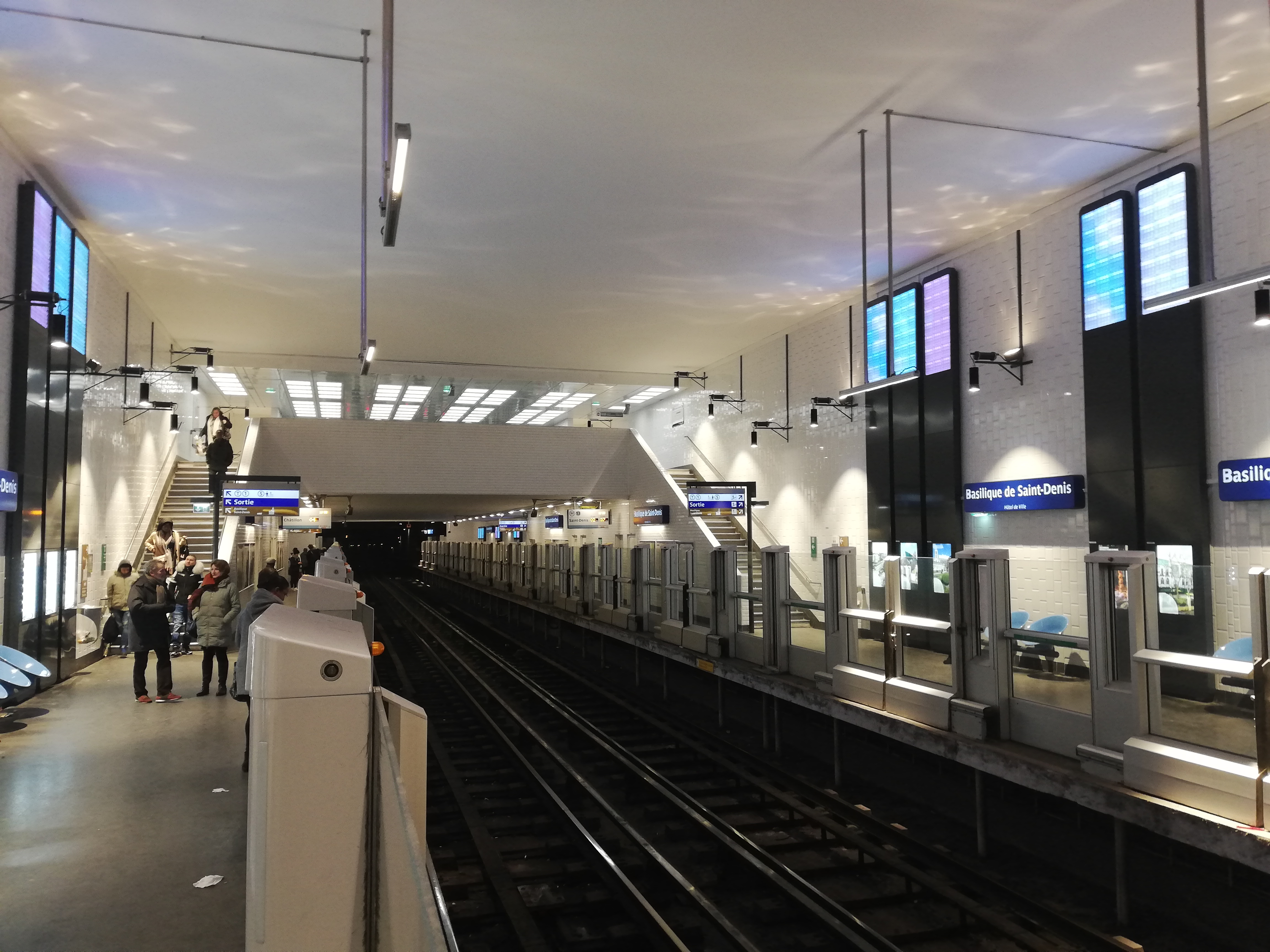

General information
- Location: Saint-Denis, Seine-Saint-Denis; Île-de-France; France
- Coordinates: 48°56′17″N 2°21′39″E
- System: Paris Métro station
- Owner: RATP
- Operator: RATP

Other information
- Fare zone: 1

History
- Opened: 20 June 1976

Services
Preceding station	Paris Metro	Following station
Saint-Denis–Porte de Paris towards Châtillon–Montrouge	Line 13 Saint-Denis branch	Saint-Denis–Université Terminus
Preceding station	Tram	Following station
Marché de Saint-Denis towards Asnières–Quatre Routes	T1	Cimetière de Saint-Denis towards Noisy-le-Sec
Location
- Location within Paris and inner ring

Basilique de Saint-Denis (French pronunciation: [bazilik də sɛ̃ dəni]) is a Paris Métro station on line 13 in the town centre of Saint-Denis, north of Paris. It connects with tram line 1 at two nearby stops at Basilique de Saint-Denis and Marché de Saint-Denis.

== History ==
The station opened on 26 May 1976 when the line was extended from Carrefour Pleyel. It was the northern terminus of the northern branch of the line until 25 May 1998 when it was extended to Saint-Denis - Université. It is named after the nearby basilica. However, the display of the new name in the station itself was not changed until later. It bears the subtitle Hôtel de Ville because it is located near the town hall of Saint-Denis. On 21 December 1992 tram line T1 opened. Since 2012, its platforms have been fitted with landing doors.

In 2015-2016, the station was the subject of major modernization works with the holding of the 2016 European Football Championship. The escalators, the ticket office and the automatic ticketing machines were renewed, the lighting of the facades on the platforms, old tiling removed and waterproofing of the station redone.

In 2020, with the Covid-19 crisis, 2,616,421 travellers entered this station, which places it at the 76th position of metro stations for its use.

== Passenger services ==
=== Access ===
The station offers two entrances.

- exit 1 - Passage de l'Aqueduc (gives access to the town hall of Saint-Denis), opens at the foot of the L'Écran cinema and leads to a connection with the tram T5 (stop Marché de Saint-Denis);
- exit 2 - Place du Caquet, which opens at the foot of the Basilica shopping centre and leads to a connection with the tram T1.

The 2018 renovation kept the escalator, which accessed the ticket room on the platform towards Saint-Denis-University but did not add a descending escalator on the other platform.

=== Station layout ===
G	Street Level	Exit/Entrance
B1	Mezzanine	Fare control, connection between platform
B2	Side platform, doors will open on the right
B2	Northbound	← toward Saint-Denis – Université (Terminus)
B2	Southbound	toward Châtillon – Montrouge (Saint-Denis – Porte de Paris) →
B2	Side platform, doors will open on the right

=== Platforms ===
Basilique de Saint-Denis is a standard configuration station with two platforms separated by metro tracks. They have a cultural decoration, in order to reflect the prestigious neighbourhood of the basilica and the historical character of Saint-Denis.

From 2015 to 2018, the station was renovated and its decoration modernised. The walls of the platforms were renewed using large-format bevelled earthenware tiles. The old marble-looking columns were revised with religious scenography and stained-glass windows imitating windows of the basilica-cathedral and highlighted by paving stones, fitted with light-emitting diodes (LEDs).

=== Other connections ===
Since 1992, a connection with the T1 tram has made it possible to reach, among other things, Saint-Denis station and the eastern part of downtown Saint-Denis.

The station is also served by lines 153, 239 (nearby) and 253 of the RATP Bus Network.

At a short distance (Cité Langevin stop), a connection is possible with line 255 of the RATP Bus Network, with line 11 of the CIF bus network (Marché de Saint-Denis stop) and, at night, with line N44 of the Noctilien bus network. Likewise, since 29 July 2013, travellers can join the T5 tram at the aforementioned stop.

== Nearby ==
- Saint-Denis city hall.
- Saint-Denis basilica, a cathedral built during the 12th century, one of the first in the Gothic cathedrals, containing the necropolis of the Kings of France.
- The house of honour of the Légion d'honneur and its park.
- Near one of the tram stops are two university schools, for technology and teacher training.
- This part of the town is a dense group of residential buildings, including shops and a commercial centre.
