= Musée d'art et d'histoire de Saint-Denis =

Museum in Saint-Denis, France

Coordinates: 48°55′56″N 2°21′23″E

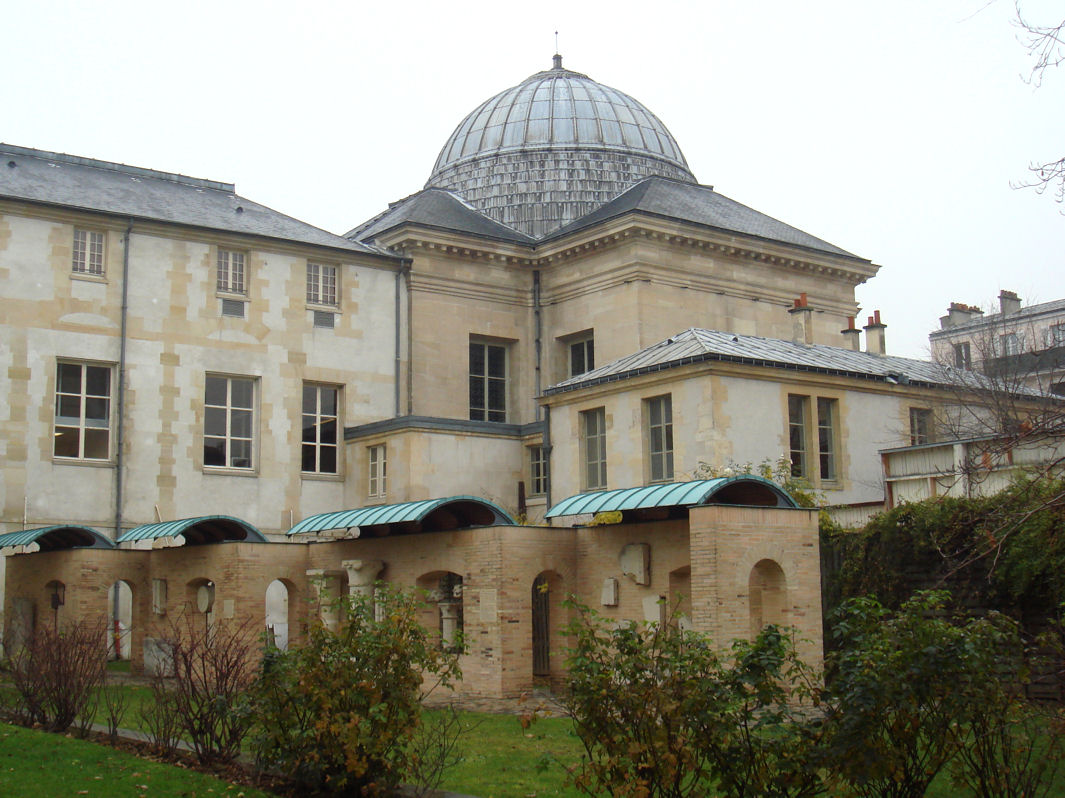
The Musée d'art et d'histoire in Saint-Denis

The Musée d'art et d'histoire Paul-Éluard (English: Museum of Art and History Paul Éluard) is a museum in Saint-Denis, France, in the northern outskirts of Paris.

== History ==
The museum was founded in 1901 and was located in the former hôtel-Dieu of the town. When this building was demolished, the museum was rehoused in the municipal library. At the beginning of the 1980s the museum moved into a Carmelite nunnery, winning the European Museum of the Year Award in 1982.

== Buildings ==
The repurposed buildings of the nunnery include cloisters, cells and a chapel built by Louis XV, whose daughter Louise of France was a Discalced Carmelite.

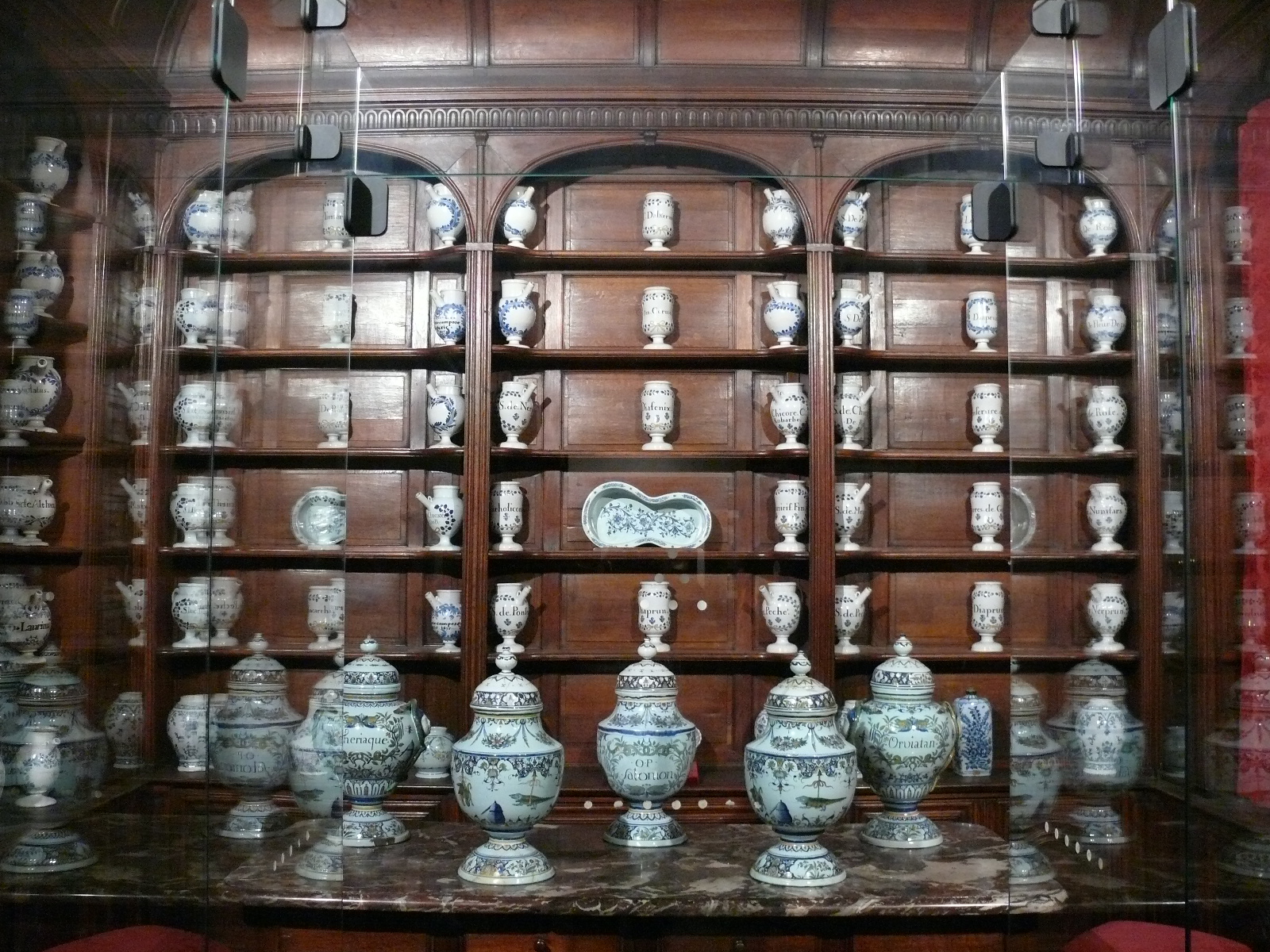
Pharmacy of the hotel Dieu, which has been re-assembled in the museum.

== Collections ==
The museum holds displays about the Carmelites, the Paris Commune and the surrealist poet, Paul Éluard. There is also an archaeological department focusing on the ancient finds in and around the Basilique Saint-Denis.

From September to December 2007, the museum had a display about the Silk Road, entitled "Marco Polo et le Livre des Merveilles".

Recommended access is underground Metro station Saint-Denis Porte de Paris, on Line 13, located about 100 meters south of the museum.

== Gallery ==
(Temporary Marco Polo exhibit, September–December 2007)

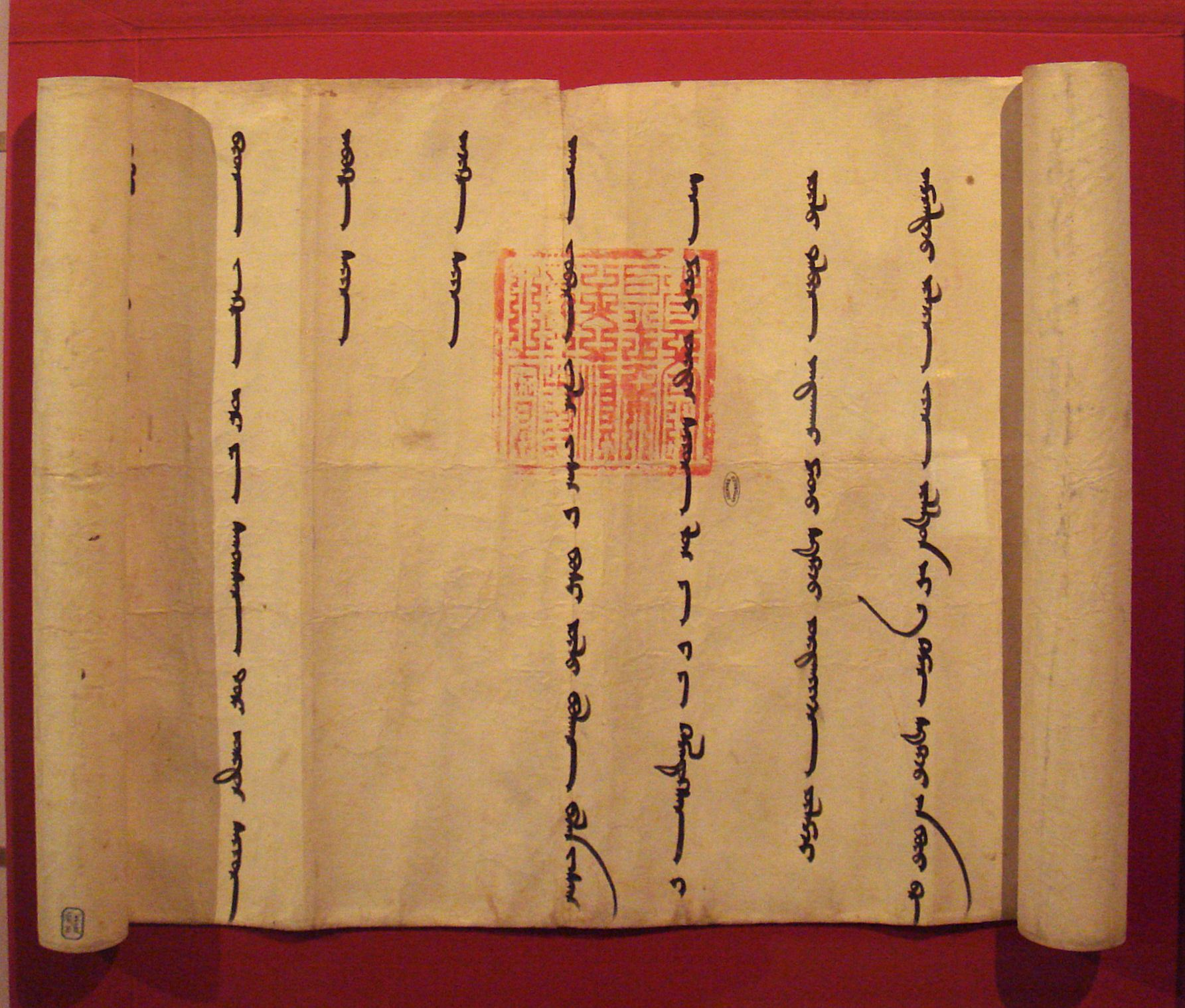
Letter of Oljeitu to Philippe le Bel, 1305. Temporary loan from the Bibliothèque Nationale.

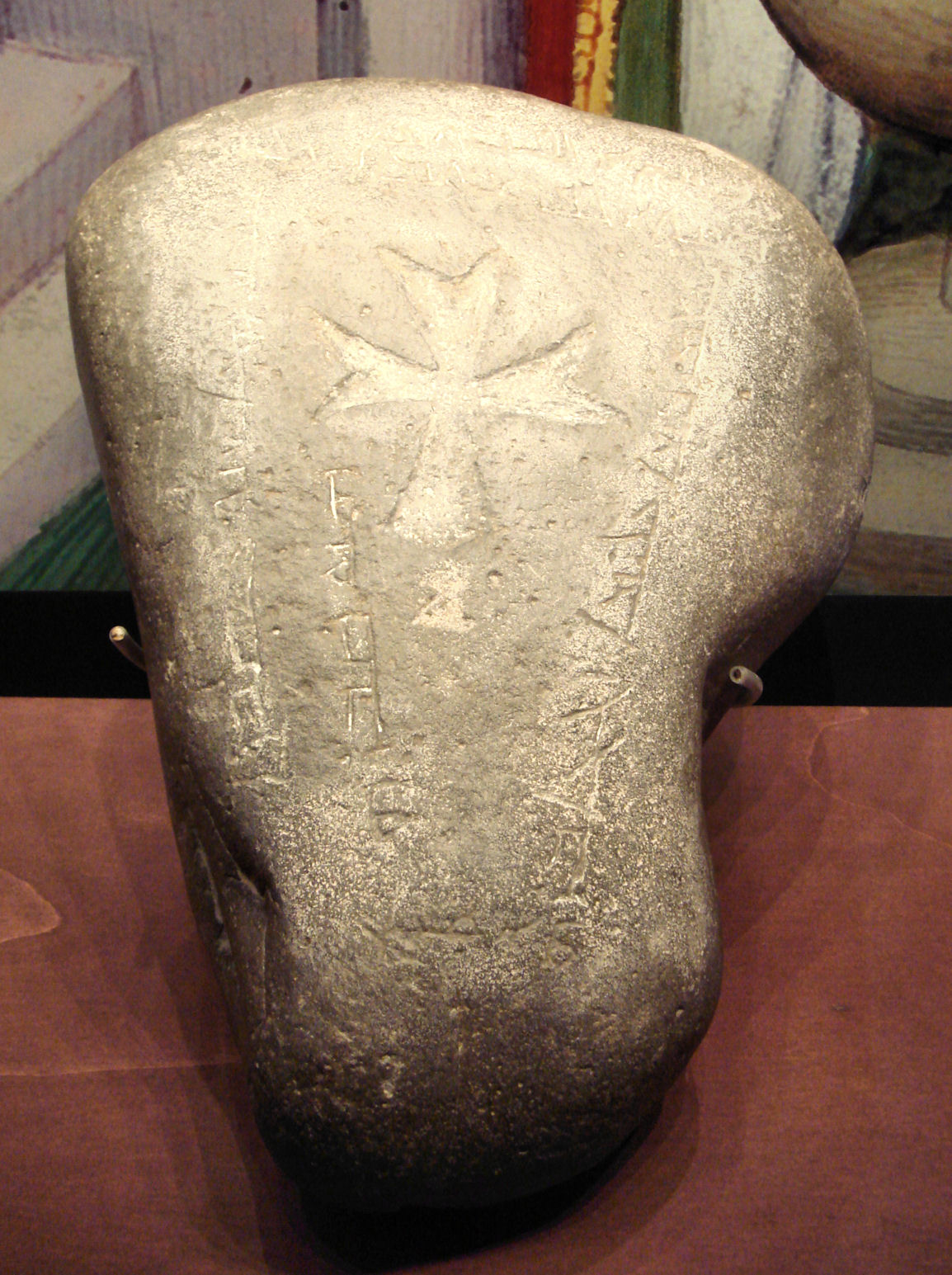
Nestorian tombstone from Issyk Kul, dated 1312. Temporary loan from Musée Guimet.

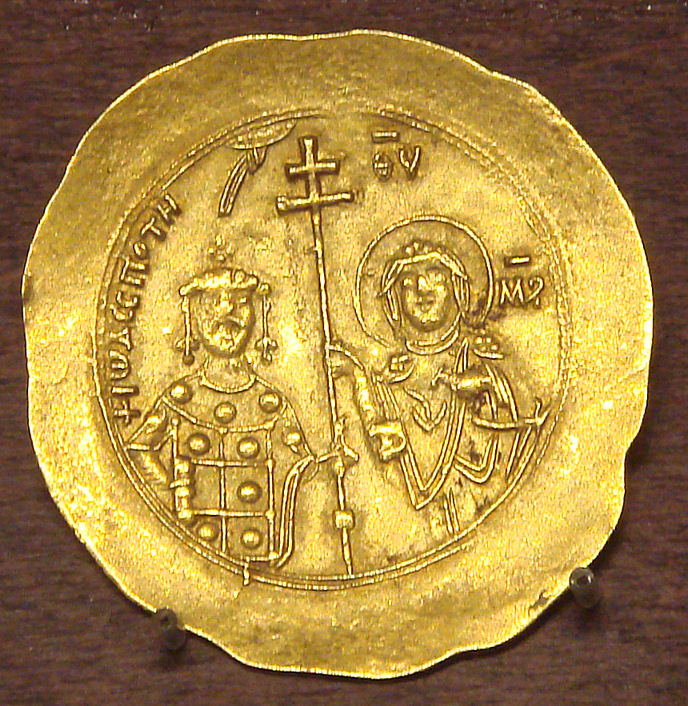
Silver coin of John II Komnenos.

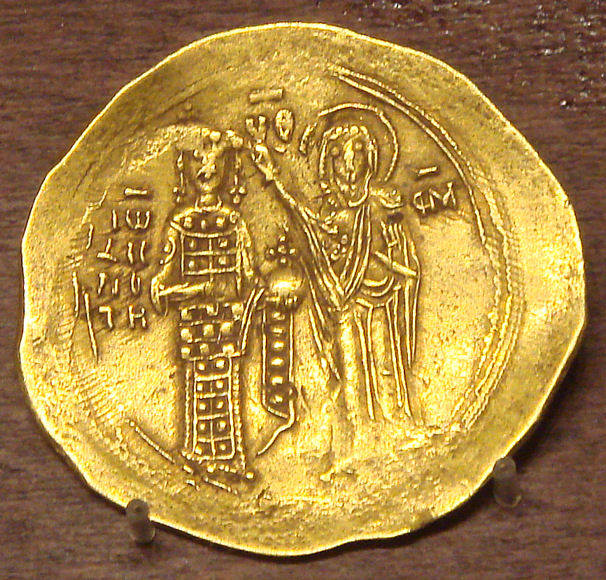
Another coin of John II Komnenos.

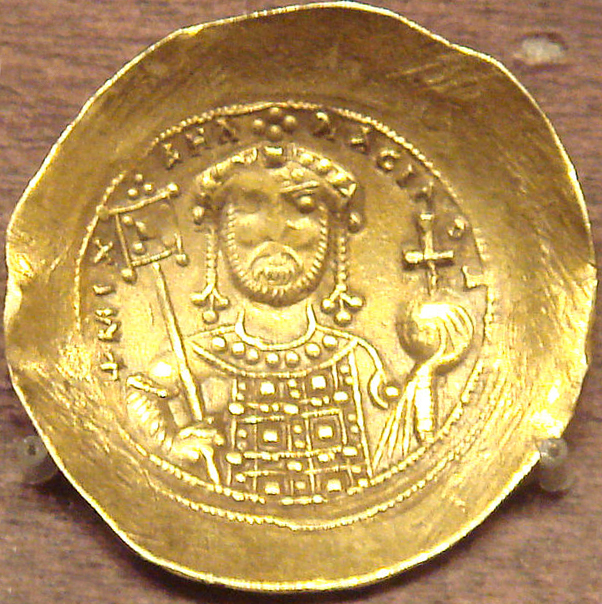
Nomisma of Michael VII Doukas.

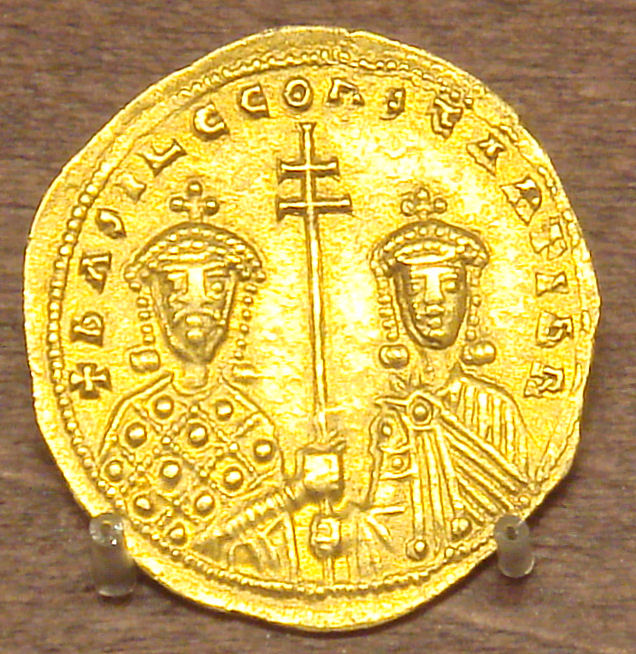
Basil II and Constantine VIII.
