= Île-de-France tramway Line 1 =

Suburban tram line in Hauts-de-Seine and Seine-Saint-Denis, north of Paris

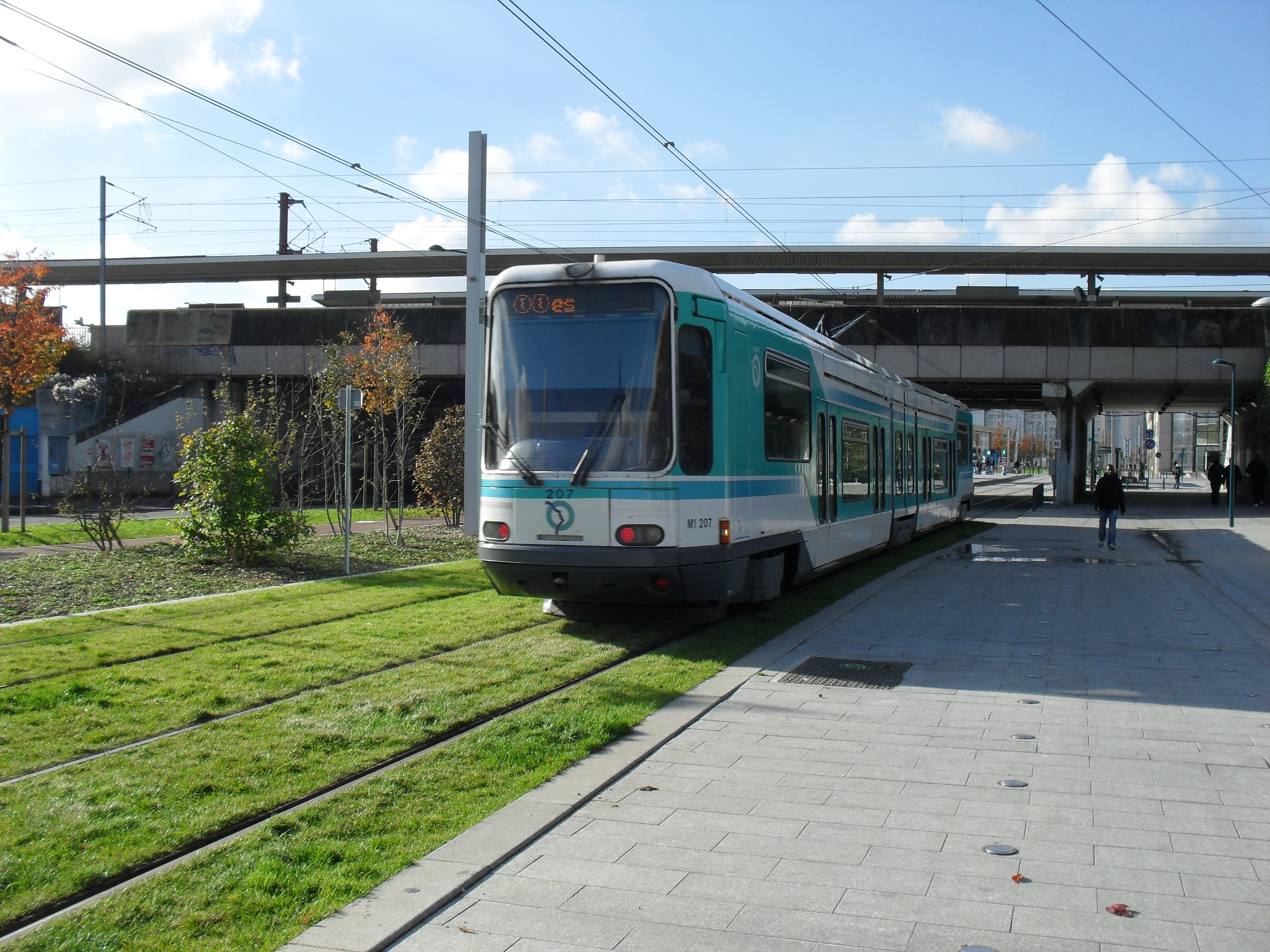
- Île-de-France tramway Line 1 operating over green track approaches Gennevilliers station

Overview
- Owner: Île-de-France Mobilités
- Termini: Asnières – Quatre Routes; Gare de Noisy-le-Sec
- Stations: 37

Service
- Type: Tram
- System: Tramways in Île-de-France
- Operator: RATP Group
- Rolling stock: Citadis 305 (TW20) (36 vehicles as of 27 December 2025)
- Ridership: 51,000,000 per year (2022)

History
- Opened: 6 July 1992; 34 years ago

Technical
- Line length: 17 km (11 mi)
- Track gauge: 1,435 mm (4 ft 8 1/2 in) standard gauge
Route map

Île-de-France tramway Line 1 (usually called simply T1) is part of the modern tram network of the Île-de-France region of France. Line T1 connects Noisy-le-Sec station and Asnières-sur-Seine with a suburban alignment running in parallel to the Northern city limits of Paris. The line has a length of 17 km (11 mi) and 36 stations. It opened in 1992 as the first modern tram line in the Paris region. The line was extended in December 2003 and November 2012. Daily ridership reaches 188,000 passengers (in 2015) making it the second busiest line of the tram network.

The line has been operated by the RATP Group since its opening, under the authority of Île-de-France Mobilités. Future operation of line will become subject to a competitive bidding process in November 2029.

A 1-stop extension to the west towards Quatre Routes opened to the public in mid-2019. A further extension to the west towards Colombes (which would allow for a transfer with Line T2) is currently at the planning stage. To the east a planned extension towards Val de Fontenay, which has been blocked for several years due to strong opposition from the municipality of Noisy-le-Sec, will finally be constructed in two stages with the first phase connecting Noisy-le-Sec station to Montreuil (Rue de Rosny) only.

== History ==
=== Timeline ===
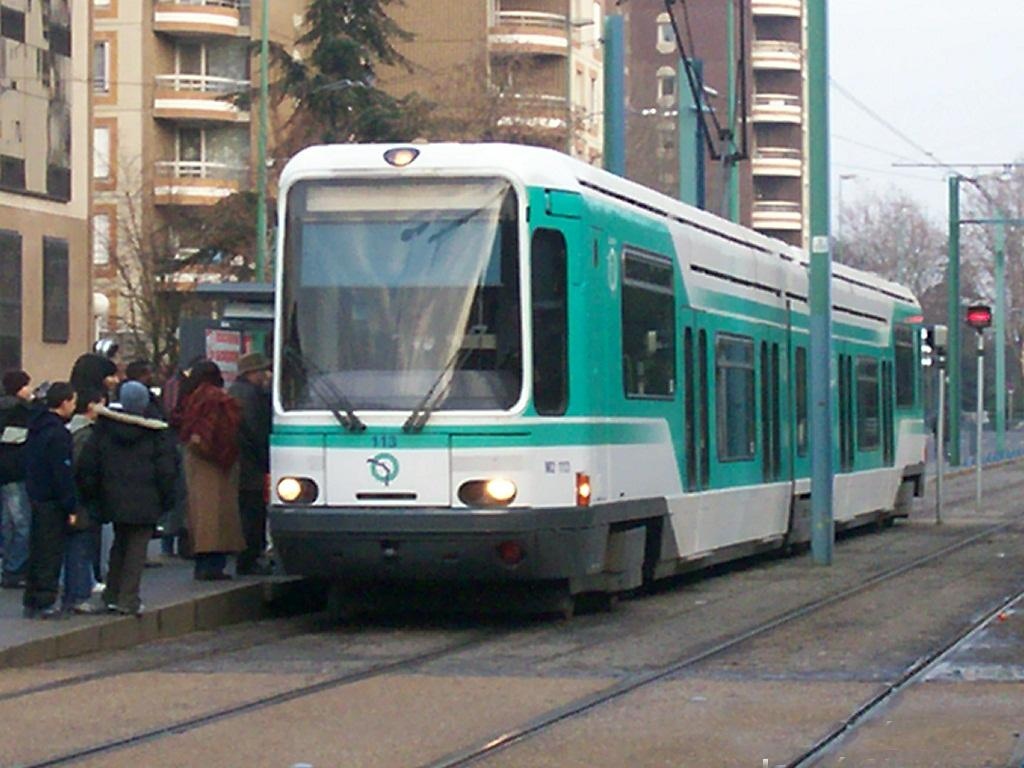
Tram on Line T1 in Bobigny

- 6 July 1992: Start of service between Bobigny-Pablo Picasso and La Courneuve-8 Mai 1945
- 15 December 1992: Extension towards the west from La Courneuve–8 Mai 1945 to Saint-Denis station
- 15 December 2003: Extension towards the east from Bobigny-Pablo Picasso to Gare de Noisy-le-Sec
- 15 November 2012: Extension towards the west from Saint-Denis station to Les Courtilles
- 12 October 2019: Extension towards the west from Les Courtilles to Asnières-Quatre Routes

=== Rebirth of the tramway ===
Île-de-France tramway Line 1 marked the return to this type of transportation, having been absent in the region since 1957, (Note: The last tramway had operated in Paris proper in 1937, and the last tramline in the region operated to Versailles until 1957.) and was the result of a long battle between the Seine-Saint-Denis General Council and the towns through which it would pass. In July 1976, the schéma directeur d'aménagement et d'urbanisme de la région parisienne ("Organizing Plan for the Development and Urbanism of the Region of Paris") caused the creation of ring roads to the north and south of the agglomeration to facilitate links between different suburbs for which there was a constantly increasing demand. A schéma directeur des sites propres ("Directing plan for dedicated lines") was created by the RATP in response to a request from the direction régionale de l'Équipement d'Île-de-France ("Regional direction for equipment of Î-d-F"). It notably discussed the issue of traffic congestion on Route nationale 186 (N186) which would be greatly relieved by the creation of the A86 autoroute.

In 1977, the Institut d'aménagement et d'urbanisme de la région d'Île-de-France ("Institute for the Management and Urbanism of the Île-de-France Region"; IAURIF) was given a mission by the direction régionale de l'Équipement to study the creation of two structural ring roads in the suburbs, one of which was to connect the business district of La Défense in the west to the capital of Seine-Saint-Denis, Bobigny, in the east. The Institute proposed that they use a tramway, which has a greater capacity than the bus and has numerous other advantages such as less noise, no pollution, adaptability to future traffic situation and accessibility for the disabled due to its lower platform. The tramway seemed to be the perfect solution for suburb-to-suburb connections since the lower ridership could never justify creating a metro line but was too high for a simple bus line.

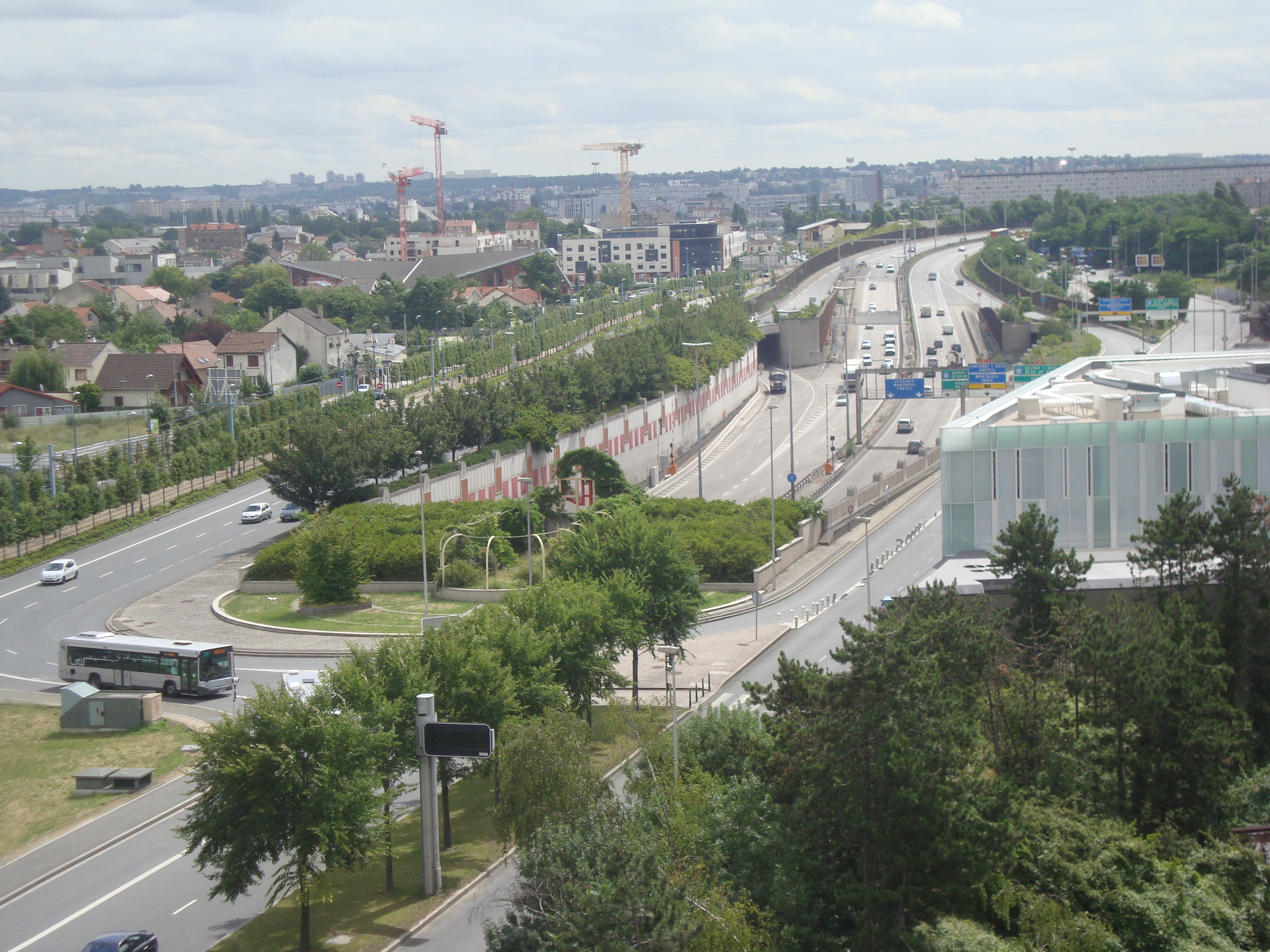
Ramp of A86 autoroute at Bobigny in July 2010

In 1980, the IAURIF studied more specifically the connection between Saint-Denis and Bobigny, the first section of the ring in partnership with the RATP which still had some reservations about using this mode of transportation since the expected ridership seemed like it might not be sufficient to ensure the profitability of a tramway. The Seine-Saint-Denis General Council argued strongly in favour of the project especially since the national political shift towards the Left in May 1981 favoured such an outcome.

In 1982, the RATP, in cooperation with the direction départementale de l'Équipement of Seine-Saint-Denis, commissioned a preliminary feasibility study on a tramway project which would primarily serve the nearby suburban areas that were mostly populated but were affected by deindustrialization and population decline. The proposed route had connections with three metro lines and one train station, which made it more attractive in combining the ring road service with being a feeder for the radial lines from downtown Paris. The first version of the proposal was presented in March to April 1983. The IAURIF boasted its commitment to "intermediate solutions between heavy rail systems and bus networks, victims of overcrowding." Nonetheless, the institute left the choice of mode of transportation on the table, only indicating its preference for electrically powered transportation which effectively meant a choice between the tramway and the trolleybus.

A comparison was then given between three different solutions: a tramway, an articulated bus and an articulated trolleybus. The study showed that the installation of a tramway would initially cost the most, but its operational cost per passenger would be lower after the first year and would attract more passengers. The balance sheet would be positive for this mode of transportation in less than 12 months of operation. The proposal highlighted the attractiveness of the modern tramway to the public. Its effect on urban planning was equally demonstrated with the rehabilitation of the neighbourhoods it served and reduced usage of the highways. On 28 October 1983 the proposal was approved by the conseil d'administration of the RATP. It was cosigned by the RATP and the DDE 93 in April 1984 and was also approved by the STIF. The project was thus included in regional planning.

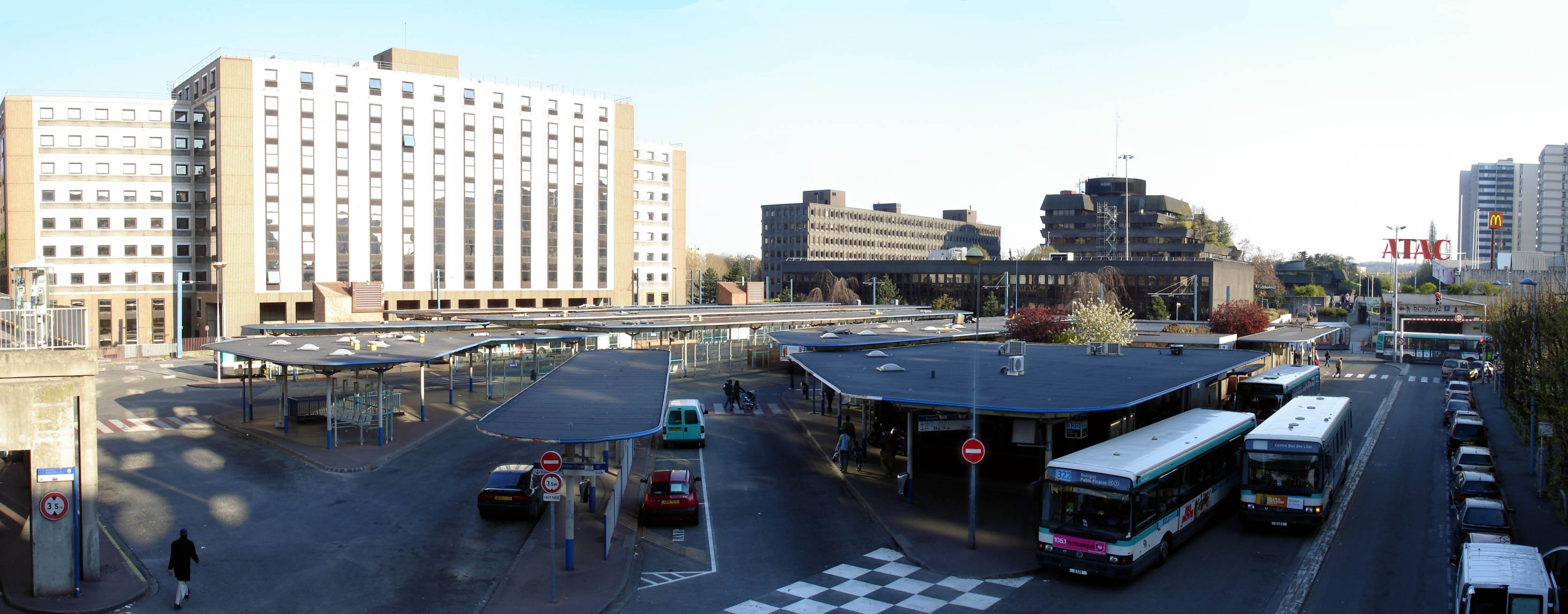
The multimodal hub of Bobigny–Pablo Picasso in April 2007

The expected ridership was 55,000 passengers per day on average, or an annual ridership of 15 million passengers, with a minimum frequency of one train every four minutes during rush hour and an expected average speed of 19 kilometres per hour (12 mph). The cost of building the infrastructure was estimated on 1 January 1983 to be 470 million francs (about 71.65 million euro or 93.5 million US dollars) and the cost of the train equipment to be 135 million francs (about 20.58 million euro or 26.87 million US dollars). The proposed tramway line had transfer points with line 5 of the Paris metro at Bobigny–Pablo Picasso station, with line 7 (via a May 1987 extension) at La Courneuve-8 Mai 1945, with line 13 at Basilique de Saint-Denis (with a walking transfer) and with RER line D at Saint-Denis railway station. It was 9.1 kilometres (5.7 mi) long and served 22 stations. It was greatly influenced by the Tramway Français Standard of Nantes which had been very successful.

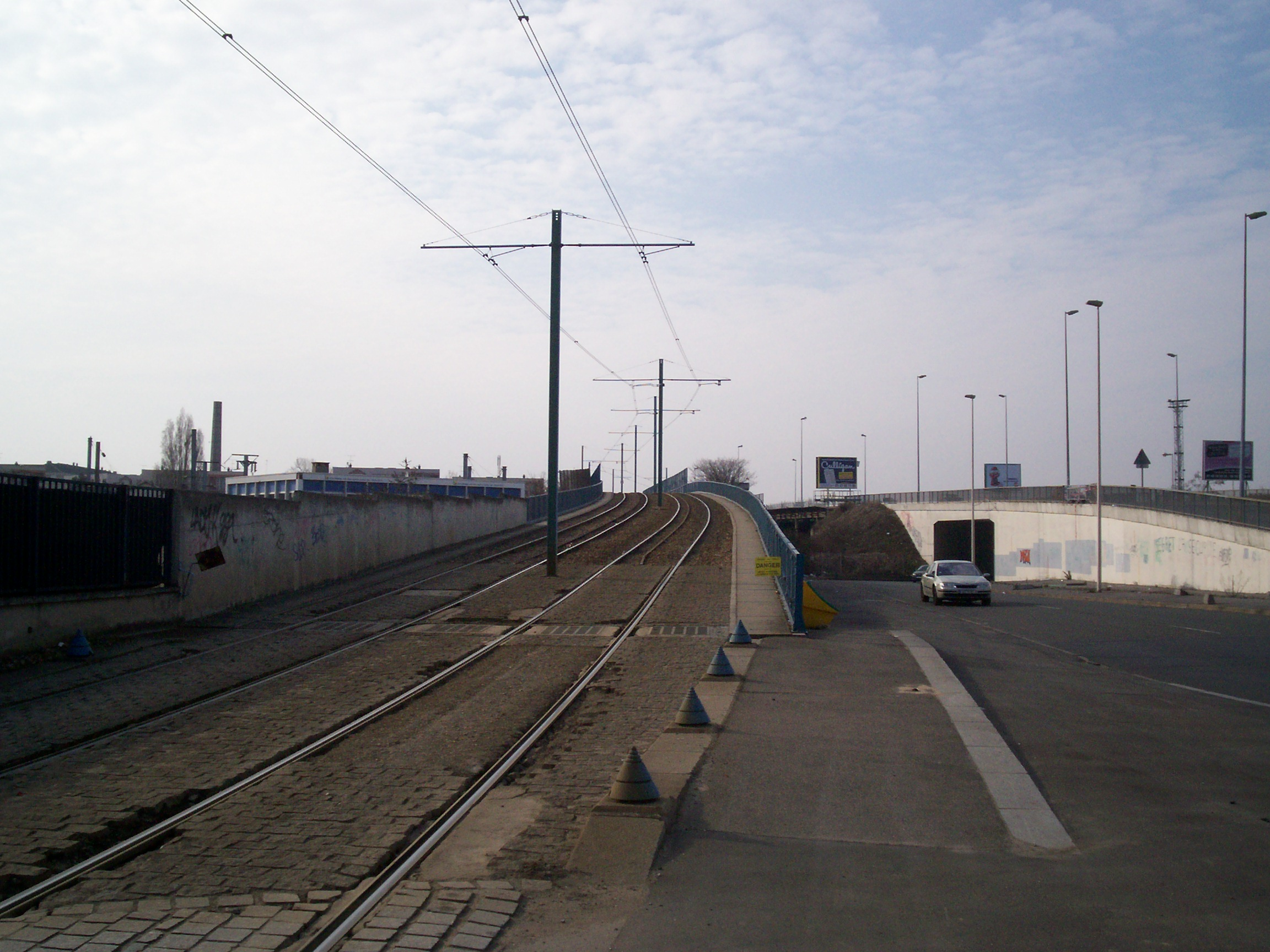
Crossing the Grande Ceinture line at Bobigny in March 2006

Funding was provided with the regional planning contract of 1984. The project, re-estimated to cost 520 million francs (about 79.3 million euro or 103.5 million US dollars), received 50% of its funding from the state, 42.8% from the region and 7.2% from the département, the latter covering the extra cost of building a tramway over other transportation options. The public consultation took place in July 1984 and in August the result was response was published as being favourable. The RATP became in charge of operating the new line and it was declared to be a public utility on 19 December 1984. Construction was estimated to be completed in 1988. Ultimately responsibility for the project was adopted by the STIF with some minor modifications in October 1985, resulting in a final price tag of 535 million francs before tax (about 81.56 million euro or 106.48 million US dollars). With these final modifications, the line was aimed towards the commune of L'Île-Saint-Denis. The line would have to cross the commune but opposition at the time from the Hauts-de-Seine General Council caused the line to end at Saint-Denis railway station.

=== Political shifts and re-evaluation of the project ===
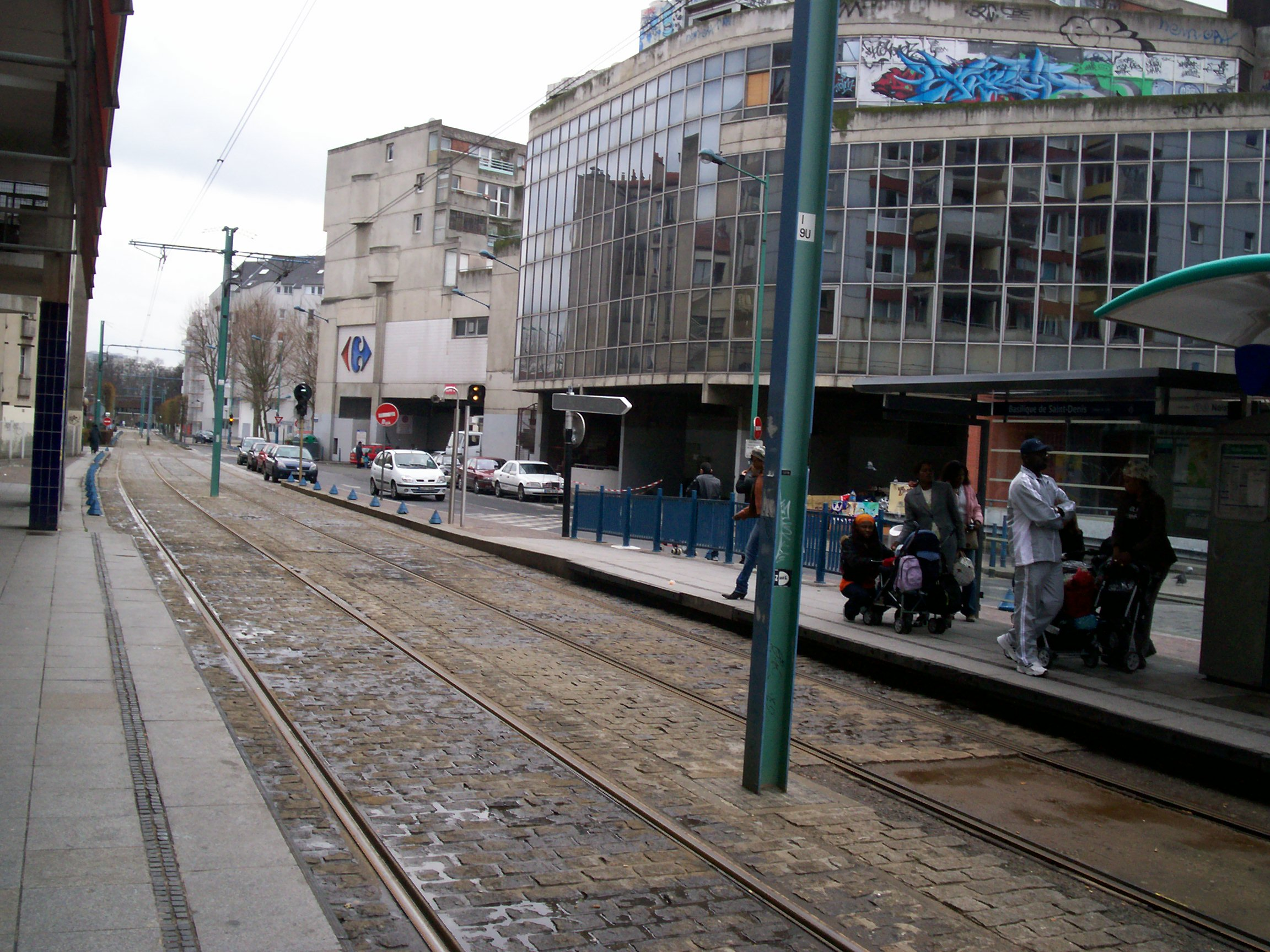
Line 1 tracks in Saint-Denis, Seine-Saint-Denis

The March 1986 legislative elections put the Right in power and combined the politics of the State and the regions. The conservative agenda of the new government put the project in great danger due to their tendency to reduce public spending. The tramway once again caused a debate over its real efficiency. The RATP once again commissioned studies for the government and sent its report to Minister of Transportation Jacques Douffiagues in June 1987. It concluded that it would be possible to replace the tramway with a dedicated bus lane, but this method presented three problems: lower performance in terms of speed and frequency, restarting the whole bureaucratic process over again (which would result in great delays), and finally if the local governments disagreed it could mean they would have to look for new funding.

Financially, replacing the tramway with a dedicated bus line would reduce infrastructure costs by 36-45%. The purchase of bus-type rolling stock would also be significantly lower, going from 238 million francs to 45 million francs, respectively, for the tramway and the bus. However, the balance sheet for the tramway solution is positive, with higher operating results. The tramway turned out to be the more attractive option, and the rolling stock has a significantly longer lifespan. RATP therefore maintained its preference for the tramway mode.

A new national political alternation took place in 1988. On July 21 of that year, the board of directors of the Fonds de développement économique et social (FDES; Economic and Social Development Fund) decided to release 110 million francs (or 16.77 million euros) to finance the project, which was by that point scheduled to be put into service by the end of 1992, more than eight years behind the initial forecast of 1984. The RATP was designated as the project owner, and assisted by several others: DDE 93, technical services of the municipalities of Bobigny and Saint-Denis, and the SNCF for the crossing structure of the Grande Ceinture line at Bobigny. A landscaping programme with treatment of the facades was implemented in parallel by the General Council, with the planting of trees and specific street furniture, designed by the Chemetov-Huidobro firm. The work to divert the concessionaires' structures was undertaken from April 1989, and then those of the infrastructure from May 1990.

=== The opening of T1 ===
The line was put into service in two stages during 1992. The satisfactory progress of the work allowed the opening of a first section of 3,600 meters on 6 July 1992, between Bobigny-Pablo Picasso and La Courneuve-8 Mai 1945.

The second section of 5,400 meters was put into service on 21 December 1992, between La Courneuve-May 8, 1945 and Saint-Denis station. However, a cost overrun of 94 million francs required additional financing.

The operating results were then closely monitored, to confirm - or not - the relevance of the choice of the tramway mode. An initial investigation, from October 1992, counts 19,000 daily travelers. In March 1993, three months after its full opening, traffic had already reached 52,500 passengers per day, a figure close to the initial forecast of 55,000 passengers. Since then, attendance had continued to grow: 80,000 daily passengers in November 2000, then 98,900 six months after the inauguration of the Bobigny – Noisy-le-Sec section, and finally, 115,000 travelers in March 2007. On this date, the two busiest stations are La Courneuve - May 8, 1945 and Bobigny - Pablo Picasso. The load is uniform in both directions due to the balance of exchanges at the station and the traffic is regular all day long. The interval is 5 minutes and 30 seconds, and the commercial speed is 17 km/h, compared to 11 km/h for the bus. The new line therefore constitutes a qualitative leap and an effective urban planning tool.

=== Renovation and modernization of the line ===
From 25 June to 3 September 2001, the T1 line was interrupted along its entire route, in order to allow major renovation work to be carried out.

The platforms were rebuilt following some subsidence in several places. The traffic light priority system was to be installed at intersections, with the long-term objective of reducing journey times by 10%, enabled by a hoped-for increase in average commercial speed of 2 km/h (from 17 to 19 km/h). The track plan for the rear station of the Bobigny - Pablo Picasso terminus has been reworked, in anticipation of the extension of the line to Noisy-le-Sec, with in particular the installation of a triangle junction allowing trains to enter and leave the Bobigny depot from any direction (Saint-Denis or Noisy) · . In addition, the points were replaced and a parking drawer was added along rue Erik-Satie, in order to allow the circulation of "partial services" and to improve regularity in the event of an incident.

This work, carried out in 2024 and 2025, also made it possible to redesign the Hôtel de Ville station in La Courneuve. Located on the central reservation of the National Road 186, it had to be built with a single central platform serving both tracks, due to the narrow width of the street at that location. This configuration ended up making it dangerous as traffic increased. The adjacent traffic lanes are two single-track lanes in order to create two half-stations, as on the rest of the line, (Note: Half a station in each direction of traffic.) offset.

At stops, the first-generation "Alexis" waiting-time-announcement system has been replaced by the SIEL system, which is more efficient and easier to read. The first-generation ticket machines have also been replaced by more modern ones, capable of issuing all types of transport tickets and not just single or booklet tickets. The shelters at the ten busiest stations: Gare de Saint-Denis, Théâtre Gérard Philipe, Basilique de Saint-Denis, La Courneuve-Six Routes, Hôtel de Ville de La Courneuve, La Courneuve-May 8, 1945, and Bobigny-Pablo Picasso have been completely renovated.

During this period, to ensure continuity of service, the trams were replaced by articulated buses. They ran up to every four minutes during peak periods, compared to six minutes for the tram, so as to offer a generally unchanged carrying capacity. Where possible, the stops for the replacement buses were positioned in the immediate vicinity of the tram stations, except in Saint-Denis because of the one-way system and the narrowness of certain streets used by the tram. The bus replacement led to an increase in journey time, of the order of ten minutes.

=== The first extension: from Bobigny to Noisy-le-Sec ===
The first stage of the eastern extension of the line towards Montreuil is included in the State-region plan contract for 1994-1998. This first section which links Bobigny to the Noisy-le-Sec station, at a cost of 28.5 million euros, allows a connection to the RER E (first opened in 1999), and better service to public facilities in Bobigny and Noisy-le-Sec. The outline plan was approved in April 1997 and the declaration of public utility is pronounced in April 1999.

On 15 December 2003, the line was extended by 2.9 kilometers to reach Noisy-le-Sec station, after serving five new stations: Jean Rostand, Auguste Delaune, Pont de Bondy, Petit Noisy and Noisy-le-Sec. The route of the extension uses almost entirely the urban road network on its own site, with the exception of a bridge created from scratch over the Ourcq Canal. Initially, the Jean Rostand station was only to open when the line was extended south of Noisy-le-Sec station, but the expected volume of traffic and the delay accumulated by the works favored its opening at the same time as the rest of the extension.

The Pont de Bondy station was built at the top of very steep ramps created to allow crossing of the Ourcq Canal. The Petit Noisy station has staggered platforms, taking into account the narrow width of the road. Finally, the Gare de Noisy-le-Sec terminus was built in a temporary configuration with a minimalist track plan, in order to prepare for the extension towards the south already envisaged.

Since then, the T1 line has served twenty-six stations and carried an average of 100,000 passengers each working day in 2003, a weekday attendance which reached 115,000 passengers per day in 2008.

=== Renewal of the Tracks ===
Victims of premature wear due in particular to a traffic volume (115,000 passengers per day) which largely exceeded expectations, the line's oldest tracks were changed from east to west during construction works organized from the summer of 2006 to 2010, the trams being, during these periods, replaced by articulated buses · · . The construction of the summer of 2010 allowed the replacement of 3,600 metres (11,800 ft) of rails, which is planned to last thirty years.

Due to the immediate proximity of the housing in the ZAC (Zone d'aménagement concerté) in the city centre of Saint-Denis, a reinforced anti-vibration installation was chosen. Each rail coupon laid is enclosed in a concrete beam, from which it is insulated by a rubber envelope. Each longitudinal beam is placed on beams perpendicular to the track, from which it is insulated by another rubber strip. The 8 metres (26 ft) coupons are then welded together and the track covering is placed between the rails.

In areas less sensitive to vibrations, prefabricated factory-made slabs are simply inserted into the concrete bed between the two lines of rails on one of the tracks, in order to complete the platform and its traditional paved appearance. This installation is very different from the initial installation of the line, where granite paving stones had been laid in the traditional manner when the platform was completed, but had not resisted the rutting of the track.

=== In 2024, The Replacement of T1's Rolling Stock ===
The date of 10 December 2024 marked the start of the commissioning of the Alstom Citadis 305 intended to gradually replace the previous TFS-2 vehicles The advanced age of those TFS vehicles earned them the nickname "Jurassic Tram", inspired by the film Jurassic Park.

== Route and Stations ==
The T1 line is 17 kilometers (11 miles) long. It runs on its own right-of-way, except in the Village of Gennevilliers (between the Le Village and Timbaud stations) and L'Île-Saint-Denis, where the tracks are generally mixed with car traffic. From Saint-Denis to Noisy, concrete blocks or low walls prevent motorists from accessing the tram platform.
