= Red Rock, Arizona =

Red Rock, Arizona may refer to:

- Red Rock, Apache County, Arizona, an unincorporated community in Apache County
- Red Rock, Pinal County, Arizona, an unincorporated community in Pinal County
- Red Rock, Yavapai County, Arizona, an unincorporated community in Yavapai County
