= Red Rock River =

The Red Rock River may refer to:

- Red Rock River (Montana), US
- Red Rock River (New South Wales) in New South Wales, Australia
- Red Rock River (Ontario) in Ontario, Canada
- Red Rock River (Kokang) in Kokang Special Region, Burma
