= Île-de-France tramway Line 8 =

Suburban tram line in Seine-Saint-Denis, north of Paris

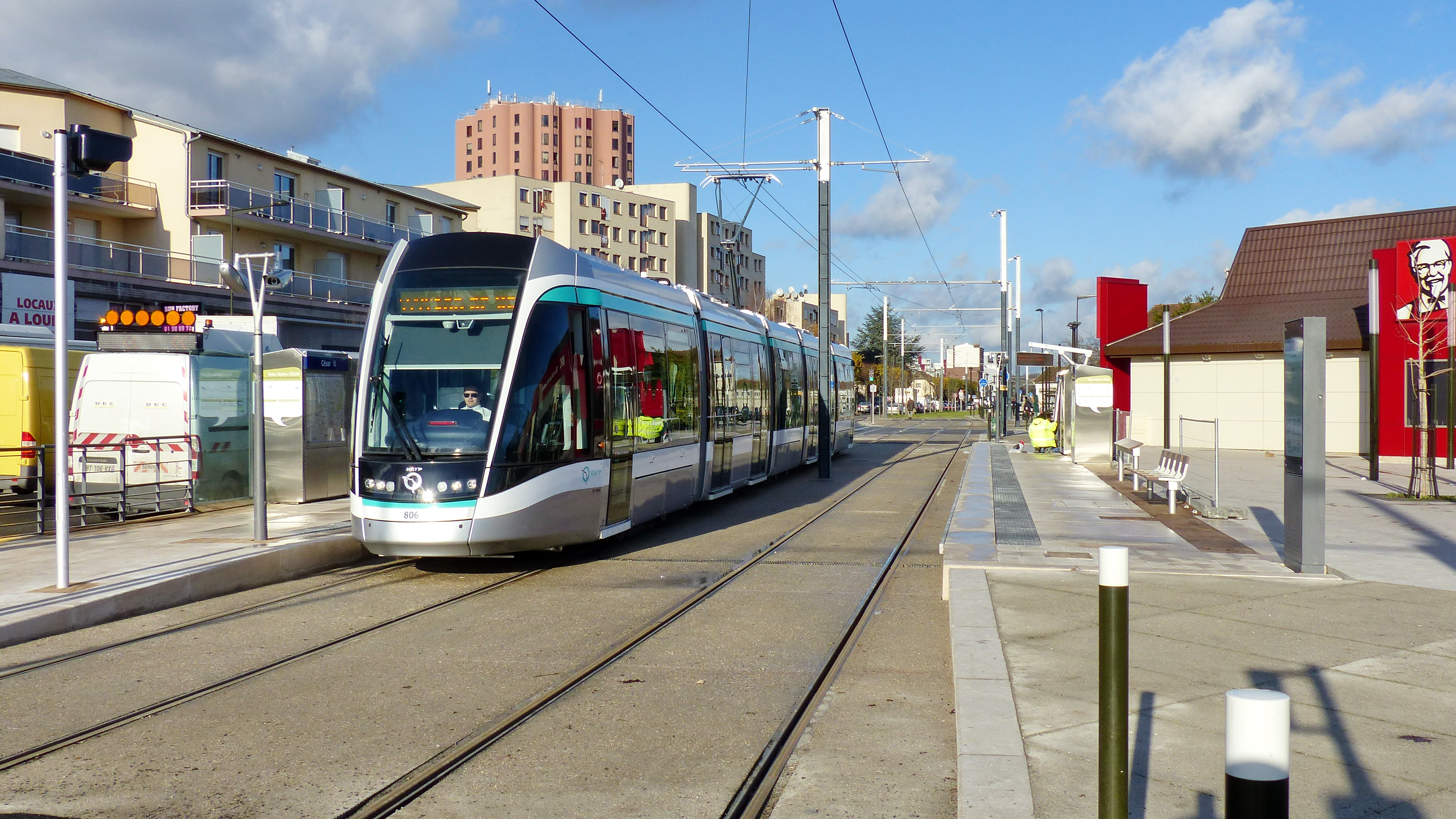
- Île-de-France tramway Line 8 at César station

Overview
- Owner: Île-de-France Mobilités
- Termini: Villetaneuse–Université or Épinay–Orgemont; Saint-Denis–Porte de Paris
- Stations: 17

Service
- Type: Tram
- System: Tramways in Île-de-France
- Operator: RATP Group
- Rolling stock: 20 Alstom Citadis
- Daily ridership: 55,000

History
- Opened: 16 December 2014; 11 years ago

Technical
- Line length: 8.46 km (5.26 mi)
- Track gauge: 1,435 mm (4 ft 8 1/2 in) standard gauge
Route map

Île-de-France tramway Line 8 (usually called simply T8, also known as Tram'y in project phase) is part of the modern tram network of the Île-de-France region of France. Line 8 connects two branches beginning at Villetaneuse-Université station and Épinay-Orgemont and Saint-Denis–Porte de Paris Paris Métro station in Saint-Denis, in the northern suburbs of Paris. The line has a length of 8.46 km (5.26 mi) and 17 stations. It opened to the public on 16 December 2014.

The line is operated by the RATP Group under contract with Île-de-France Mobilités.

The tramway is expected to be extended South to Rosa Parks station by 2031, with works beginning in 2027.
