= Red Rock Lake =

Red Rock Lake, Redrock Lake or Lake Red Rock appears in the names of at least 19 geographic entities. Among these are:

- Lake Red Rock (Des Moines River), a reservoir on the Des Moines River, southwest of Des Moines, Iowa
- Red Rock Lakes Wilderness, in Montana
- Redrock Lake is a lake in Glacier National Park, Montana
