= Saint-Denis station =

French train stop

Saint-Denis L'Île-Saint-Denis
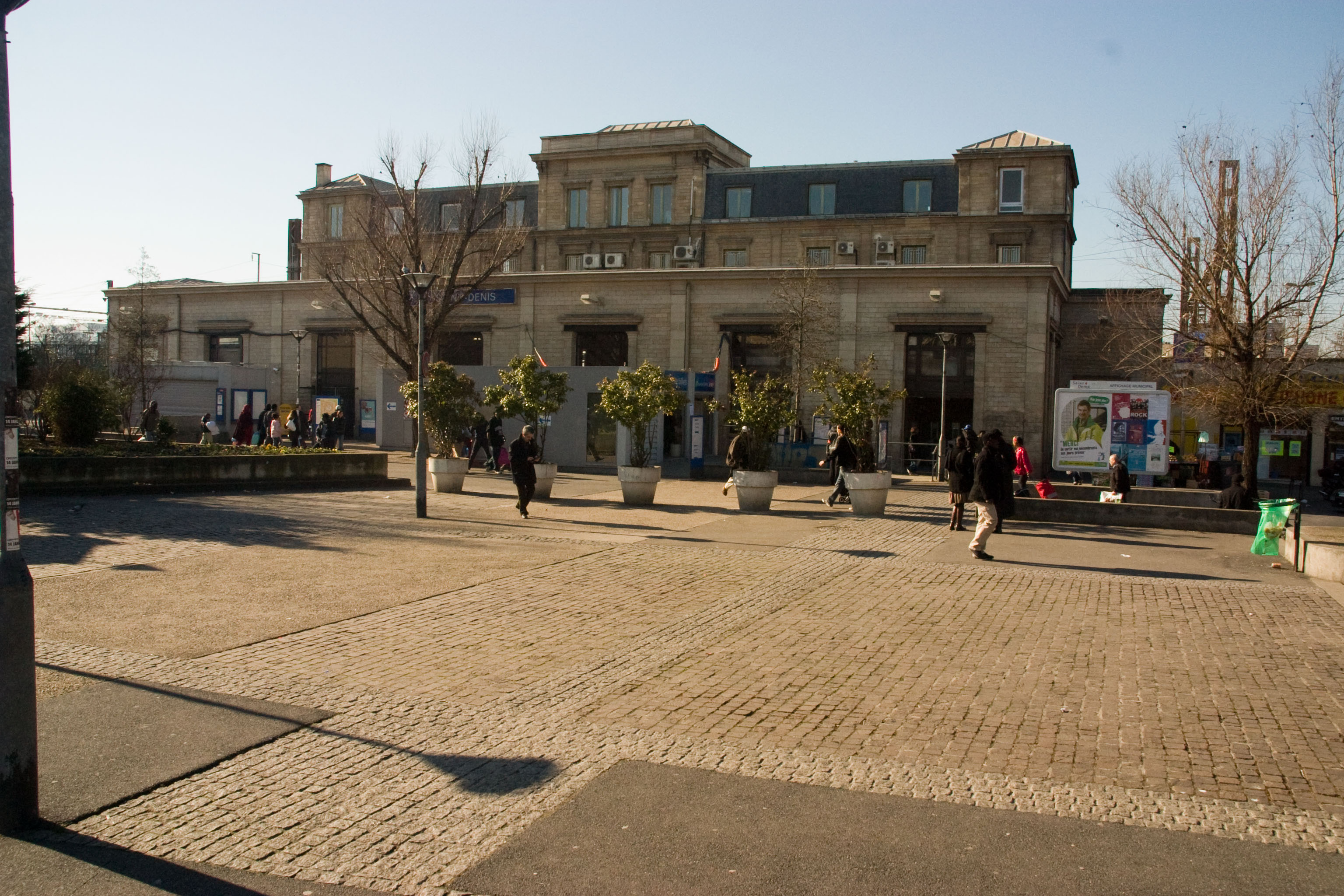
- Saint-Denis station

General information
- Location: 1 Place des Victimes du 17 Octobre 1961; Saint-Denis, France
- Coordinates: 48°56′07″N 2°20′44″E
- Elevation: 37 m (121 ft)
- Owner: SNCF
- Operator: SNCF
- Lines: Paris–Lille railway Saint-Denis–Dieppe railway
- Platforms: 5
- Tracks: 8
- Connections: Tramways in Île-de-France Île-de-France tramway Line 1 Île-de-France tramway Line 8

Construction
- Structure type: At-grade
- Accessible: No

Other information
- Station code: 87271015
- Fare zone: 3

History
- Opened: 21 June 1846

Passengers
- 2024: 36,960,585

Services
| Preceding station | RER | Following station |
|---|---|---|
| Pierrefitte–Stains towards Creil | RER D | Stade de France–Saint-Denis towards Corbeil-Essonnes |
| Pierrefitte–Stains towards Goussainville | RER D | Stade de France–Saint-Denis towards Melun |
| Preceding station | Transilien | Following station |
| Paris-Nord Terminus | Line H | Épinay–Villetaneuse towards Pontoise, Persan–Beaumont or Luzarches |
| Preceding station | Tram | Following station |
| L'Île-Saint-Denis towards Asnières–Quatre Routes | T1 | Théâtre Gérald Philipe towards Noisy-le-Sec |
| Pierre de Geyter towards Saint-Denis–Porte de Paris | T8 | Paul Éluard towards Épinay-Orgemont or Villetaneuse-Université |
Location

Saint-Denis station is a railway station serving Saint-Denis, a northern suburb of Paris in Seine-Saint-Denis department, France. It is on the lines from Paris-Nord to Pontoise, Beauvais and Creil.

The station was the terminus of tramway T1 between 1992 and 2012 when the line was extended to Asnières–Gennevilliers–Les Courtilles. In 2014, a stop on tramway T8 was opened.

== Gallery ==
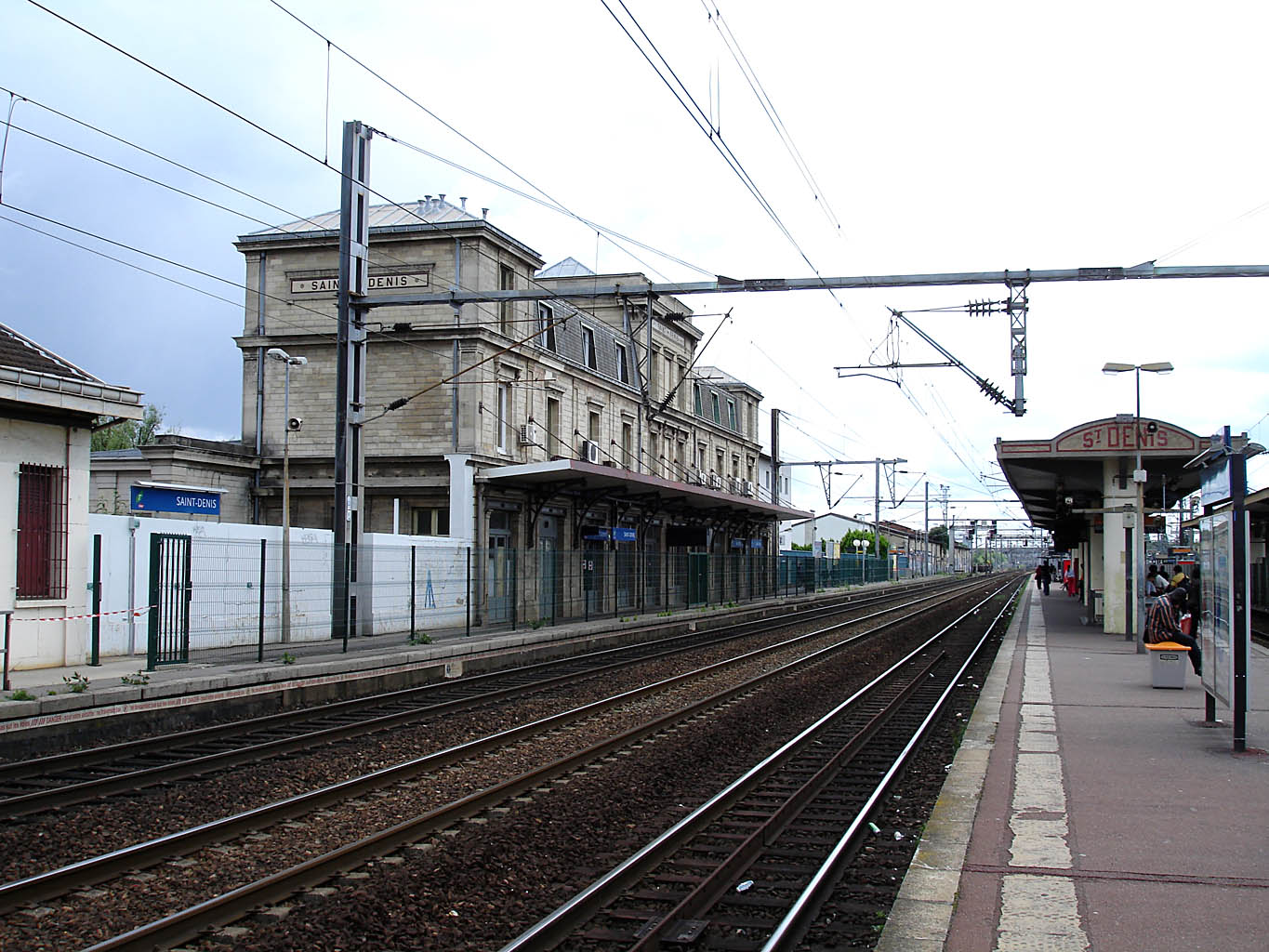
Platforms

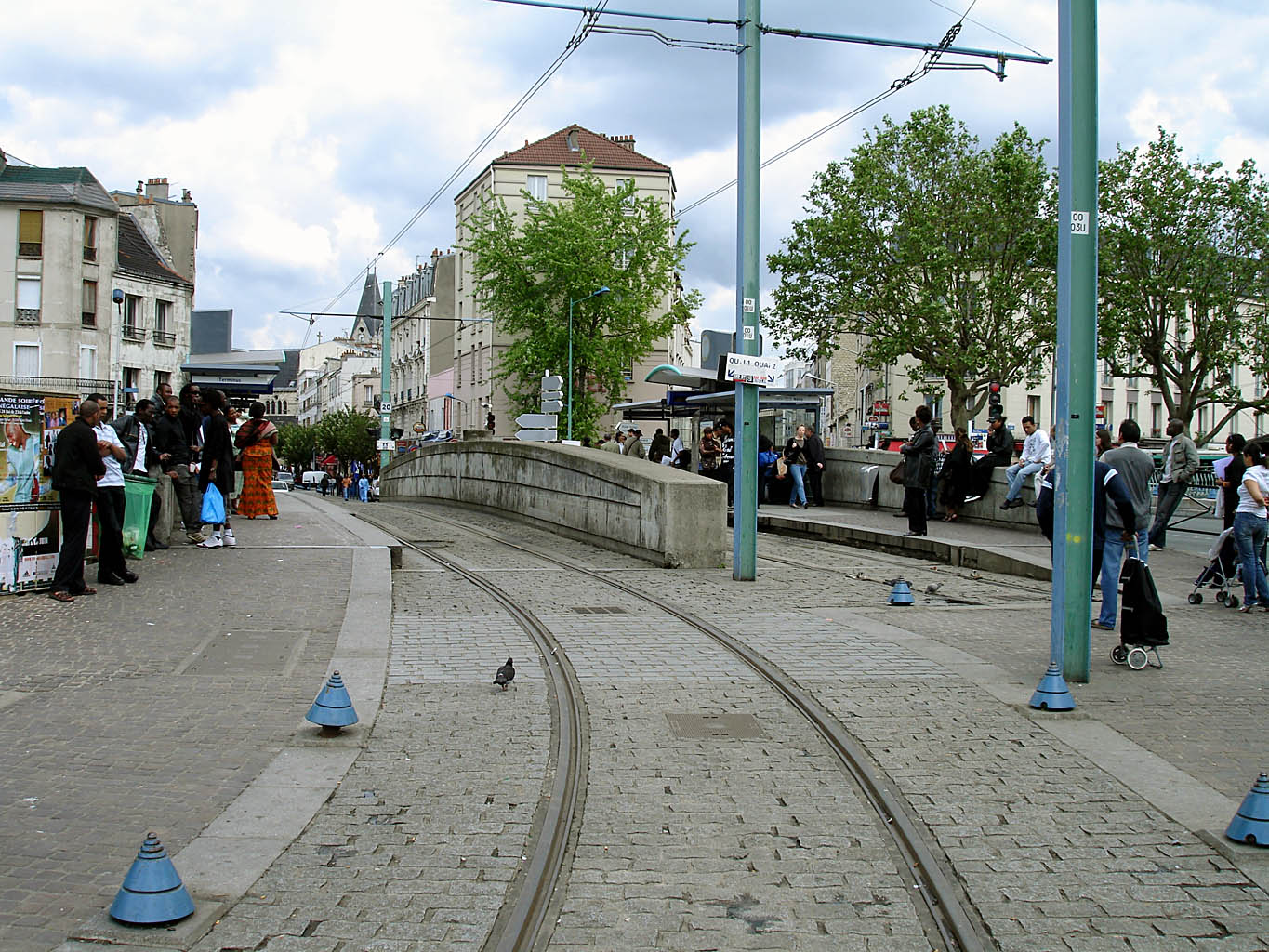
T1 tram stop
