= Red Rock Canyon =

Red Rock Canyon may refer to:

== Parks ==
- Red Rock Canyon National Conservation Area, Clark County, Nevada
- Red Rock Canyon Open Space, Colorado Springs, Colorado
- Red Rock Canyon State Park (California), Kern County, California
- Red Rock Canyon State Park (Oklahoma), Caddo County, Oklahoma

== Canyons ==
- Red Rock Canyon; Waterton Lakes National Park, Alberta
- Red Rock Canyon; Cochise County, Arizona
- Red Rock Canyon; Maricopa County, Arizona
- Red Rock Canyon; Imperial County, California
- Red Rock Canyon; Lassen County, California
- Red Rock Canyon; Los Angeles County, California
- Red Rock Canyon; Mono County, California
- Red Rock Canyon; San Luis Obispo County, California
- Red Rock Canyon; Orange County, California (within Limestone Canyon & Whiting Ranch Wilderness Park)
- Red Rock Canyon; El Paso County, Colorado
- Red Rock Canyon; La Plata County, Colorado
- Red Rock Canyon; Las Animas County, Colorado
- Red Rock Canyon; Moffat County, Colorado
- Red Rock Canyon; Montrose County, Colorado
- Left Fork Red Rock Canyon; Rio Blanco County, Colorado
- Middle Fork Red Rock Canyon; Rio Blanco County, Colorado
- Red Rock Canyon; Rio Blanco County, Colorado
- Red Rock Canyon; Saguache County, Colorado
- Red Rock Canyon; Bear Lake County, Idaho
- Red Rock Canyon; Clark County, Nevada: in Red Rock Canyon National Conservation Area
- Redrock Canyon; Lander County, Nevada
- Red Rock Canyon; Nye County, Nevada
- Red Rock Canyon; Storey County, Nevada
- Red Rock Canyon; Washoe County, Nevada
- Red Rock Canyon; White Pine County, Nevada
- Redrock Canyon; Grant County, New Mexico
- Red Rock Canyon; Jackson County, Oregon
- Red Rock Canyon; Malheur County, Oregon
- Red Rock Canyon; Burnet County, Texas
- Red Rock Canyon; Summit County, Utah

== See also ==
- Red Rock State Park, Sedona, Arizona
