= Saint-Denis–Porte de Paris station =

Metro station in Paris, France

Saint-Denis–Porte de Paris Stade de France
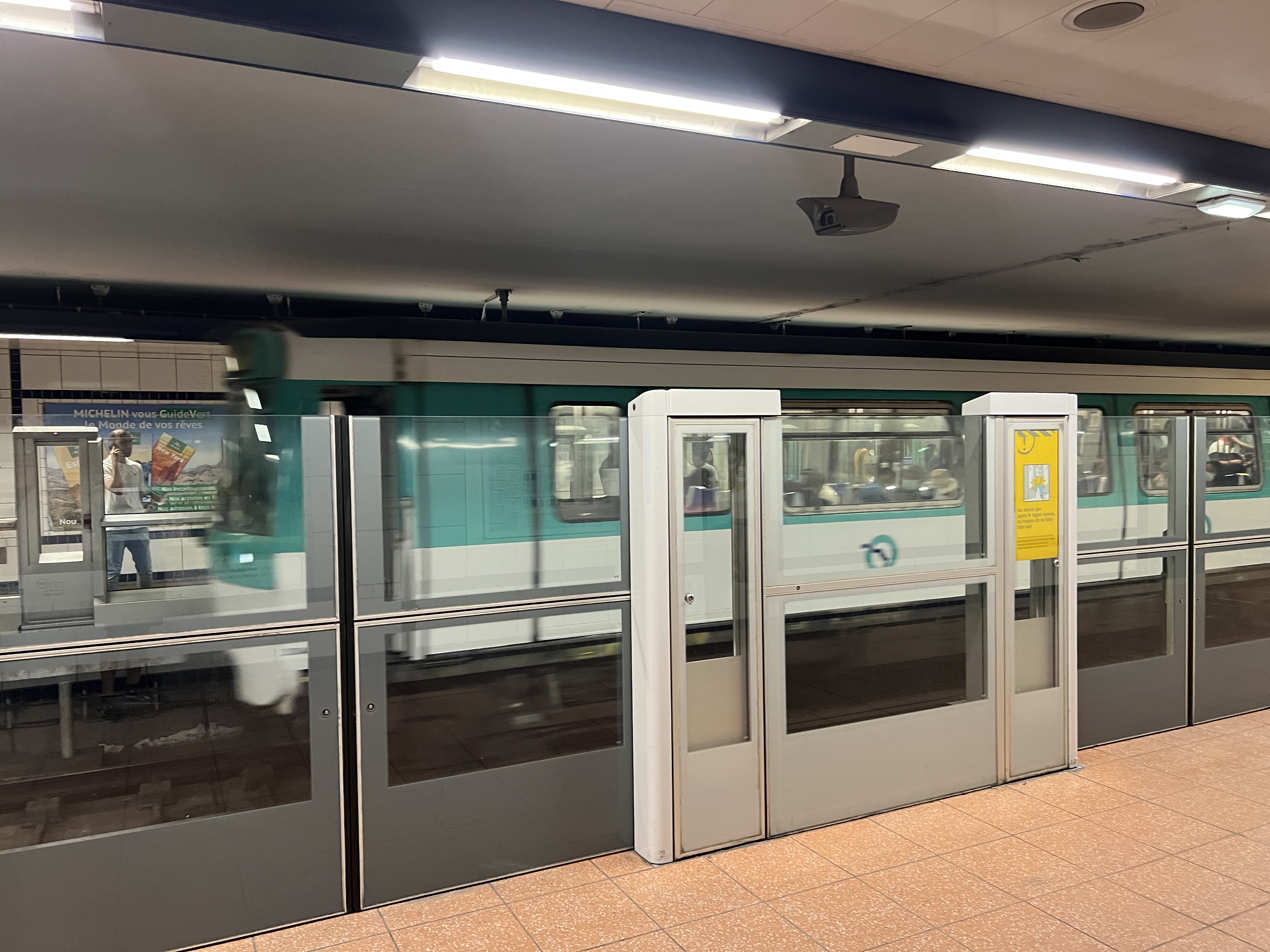
- Station view

General information
- Location: Saint-Denis, Seine-Saint-Denis; Île-de-France; France
- Coordinates: 48°55′49″N 2°21′28″E
- System: Paris Métro station
- Owner: RATP
- Operator: RATP

Construction
- Accessible: yes

Other information
- Fare zone: 1

History
- Opened: 20 June 1976

Services
Preceding station	Paris Metro	Following station
Carrefour Pleyel towards Châtillon–Montrouge	Line 13 Saint-Denis branch	Basilique de Saint-Denis towards Saint-Denis–Université
Preceding station	Tram	Following station
Terminus	T8	Pierre de Geyter towards Épinay-Orgemont or Villetaneuse-Université
Location
- Location within Paris and inner ring

Saint-Denis–Porte de Paris (French pronunciation: [sɛ̃ dəni pɔʁt də paʁi]) is a station on Line 13 of the Paris Métro in the commune of Saint-Denis.

== History ==
The station opened on 26 May 1976 when the line was extended from Carrefour Pleyel to Basilique de Saint-Denis. It was later renovated for the opening of the Stade de France to enable it to handle large flows of passengers. It now has a large hall with many gates to channel large crowds using the station to attend events at the Stade de France.

In October 2008, the decoration of an entire platform of the station with paper billboards, to announce the release of the video game Saints Row 2, sparked a controversy. Residents declared themselves shocked by the violent images (gangs with firearms, etc.) and demanded that the promotional campaign be stopped. The paper billboards were covered with black posters, while the plastic film placed on the walls remained in place until the end of the promotion campaign.

Since the end of 2012, its platforms have been fitted with platform screen doors. In 2014, the station became the southern terminus of Île-de-France tramway Line 8.

In 2020, with the COVID-19 crisis, 2,336,506 travellers entered this station, which places it in the 105th position of metro stations for its use.

== Passenger services ==
=== Access ===
It has a large hall with many passages to channel the large crowds frequenting the station, especially during events at the Stade de France.

It has three entrances:

- Entrance 1: La Plaine - Stade de France (has an elevator for the disabled);
- Entrance 2: Hôpital Casanova (this access, created in 2014, has escalators to facilitate connection with the terminus of line T8);
- Entrance 3: Centre-Ville.

An access passing under Boulevard Marcel-Sembat was filled in during the work to create the T8 line platform.

=== Station layout ===
G	Street Level	Exit/Entrance
B1	Mezzanine	Fare control, connection between platform
B2	Side platform, doors will open on the right
B2	Northbound	← toward Saint-Denis–Université (Basilique de Saint-Denis)
B2	Southbound	toward Châtillon–Montrouge (Carrefour Pleyel) →
B2	Side platform, doors will open on the right

=== Platforms ===
The standard configuration station with two platforms separated by metro tracks has a flat ceiling supported by joists. The walls are vertical, adorned with square white tiles on which advertising panels are placed for sponsorship operations by Métrobus, especially during major sports tournaments at the Stade de France.

=== Other connections ===
Since 16 December 2014, the metro station has been the southern terminus of Île-de-France tramway Line 8, the other terminuses of which are, on its northern branch, the Gare de Villetaneuse-Université - which offers a connection with the T11 Express tram line - and, on its western branch, the Épinay-Orgemont tram station.

The station is also served by lines 153, 170, 239, 253, 255 and 353 of the RATP Bus Network and, at night, by lines N44 and N143 of the Noctilien network.

== Nearby ==
The station serves the northern district of the La Plaine Saint-Denis and south of downtown Saint-Denis. It is the closest metro station to the Stade de France and the Musée d'art et d'histoire de Saint-Denis. The nearby Labor Exchange hosts many public meetings or congresses of non-governmental organizations (NGOs), trade unions or political parties.

The Centre Hospitalier de Saint-Denis (hospital) is located in the immediate vicinity, and the station serves the northern part of the tertiary district of La Plaine Saint-Denis (Engie research center, headquarters of the Établissement public territorial Plaine Commune).

== Gallery ==
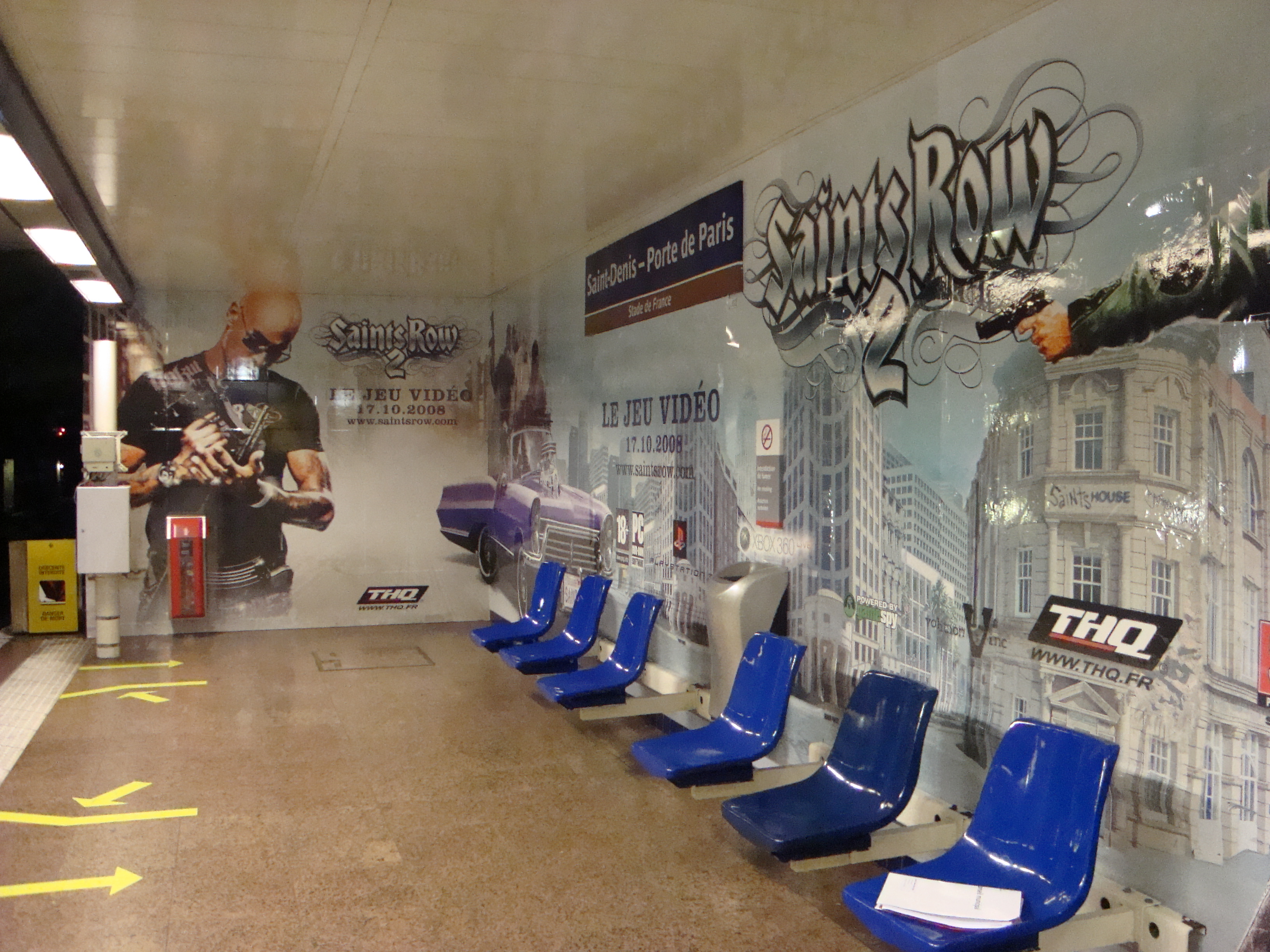
Line 13 platforms in the colours of Saints Row 2

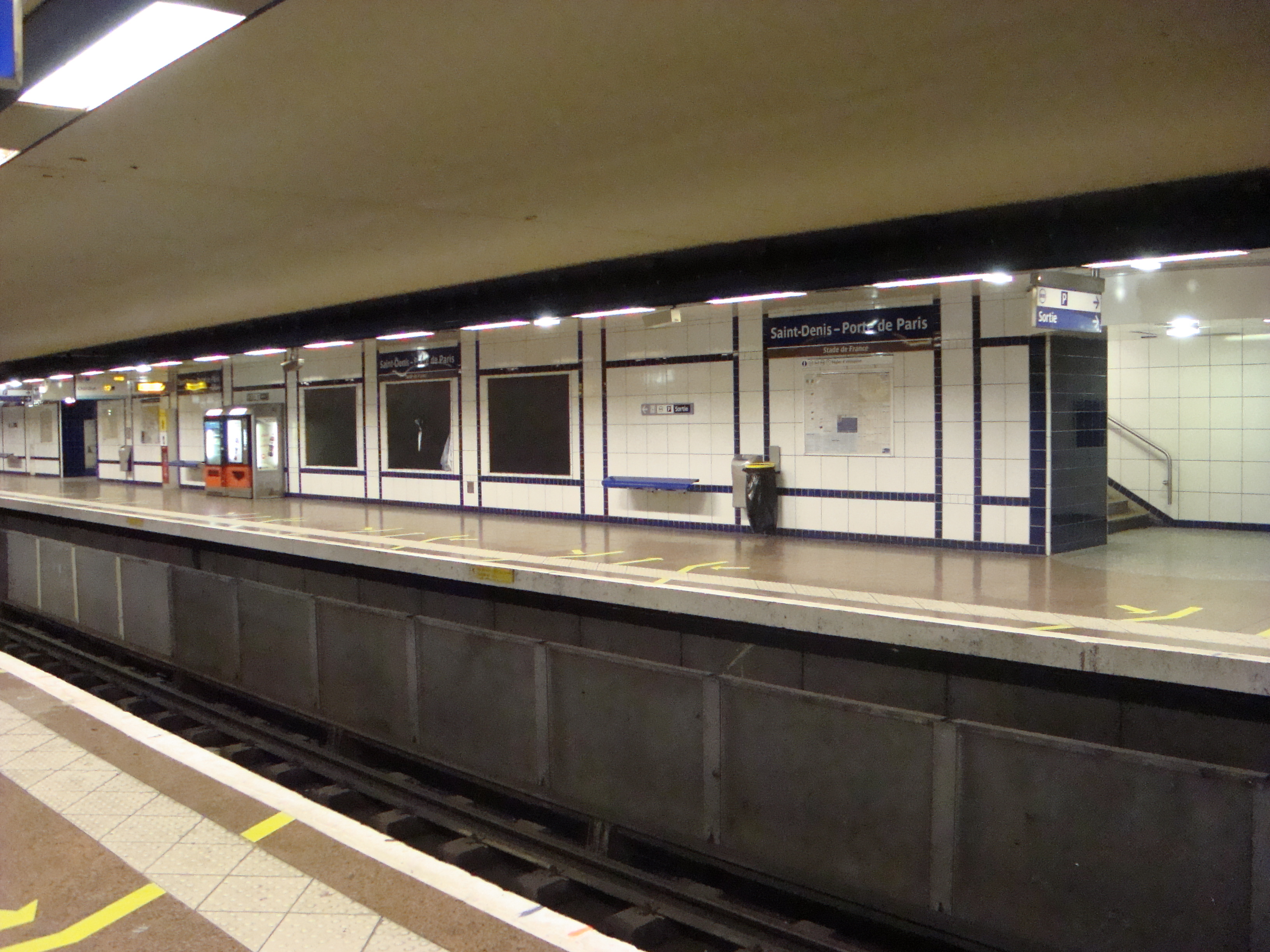
The Saints Row 2 advertisements covered in black after complaints about the depiction of violence

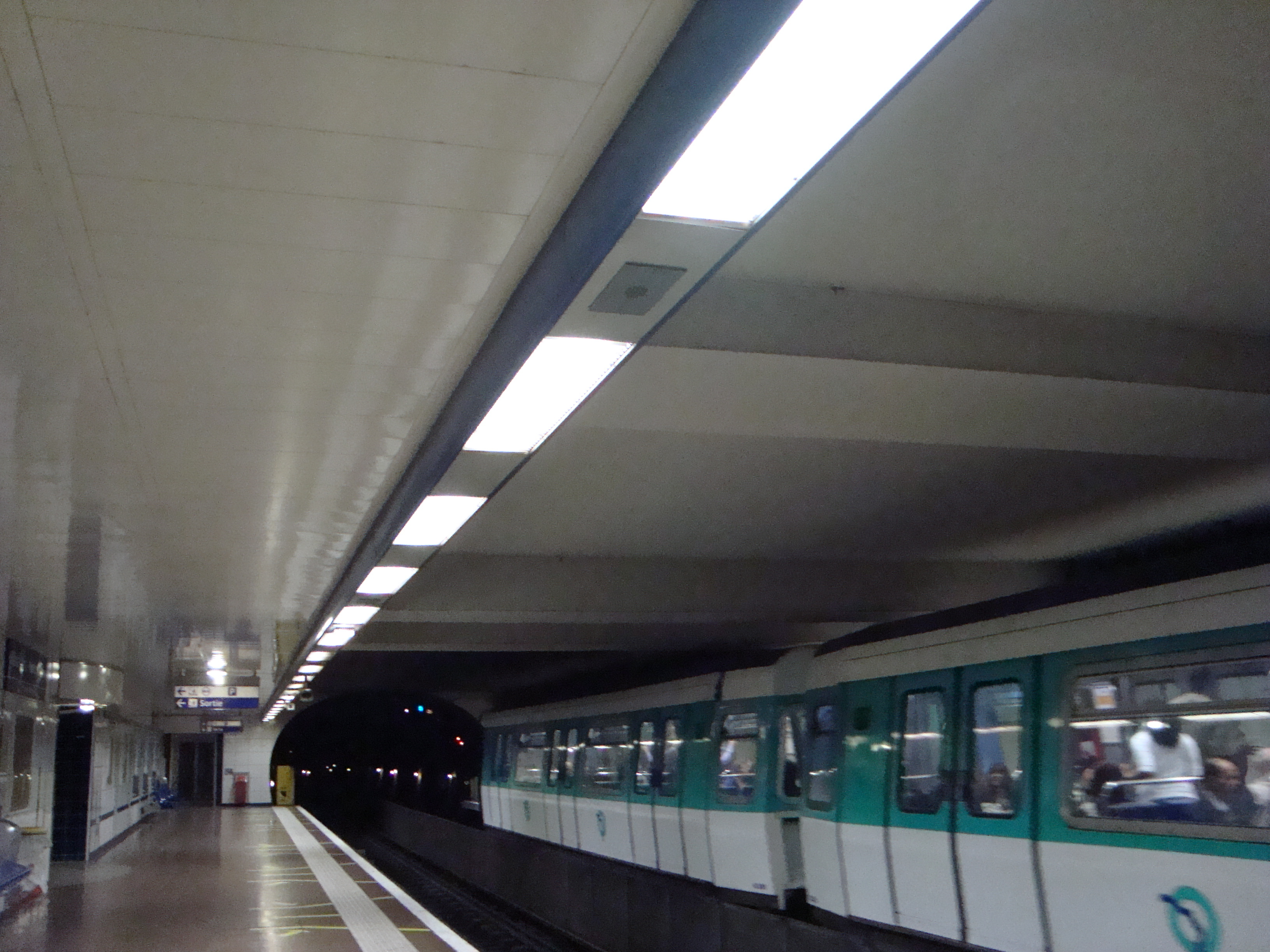
MF 77 rolling stock on Line 13 at the station
