= La Fourche station =

Metro station in Paris, France

La Fourche
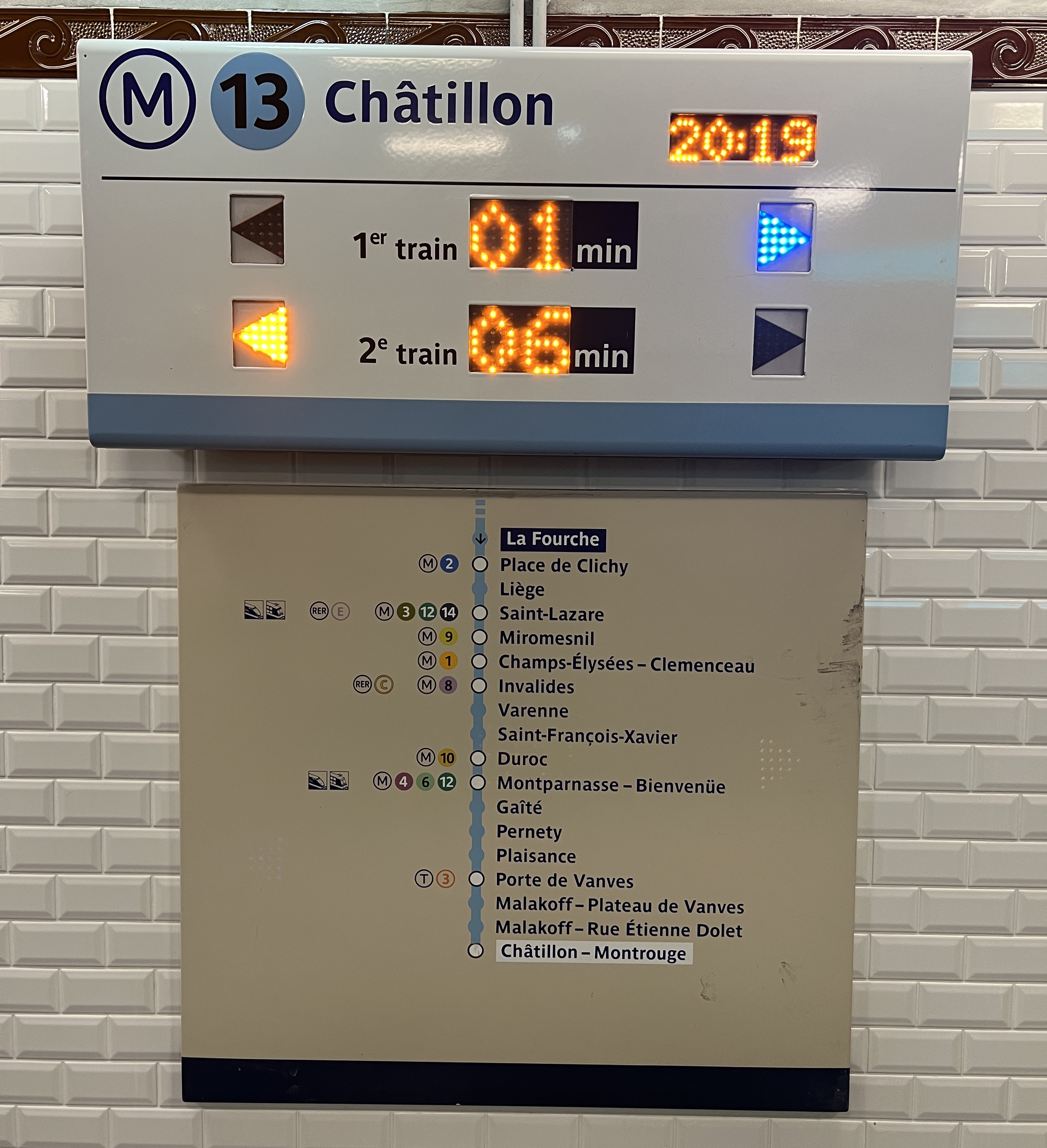
- A special usage of SIEL at La Fourche, Line 13

General information
- Location: 17th/18th arrondissement of Paris; Île-de-France; France
- Coordinates: 48°53′13″N 2°19′33″E
- System: Paris Métro station
- Owner: RATP Group
- Operator: RATP Group
- Line: Line 13
- Platforms: 3
- Tracks: 3

Other information
- Station code: 31-14
- Fare zone: 1

History
- Opened: 26 February 1911

Other services
Preceding station	Paris Metro	Following station
Place de Clichy towards Châtillon–Montrouge	Line 13 Les Courtilles branch	Brochant towards Les Courtilles
Place de Clichy towards Châtillon–Montrouge	Line 13 Saint-Denis branch	Guy Môquet towards Saint-Denis–Université
Location
- Location within Paris

La Fourche (French pronunciation: [la fuʁʃ]) is a station of the Paris Métro, serving Line 13.

== Location ==
The station is at the heart of a junction in two branches of line 13: the Asnières - Gennevilliers branch and the Saint-Denis branch. The first remains in a two-lane tunnel from the common trunk. On the other hand, the second is doubled: towards Saint-Denis, it leaves the double track just after the La Fourche station and finds the opposite way coming from Saint-Denis before the Guy Môquet station; in the other direction, towards Châtillon, the track coming from Saint-Denis separates before La Fourche and passes under the double-track tunnel of the Asnières branch to serve a platform in a station located below and consisting of a single platform of this unique path; then it joins the double-track tunnel just before Place de Clichy station.

== History ==
The station opened on 26 February 1911 as part of the Nord-Sud Company's line B from Saint-Lazare to Porte de Saint-Ouen. On 20 January 1912 it became a junction with the opening of the northwesterly branch to Porte de Clichy. On 27 March 1931 line B became line 13 of the Métro.

Its name refers to the place called "La Fourche" which, on the surface, designates the Y-shaped crossroads of Avenue de Saint-Ouen and Avenue de Clichy. At this point, the two branches of line 13 separate.

From its conception, the station was decorated in the very elaborate style of the Nord-Sud Company. From the 1950s until 2010, the upper station had a metallic bodywork with blue horizontal pillars, illuminated gold advertising frames complemented by blue colored Motte seats. The lower and upper stations were renovated in 2010, restoring, for the latter, the original North-South style.

In 2019, 2,563,103 passengers entered this station which places it in 204th position among metro stations for its attendance out of 302.

== Passenger services ==
=== Access ===
The station has only one entrance located on the sidewalk at the corner of Avenue de Clichy and Avenue de Saint-Ouen. A SIEL sign located at the ticket hall indicates to travelers the waiting times allowing them to choose between the two platforms in the direction of Châtillon.

In April 2025, construction work aimed at restoring the station entrance's original appearance started, and was completed in March 2026. In 1964, the original iron railing had been damaged by a bus crashing into it, and was replaced by a concrete wall that was thought to be temporary but ended up remaining in place for over 60 years.

=== Station layout ===
G	Street Level	Exit/Entrance
B1	Mezzanine	Fare control, connection between platform
B2	Side platform, doors will open on the right
B2	Northbound	← toward Les Courtilles (Brochant) ← toward Saint-Denis - Université (Guy Môquet)
B2	Southbound	toward Châtillon - Montrouge (Place de Clichy) →
B2	Side platform, doors will open on the right
B3	Southbound	toward Châtillon - Montrouge (Place de Clichy) →
B3	Side platform, doors will open on the right

=== Platforms ===
La Fourche has the particularity of having two stations located one above the other: the first is called the upper station; the second is called the lower station.

The upper station has a platform in the direction of Asnières and Saint-Denis and a platform in the direction of Châtillon-Montrouge served only by trains from Asnières. It is of standard configuration with two platforms separated by the metro tracks. The walls are vertical, and the vault is semi-elliptical, characteristic of North-South stations. The tiles and ceramics, completely redone in 2010, takes up the original decoration with advertising frames and the surrounds of the name of the station in brown color, brown geometric designs on the walls and the vault, the name inscribed in white earthenware on a blue background of a small size above the advertising frames and of a very large size between these frames, as well as the directions incorporated in the ceramic on the tunnel exits. The bevelled white earthenware tiles cover the walls, the vault and the tunnel exits. The lighting is provided by two canopies and the seats, Akiko style, are yellow.

The lower station has a single platform towards Châtillon-Montrouge served only by trains from Saint-Denis. Renovated 2010 at the same time as the upper station, although never having been fitted with a bodywork, it uses the same advertising frames, the same surrounds for the name of the station, the same lighting and the same seats. Being located under the upper station, it has a concrete ceiling, undecorated, supported by vertical walls, unique for a North-South station. It also has on the wall, in front of the platform, several paintings referring to North-South society.

North of La Fourche station and heading south from Guy Môquet, the tracks on the Saint-Denis branch diverge, the northbound track ascending and joining with the tracks from Asnières - Gennevilliers just before reaching the station. The southbound track remains at the same level and enters the station underneath the rest of the tracks. Heading south from the station, the tracks from the upper-level platforms descend and the southbound track from the lower-level platform joins them just north of the Place de Clichy.

=== Bus connections ===
The station is served by lines 21, 54 and 74 and, at night, by lines N15 and N51 of the Noctilien network.

== Gallery ==
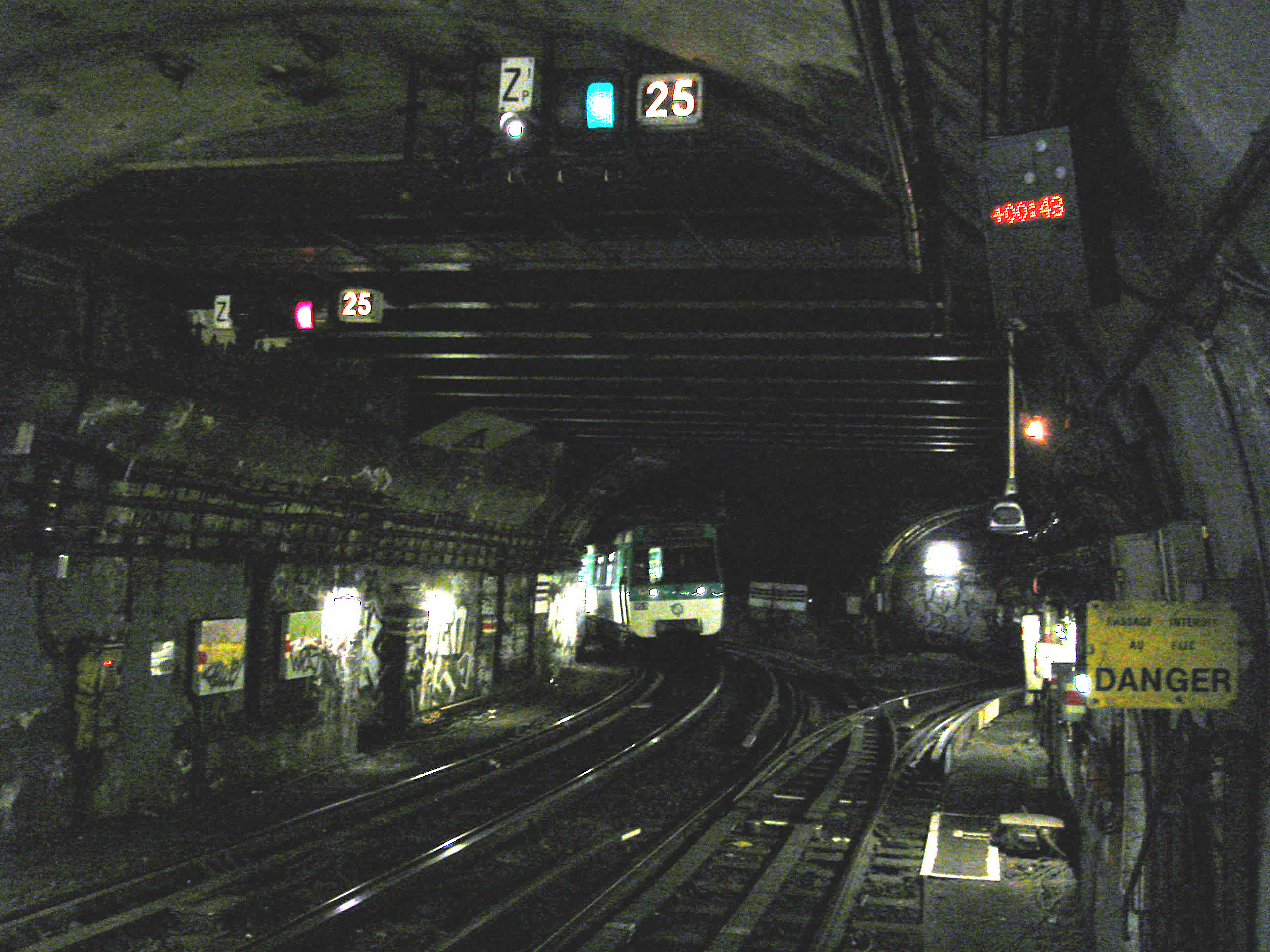
Separation of the tracks north of the station.

MF 77 rolling stock on Line 13 at La Fourche.

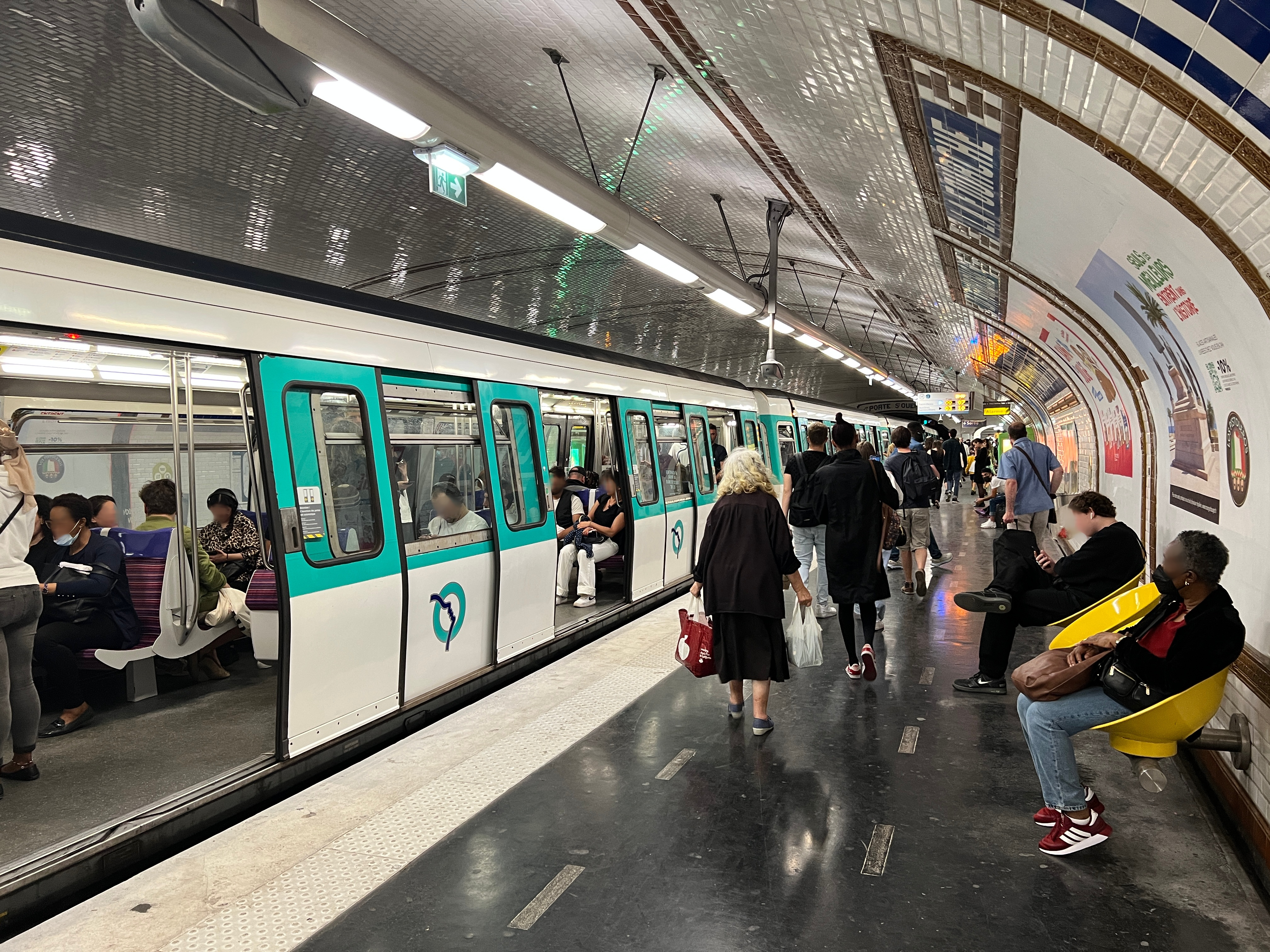
MF 77 rolling stock at La Fourche in 2022.

== See also ==
- List of stations of the Paris Métro
