= Auguste Balagny =

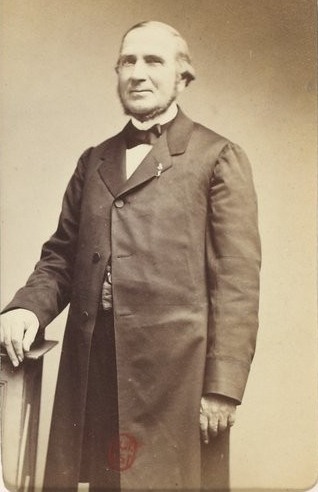

Mayor of the 17th arrondissement of Paris
- In office 1843–1848

Personal details
- Born: June 18, 1805 Coulombs, France
- Died: March 20, 1896 (aged 90) Paris, France
- Occupation: notary

Auguste Prosper Balagny (June 18, 1805 in Coulombs, France – March 20, 1896 in Paris) was a French notary and the first mayor of the 17th arrondissement of Paris.

== Biography ==
Auguste was the son of Jacques Balagny and Marie-Jeanne Dupuis. His father was a farmer and miller at the Rutz mill on the east bank of the river Eure near Coulombs, across from Nogent-le-Roi, and served as mayor of Coulombs for 35 years, from 1807 until his death in 1842.

Auguste was the fifth of seven children. While his siblings plied their father's trade in agriculture, Auguste obtained an appointment as a notary in Paris in 1832, practicing at 3 Rue d’Antin (currently Rue Biot). His assistant, Baron, replaced him there on August 5, 1854. He was then living at 11 Rue des Dames, at the end of the Rue d’Antin.

In 1830, after two and a half years of negotiations, the villages of Batignolles and Monceaux detached themselves from the commune of Clichy and formed an independent commune called Batignolles-Monceaux. According to a contemporary newspaper, Le Moniteur Universel, "The population was made up of well-to-do people, drawn by the wholesome air and the pleasant location."

Balagny was elected mayor of Batignolles-Monceaux by royal decree on January 16, 1843. He brought a large number of entrepreneurs and important businesses into the new commune. During the French Revolution of 1848, his vigorous efforts preserved the area from disturbance at the hands of the rioters. He even opposed the construction of barricades. "Balagny, mayor, and Brand, second deputy mayor, did everything humanly possible to prevent the spilling of blood."

In order to repay him for his service, Prefect Haussmann decorated him with the Knight's Cross of the Legion of Honor and named one of the neighborhood's most beautiful streets after him.

The Revolution of 1848 frightened the bourgeois Parisians, causing many to withdraw to the commune and boosting the population to 30,000.

In 1842, the population of Batignolles-Monceaux, having reached 14,073 inhabitants, M. Balagny thought it appropriate to build a new city hall, replacing the old one situated in a small house in the courtyard at number 50 Rue Truffaut. The architect, Eugène Lequeux, who had already built the Church of Saint Mary of Batignolles and the Théâtre des Arts—now the Théâtre Hébertot—was charged with its construction. The first stone was set in place on September 19, 1847, and the building was opened on October 21, 1949, by Prince Napoleon, son of King Jérôme, then colonel of the Second Legion of the National Guard of the Banlieue. This city hall, which in 1860 became that of the 17th Arrondissement, was rightly considered one of the most beautiful in Paris and in its neighborhood.

The city hall was expanded several times to relieve crowded conditions. Its belltower, mounted with a four-faced clock, was especially admired. The tower was demolished in 1952 rather than repaired.

Balagny, having lost his mayor's sash in 1848 with the fall of Louis Philippe I, was triumphantly reelected in 1850 and stayed in office until 1870. He was also a council member of the Arrondissement of Saint-Denis.

Nicknamed "the Haussmann of Batignolles," he oversaw the transition of the commune from countryside to city; most of the streets were planned and paved at his direction, and he had the Théâtre des Batignolles renamed the Théâtre des Arts (currently the Théâtre Hébertot). In 1855, the Batignollaises, a local horse-drawn omnibus company, was merged with several other Parisian transportation businesses to form the General Omnibus Company (Compagnie générale des omnibus).

Balagny's deputy was Jean-Félix Salneuve, professor of topography and geodesy at the École d'application du Corps royal d'état-major. More progressive in his political opinions, he was often at odds with his superior. Balagny retaliated for the opposition by obtaining from Prefect Haussmann a decree authorising the enlargement of the street where Salneuve lived. The construction set Salneuve's house out of alignment, as it remains today. However, the two men reconciled and the mayor's son, Georges Balagny, married the deputy's cousin, Berthe Salneuve.

Auguste Balagny bought the Château du Buat at Maule, where he would serve as mayor from 1880 to 1888.

He was married at a civil ceremony in Paris on April 21, 1836, and at a religious service in the Church of Notre-Dame-de-Lorette to Adélaïde Léopoldine Genet, a merchant's daughter. She gave birth to two children: Georges Balagny, photographer, married to Berthe Salneuve; and Léopoldine Balagny, married to Charles Duchanoy, graduate of the École Polytechnique, mining engineer, and son of Louis Duchanoy.

Auguste died in his home at 10 Boulevard des Batignolles, Paris, on March 28, 1896. He was buried at the Montmartre Cemetery in the tomb of his wife's parents, on which his name is still engraved. Two months later, he was transferred to the family vault at the Batignolles Cemetery.

== Legacy ==
A station of the Paris Métro Line 13 bore the name Marcadet-Balagny from 1912 to 1946, before it was changed to Guy Môquet. The Rue Balagny, a street in Paris, was also named after him until it was rechristened the Rue Guy-Môquet in 1945. The Rue Neuve-Balagny, which adjoins the preceding street, was renamed the Rue Lacaille in 1881.

The Square Auguste-Balagny, a park located near the Porte de Champerret metro station, has kept its name since 1987.

== Bibliography ==
=== By Auguste Balagny ===
- Discours prononcé par M. Balagny, maire de Batignolles-Monceaux, à l'occasion de l'installation du nouveau conseil municipal, le 28 novembre 1855. Batignolles: Impr. de Hennuyer, 1855.
- M. Balagny, maire du 17^{e} arrondissement (Batignolles), Candidat conservateur libéral à MM. les électeurs de la 1^{e} Circonscription électorale de la Seine. Paris: Impr. Dupont, 1869.

=== About Auguste Balagny ===
- Puteaux, Lucien. Discours prononcé le 30 mars 1896 sur la tombe de M. Auguste Balagny, ancien notaire, ancien maire du 17e arrondissement, chevalier de la Légion d'honneur, par M. Lucien Puteaux. Paris: Impr. de Hennuyer, 1896.
