= Mairie de Saint-Ouen station =

Metro station in Saint-Ouen, France

Mairie de Saint-Ouen Région Île-de-France
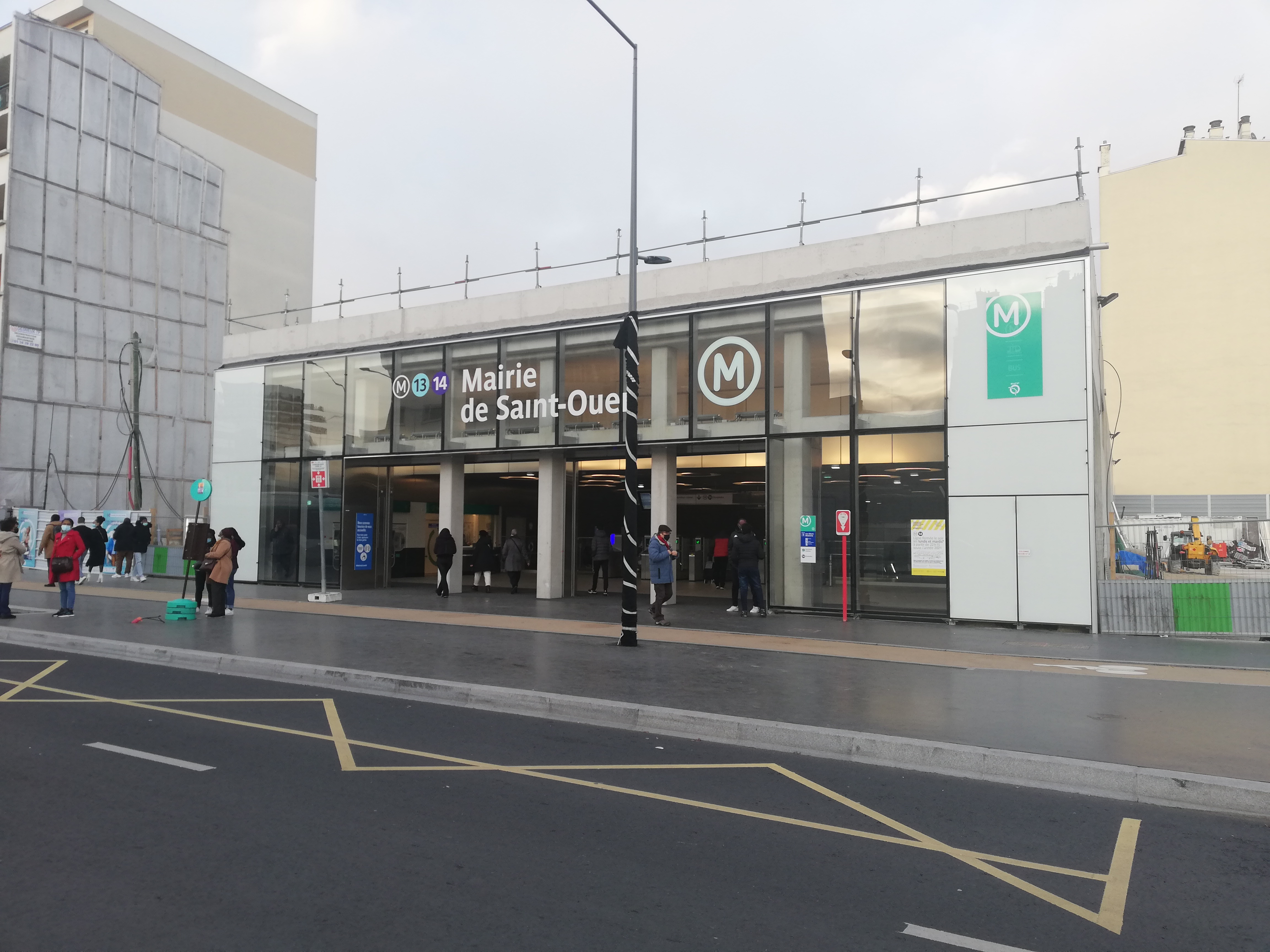
- Mairie de Saint-Ouen station entrance, opened alongside the extension of Line 14 in December 2020.

General information
- Location: Saint-Ouen, Seine-Saint-Denis; Île-de-France; France
- Coordinates: 48°54′42″N 2°20′02″E
- Operated by: RATP Group

Construction
- Accessible: Yes

Other information
- Fare zone: 2

History
- Opened: 30 June 1952
- Rebuilt: 2020

Services
| Preceding station | Paris Metro | Following station |
|---|---|---|
| Garibaldi towards Châtillon–Montrouge | Line 13 Saint-Denis branch | Carrefour Pleyel towards Saint-Denis–Université |
| Saint-Denis–Pleyel Terminus | Line 14 | Saint-Ouen towards Aéroport d'Orly |
Location

Mairie de Saint-Ouen station (French pronunciation: [mɛʁi d(ə) sɛ̃t‿wɛ̃]) is a station on lines 13 and 14 of the Paris Métro in the commune of Saint-Ouen. It is named after the nearby town hall of Saint-Ouen.

== Location ==
Line 13 station is located under Place de la République, at the intersection of Avenue Gabriel-Péri, Boulevard Victor-Hugo and Boulevard Jean-Jaurès. That of Line 14 is located slightly further north, at the intersection of Boulevard Jean-Jaurès, Rue du Docteur-Bauer and Rue Albert-Dhalenne. The Line 13 tunnel is located parallel to and above that of Line 14. A short connecting corridor connects the latter's station to the platform of Line 13 in the direction of Châtillon.

== History ==
The station opened on 30 June 1952 when line 13 was extended from Porte de Saint-Ouen to Carrefour Pleyel. In 2019, according to RATP estimates, the station's annual use was 4,314,548, which places it in 107th position among metro stations for its use.

=== Extensions of Line 14 ===
On 14 December 2020, Line 14 was extended by 5.9 km from Saint-Lazare to the station. The construction of the Mairie de Saint-Ouen station was built by the Bouygues TP, Solétanche Bachy France, Solétanche Bachy tunnel and CSM Bessac consortium. Structural work began in April 2015.

On the occasion of the opening of the platforms for Line 14, the station name bears the caption Région Île-de-France, the headquarters of the Regional Council of Île-de-France located about 200 meters to the west at 2 Rue Simone-Veil, in the Docks de Saint-Ouen eco-district. It's the first connection between two Paris metro lines outside the capital. In 2023, a permanent artwork by South Korean conceptual artist Kimsooja was unveiled, consisting of glass walls that diffract light.

In 2024, Line 14 was extended north to Saint-Denis–Pleyel.

== Passenger services ==
=== Access ===
The station has five entrances:

- Entrance 1: Avenue Gabriel-Peri;
- Entrance 2: Boulevard Victor-Hugo;
- Entrance 3: Boulevard Jean-Jaurès;
- Entrance 4: Esplanade Jean Moulin;
- Entrance 5: Rue Albert Dhalenne.

The first three entrances are located in the Place de la République, and converge on a ticket room. They are complemented by an escalator that leads directly to the road, from the platform in the direction of Saint-Denis.

When Line 14 was put into service, two other entrances were installed on Boulevard Jean-Jaurès on either side of Rue Albert-Dhalenne. These two entrances are located on the ground floor of buildings that will be erected later above entrances.

=== Station layout ===
| G | Street Level | Exit/Entrance |
| B1 | Mezzanine | Fare control, connection between platforms |
| B2 | Side platform, doors will open on the right |
| B2 | Southbound | ← toward Châtillon–Montrouge (Garibaldi) |
| B2 | Northbound | toward Saint-Denis-Université (Carrefour Pleyel) → |
| B2 | Side platform, doors will open on the right |
| B3 | Side platform with PSDs, doors will open on the right |
| B3 | Northbound | ← toward Saint-Denis–Pleyel (Terminus) |
| B3 | Southbound | toward Aéroport d'Orly (Saint-Ouen) → |
| B3 | Side platform with PSDs, doors will open on the right |

=== Platforms ===
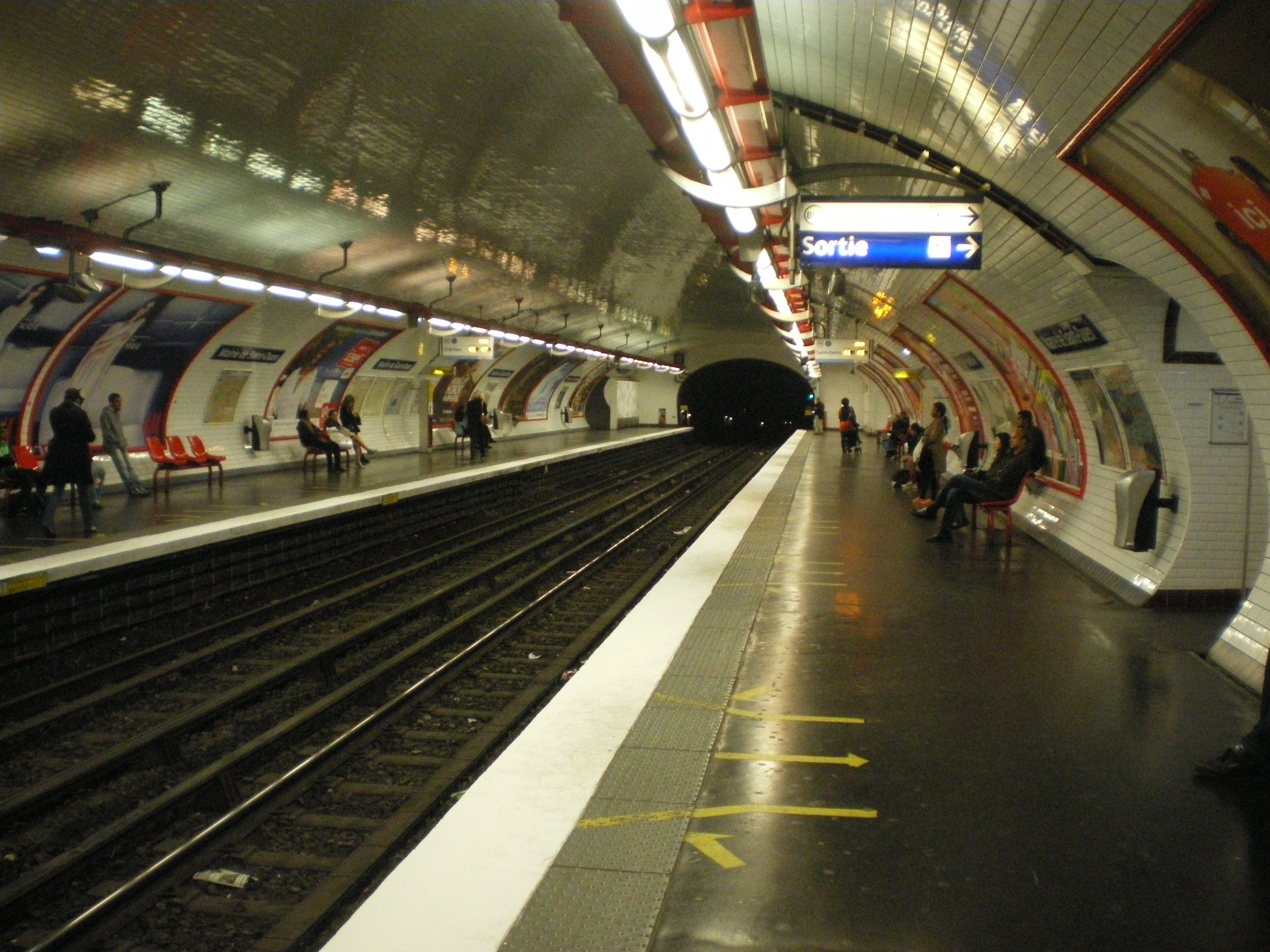
Line 13 platforms

Line 13 station has a standard configuration. It has two platforms separated by the metro tracks and the arch is elliptical. The decoration is in the Ouï-dire style in red. The lighting canopy, is in the same colour, supported by curved brackets in the shape of a scythe. The direct lighting is white while the indirect lighting, projected on the vault, is multi-coloured. The white ceramic tiles are flat and cover the walls, the vault and the tunnel exits. The advertising frames are red and cylindrical and the name of the station is written in the Parisine font on enamel plates. The platforms are equipped with red Motte style seats.

The line 14 station has platform screen doors. The floor and walls are covered with bevelled white tiles.

=== Bus connections ===
The station is served by lines 85, 137, 140, 166, 173, 237, 274 and the L'Audonienne urban service of the RATP Bus Network and, at night, by lines N14 and N44 of the Noctilien network.

== Nearby ==
- Mairie de Saint-Ouen-sur-Seine
- Alstom Transport, siège social
- Hôtel des impôts de Saint-Ouen-sur-Seine
- Conseil régional d'Île-de-France
- Grand Parc des Docks de Saint-Ouen
