= Balagny =

Balagny may refer to:

== Places ==
- Balagny-sur-Thérain, a commune in the Oise department in northern France
- Balagny-Saint-Épin station, a railway station in Balagny-sur-Thérain

== People ==
- Auguste Balagny (1805-1896), first mayor of the 17th arrondissement of Paris
- Georges Balagny (1837-1919), French photographer
