= Guy Môquet station =

Metro station in Paris, France

Guy Môquet
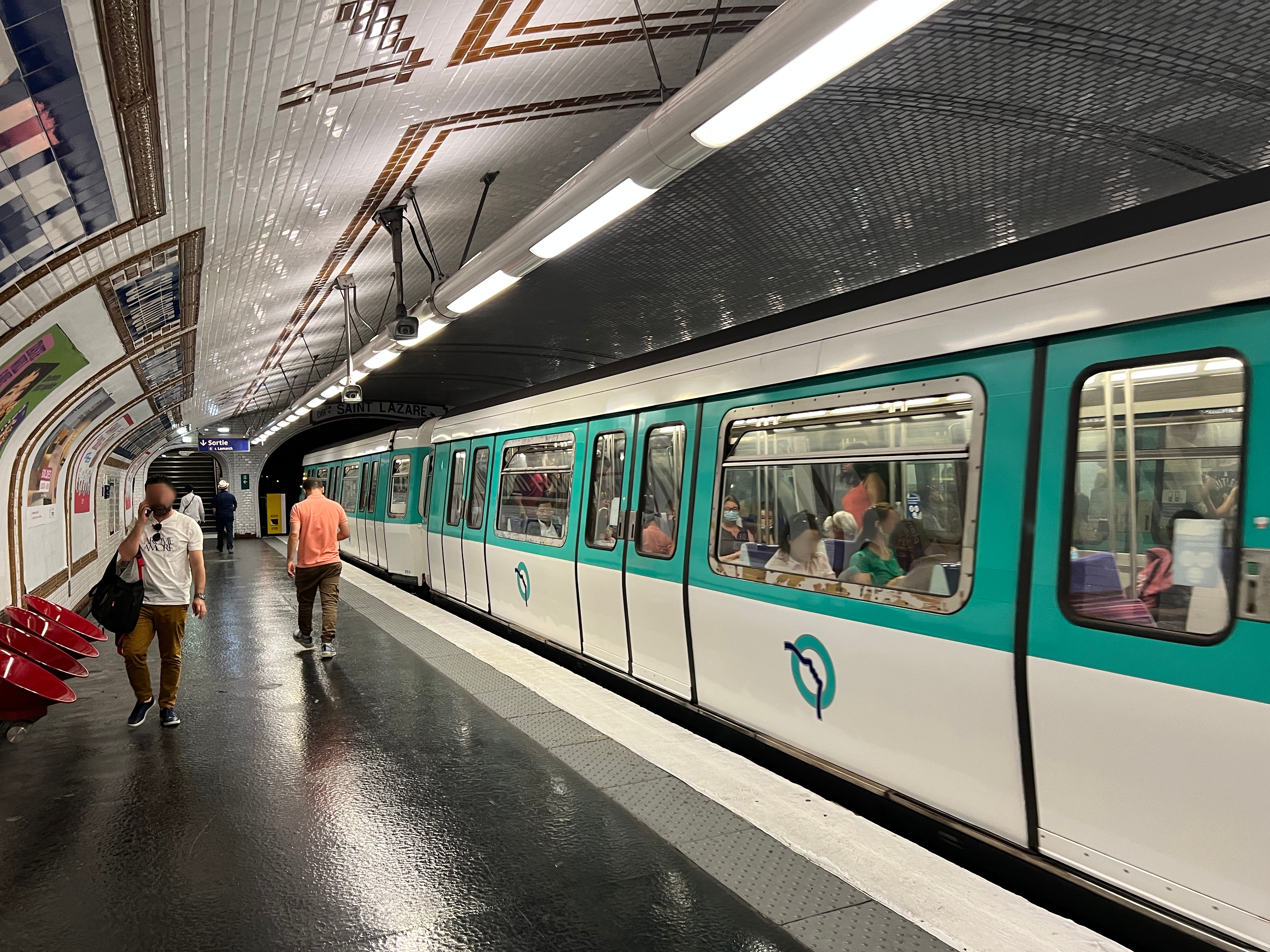
- Platforms

General information
- Location: 17th arrondissement of Paris; Île-de-France; France
- Coordinates: 48°53′32″N 2°19′38″E
- System: Paris Métro station
- Owner: RATP
- Operator: RATP

Other information
- Fare zone: 1

History
- Opened: 26 February 1911
- Former names: Carrefour Marcadet (1911–1912); Marcadet – Balagny (1912–1946)

Services
Preceding station	Paris Metro	Following station
La Fourche towards Châtillon–Montrouge	Line 13 Saint-Denis branch	Porte de Saint-Ouen towards Saint-Denis–Université
Location
- Location within Paris

Guy Môquet (French pronunciation: [ɡi mokɛ]) is a station on Line 13 of the Paris Métro. It is located on the border between the 17th arrondissement and 18th arrondissement, on the line's northeastern branch.

It opened in 1911 as Carrefour Marcadet, renamed in 1912 to Marcadet – Balagny. It took its present name in 1946, in hommage to the teenage resistant Guy Môquet.

== Location ==
The station is located under Avenue de Saint-Ouen, to the south of the intersection of Rue Guy-Môquet, Rue Championnet, Marcadet, Legendre and Rue de la Jonquière. Oriented approximately along a north-south axis and located on the branch towards Saint-Denis–Université, it is located between the Porte de Saint-Ouen and La Fourche metro stations, the latter marking the beginning of the common branch line of line 13 towards Châtillon - Montrouge metro station.

== History ==
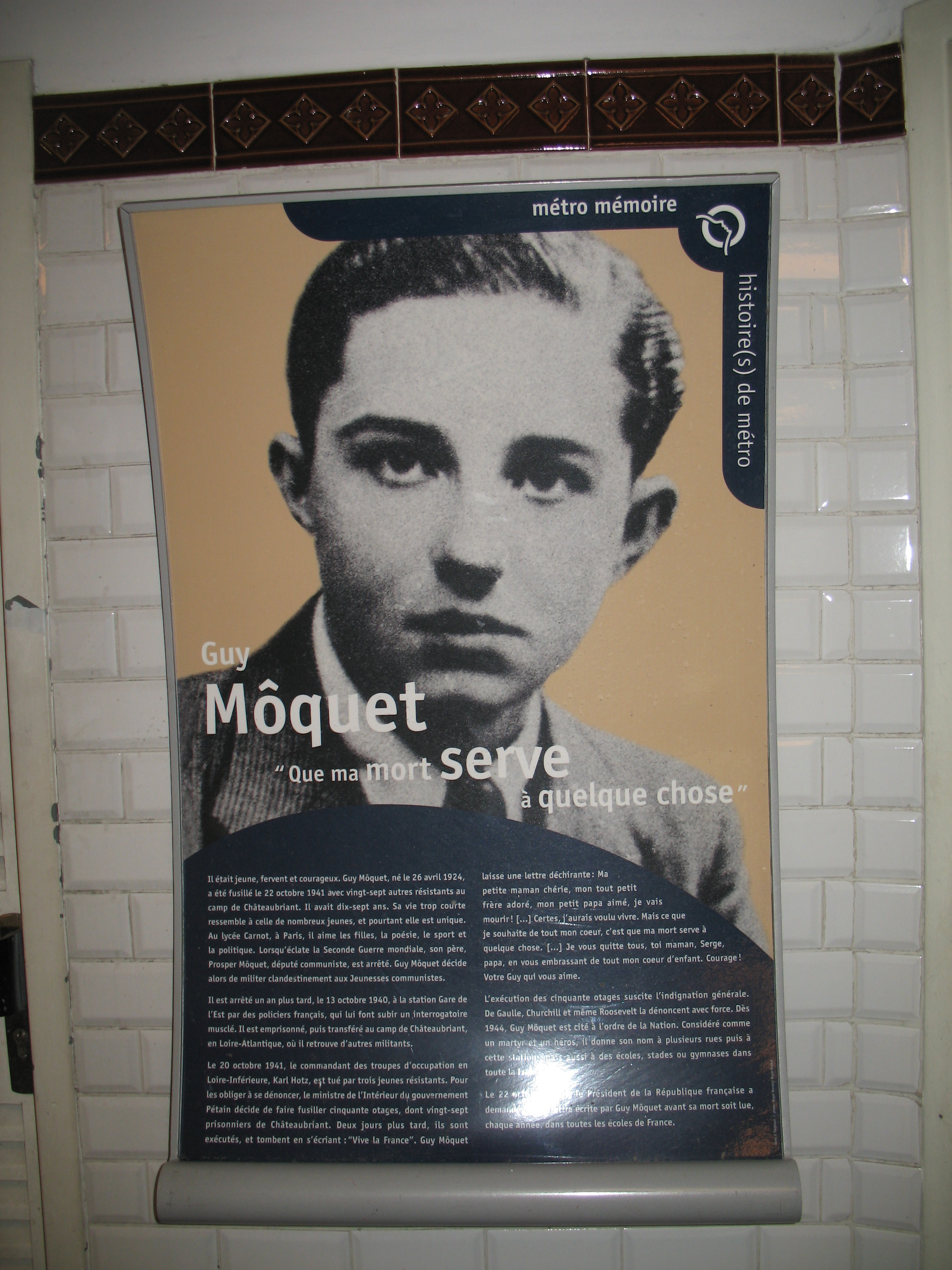
Guy Môquet remembered at the station

The station opened on 26 February 1911 as part of Line B of the Nord-Sud Company, from Saint-Lazare to Porte de Saint-Ouen. Its original name, Carrefour Marcadet (in reference to Rue Marcadet), was changed the year after the opening to Marcadet – Balagny, after Rue Balagny, itself named after Auguste Balagny, who served as the first mayor of the 17th arrondissement of Paris from 1860 until 1870.

On 27 March 1931, line B became line 13 following the absorption of the Société du Nord-Sud on 1 January 1930 by its competitor, the Compagnie du chemin de fer métropolitain de Paris (known as the CMP).

On 27 January 1946, the station was renamed a second time to become Guy Môquet, and at the same time as Rue Balagny, renamed Rue Guy-Môquet in homage to a young French communist activist, shot by the Nazis at the age of seventeen. The station is thus one of the eight in the network to have seen its surname evolve at the end of the World War Two in order to honor the memory of resistance fighters who died for France, with Trinité - d'Estienne d'Orves (line 12), Charles Michels (line 10), Colonel Fabien (line 2), Corentin Celton (line 12), Jacques Bonsergent (line 5), Corentin Cariou (line 7) and Marx Dormoy (line 12).

From the 1950s until 2008, the wall were covered with a metallic panels with blue horizontal uprights and illuminated golden advertising frames. This arrangement was supplemented by benches, which were subsequently removed in favor of shell seats characteristic of the Motte style, in white.

As part of the RATP Renouveau du métro program, the station corridors were renovated on 16 May 2003, then it was the turn of the platforms in 2009, resulting in the removal of their metal panels in favor of a return of the original Nord-Sud decoration.

In 2019, 4,004,960 travelers entered this station, which placed it in the 118th position of metro stations for its use.

== Passenger services ==
=== Access ===
The station has four entrances, all made up of fixed stairs, the first three are decorated with a balustrade and an Adolphe Dervaux candelabra:

- Entrance 1 Rue Legendre - opening in front of 79 Avenue de Saint-Ouen and 193 of Rue Legendre;
- Entrance 2 Rue de la Jonquiere - located to the right of 73 Rue Guy-Môquet and 1 Rue de la Jonquiere;
- Entrance 3 Avenue de Saint-Ouen - located opposite 86 Avenue de Saint-Ouen and 253 Rue Marcadet;
- Entrance 4 Rue Lamarck - adorned with an entourage in the characteristic Nord-Sud style, leads to the right of 68 & 70 Avenue de Saint-Ouen.

=== Station layout ===
G	Street Level	Exit/Entrance
B1	Mezzanine	Fare control, connection between platform
B2	Side platform, doors will open on the right
B2	Northbound	← toward Saint-Denis – Université (Porte de Saint-Ouen)
B2	Southbound	toward Châtillon – Montrouge (La Fourche) →
B2	Side platform, doors will open on the right

=== Platform ===
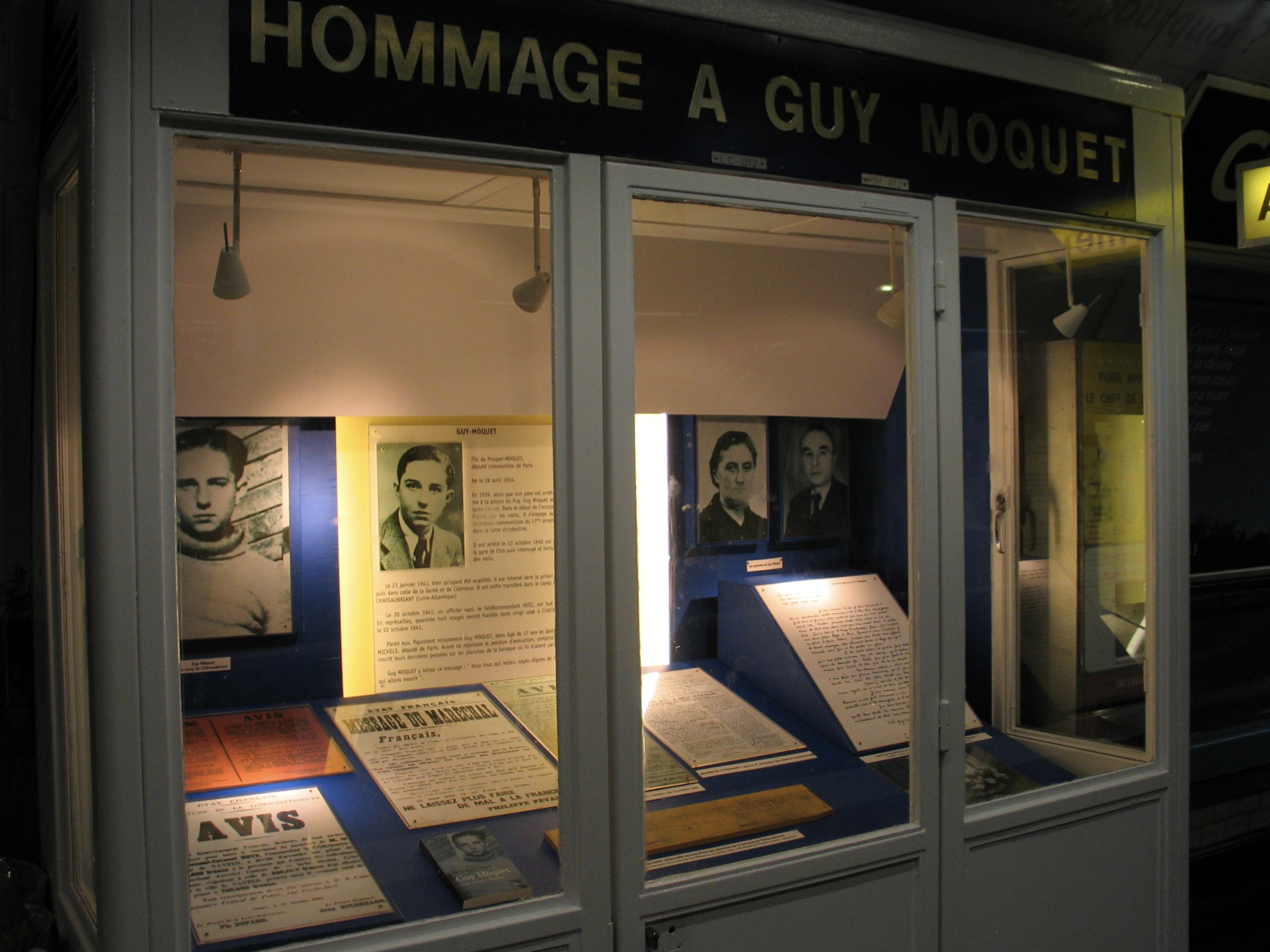
Memorial 2007

Guy Môquet is a standard configuration station. It has two platforms separated by the metro tracks and the vault is semi-elliptical, a shape specific to the old Nord-South stations. The tiles and ceramics take up the original decoration with advertising frames and the surrounds of the name of the station in brown color with brown geometric designs on the walls and the vault. The station name is inscribed in white earthenware on a blue background in small font above the advertising frames and very large fonts between these frames, as well as the station directions incorporated into the ceramic on the tunnel exits. The bevelled white earthenware tiles cover the walls, the vault and the tunnel exits. The lighting is provided by two canopy strips and the seats are Akiko style, in a burgundy colour.

In the middle of one of the platforms, a display case displays reproductions of photographs of Guy Môquet, his mother, and his father Prosper Môquet, his last letter and various documents. On the occasion of 22 October 2007 commemoration, the shelves were repainted and the lighting equipment was renewed.

During the renovation of the station in 2010, as part of the Renouveau du métro program, on 28 May 2010, the RATP unveiled the new thematic layout replacing this showcase with a 4 m by 1.70 m fresco in memory of Guy Môquet, designed in collaboration with the l’Amicale Châteaubriant-Voves-Rouillé and created by the design agency Curius.

=== Bus connections ===
The station is served by lines 21, 31 and the urban service Traverse Batignolles-Bichat of the RATP Bus Network.

== Nearby ==
- Hôpital Bretonneau
- Square Carpeaux
- Square des Épinettes
