= Garibaldi station (Paris Metro) =

Underground station in Paris

Garibaldi
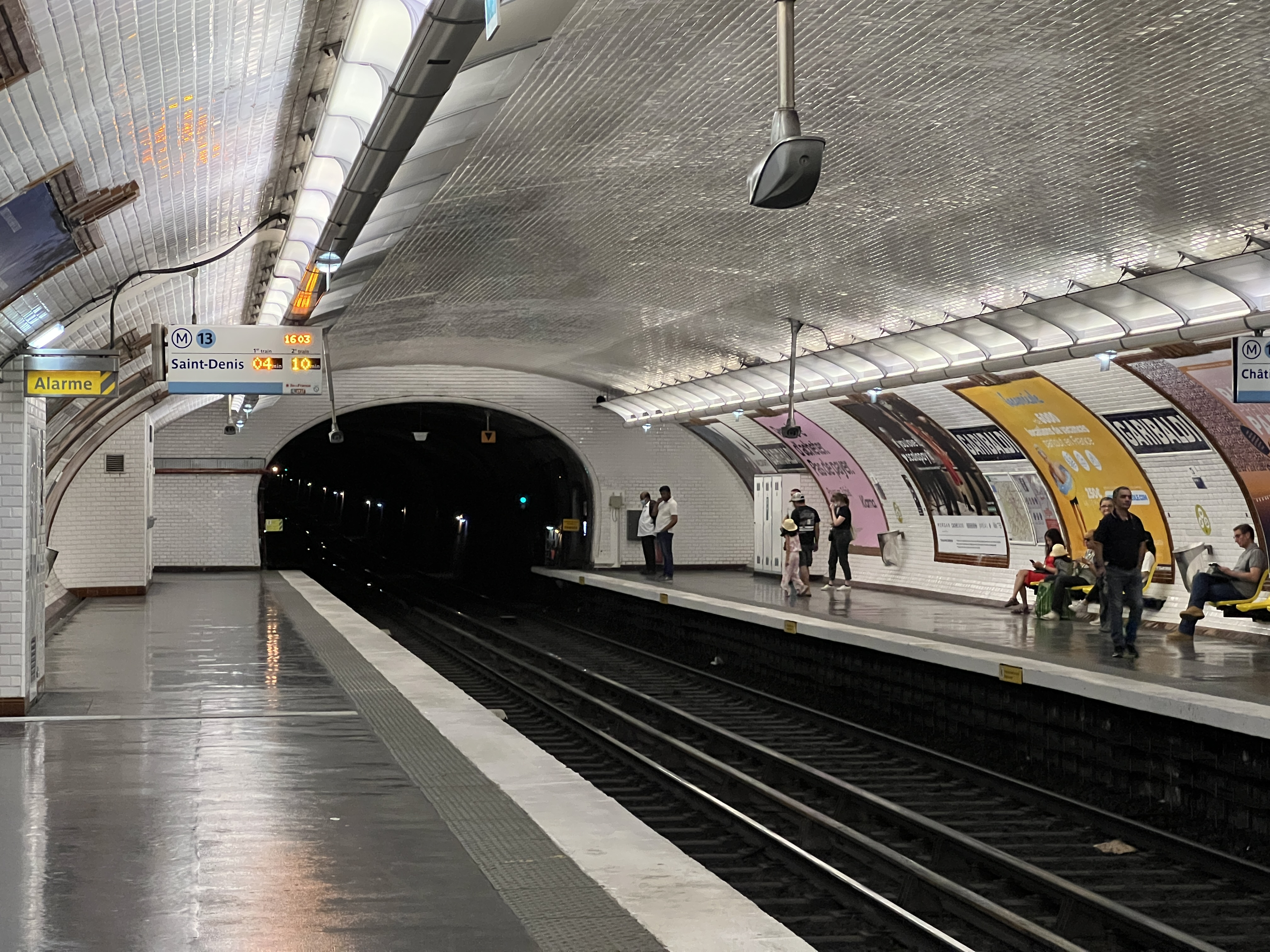

General information
- Location: Saint-Ouen, Seine-Saint-Denis; Île-de-France; France
- Coordinates: 48°54′23″N 2°19′55″E
- System: Paris Métro station
- Owner: RATP
- Operator: RATP

Other information
- Fare zone: 2

History
- Opened: 30 June 1952

Services
Preceding station	Paris Metro	Following station
Porte de Saint-Ouen towards Châtillon–Montrouge	Line 13 Saint-Denis branch	Mairie de Saint-Ouen towards Saint-Denis–Université
Location
- Location within Paris

Garibaldi (French pronunciation: [ɡaʁibaldi]) is a station on line 13 of the Paris Métro in the commune of Saint-Ouen.

== Location ==
The station is located under Avenue Gabriel-Péri, south of the beginning of Rue Charles-Schmidt. Oriented approximately along a north–south axis and located on the branch towards Saint-Denis - Université, it is positioned between the Mairie de Saint-Ouen and Porte de Saint-Ouen metro stations.

== History ==
The station opened on 30 June 1952 when the line was extended from Porte de Saint-Ouen to Carrefour Pleyel.

It owes its name to its proximity to rue Garibaldi, which pays homage to Giuseppe Garibaldi (1807–1882) who was one of the architects of Italian unification. A staunch republican, desiring Rome as the capital of Italy, he fought against Austria in 1859, the Kingdom of Naples in 1860 and the papacy in 1867. He also served France during the conflict of 1870–1871.

The station is, with Mairie de Saint-Ouen and Carrefour Pleyel on the same section of the line, one of the last three built in the historic style of the network, characterized by the use of bevelled white tiles and an ovoid-shaped vault, before the appearance of the first box stations in the 1970s.

As part of RATP's Renouveau du métro program, the station corridors and platform lighting were renovated on 25 August 2004.

In 2020, with the COVID-19 crisis, 1,697,555 travellers entered this station, which places it in 148th position among metro stations for its use.

== Passenger services ==
=== Access ===
The station has three accesses divided into four metro entrances, opening on either side of Avenue Gabriel-Péri and decorated with balustrades as well as three Dervaux-type candelabra:

- Access 1 Rue Garibaldi, consisting of a fixed staircase, located to the right of no. 80 of the avenue;
- Access 2 Rue Farcot, also made up of a fixed staircase, located opposite no. 78 of the avenue;
- Access 3 Rue Charles-Schmidt, comprising two exits, one in front of the other, to the right of no. 65 bis of the avenue; one consists of a fixed staircase and the other of an escalator ascending from the exit corridor of the platform in the direction of Saint-Denis - Université.

=== Station layout ===
G	Street Level	Exit/Entrance
B1	Mezzanine	Fare control, connection between platform
B2	Side platform, doors will open on the right
B2	Northbound	← toward Saint-Denis – Université (Mairie de Saint-Ouen)
B2	Southbound	toward Châtillon – Montrouge (Porte de Saint-Ouen) →
B2	Side platform, doors will open on the right

=== Platforms ===
Garibaldi is a standard configuration station. It has two platforms separated by the metro tracks and the vault is elliptical. The decoration is of the style used for the majority of metro stations. The lighting canopies are white and rounded in the Gaudin style of the metro revival of the 2000s, and the bevelled white ceramic tiles cover the walls, the vault, the tunnel exits and the outlets of the corridors. The advertising frames, in copper-coloured earthenware, are topped with the letter M (a variant found only in 7 other stations in the network) and the name of the station is also in earthenware in the style of the original CMP. The Motte style seats are yellow in colour.

=== Bus connections ===
The station is served by lines 137, 237 and the urban service L'Audonienne of the RATP Bus Network and, at night, by lines N14 and N44 of the Noctilien network.

The station had a connection with the Saint-Ouen-les-Docks line, at the Gare de Saint-Ouen-Garibaldi, until the latter closed in 1988.
