= Guy Môquet =

French Resistance hero and communist activist (1924-1941)

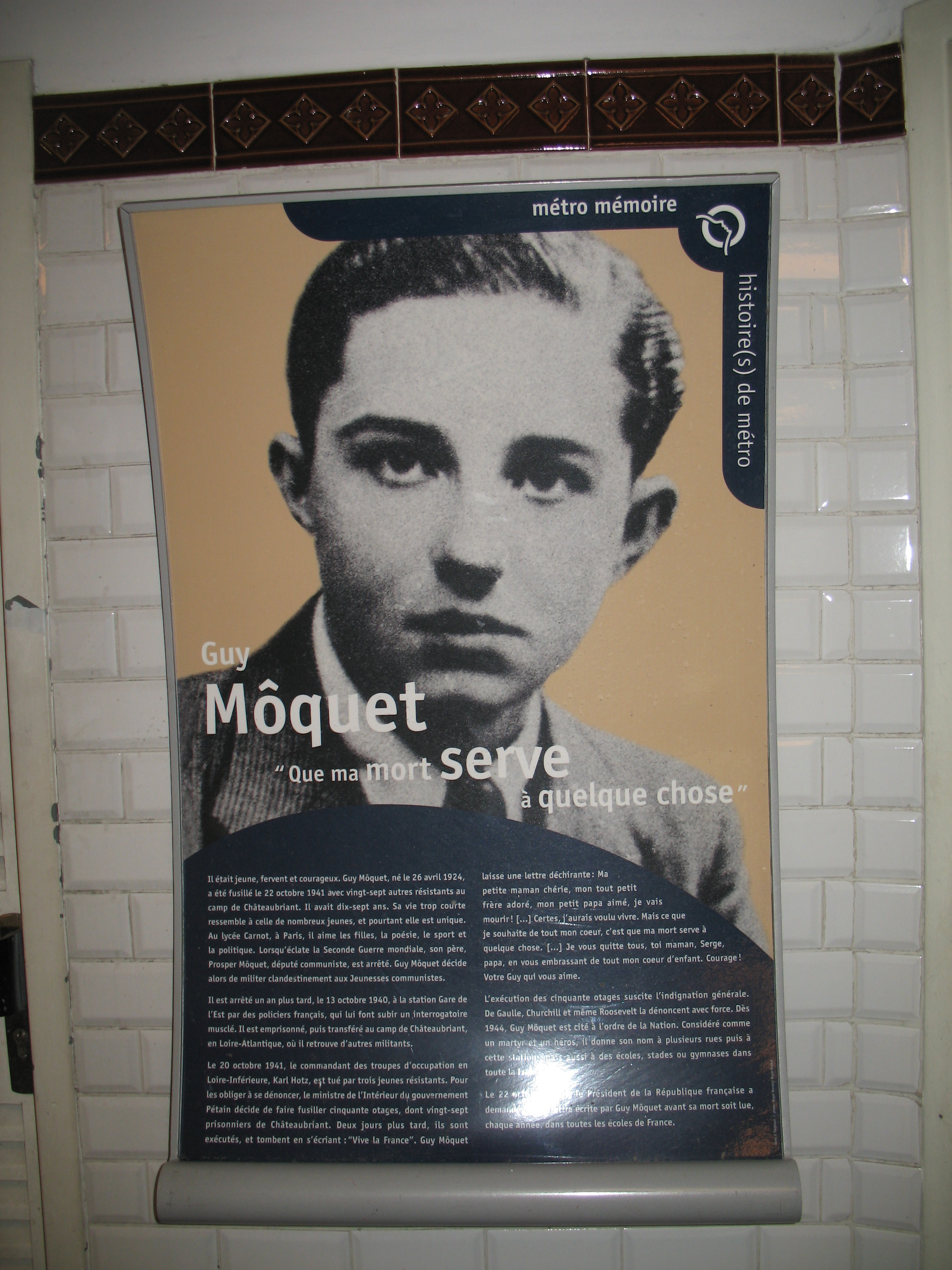
Portrait of Guy Môquet at the Paris Métro station that bears his name

Guy Prosper Eustache Môquet (French pronunciation: [ɡi pʁɔspɛʁ østaʃ mokɛ], 26 April 1924 – 22 October 1941) was a young French Communist activist. During the German occupation of France in World War II, he was taken hostage by the Nazis and executed by firing squad in Châteaubriant in retaliation for attacks on Germans by the French Resistance; Môquet went down in history as one of its symbols. The farewell letter he wrote to his family at age 17 is now a mandatory reading in all French high schools.

== Biography ==
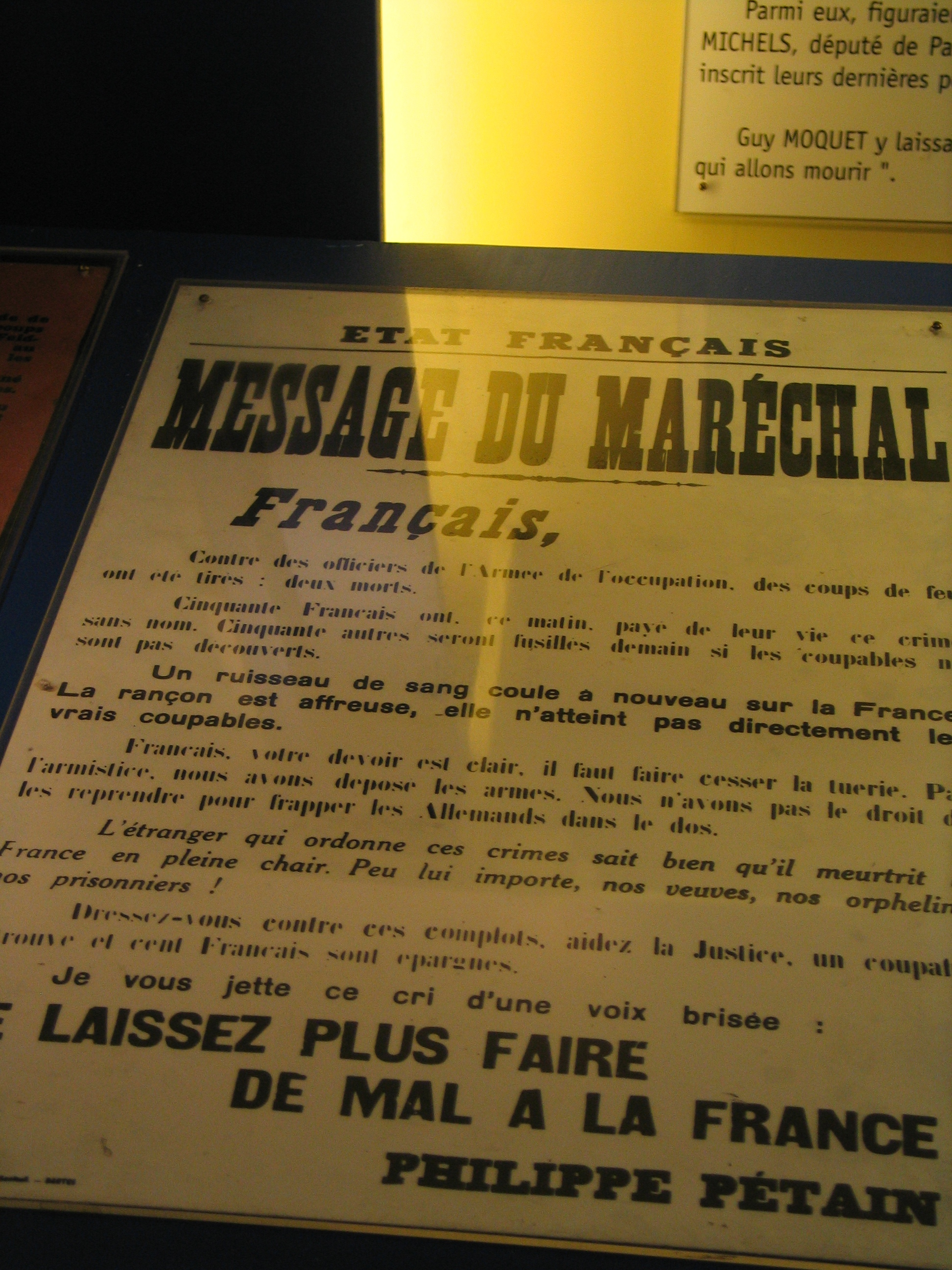
Philippe Pétain announces the execution.

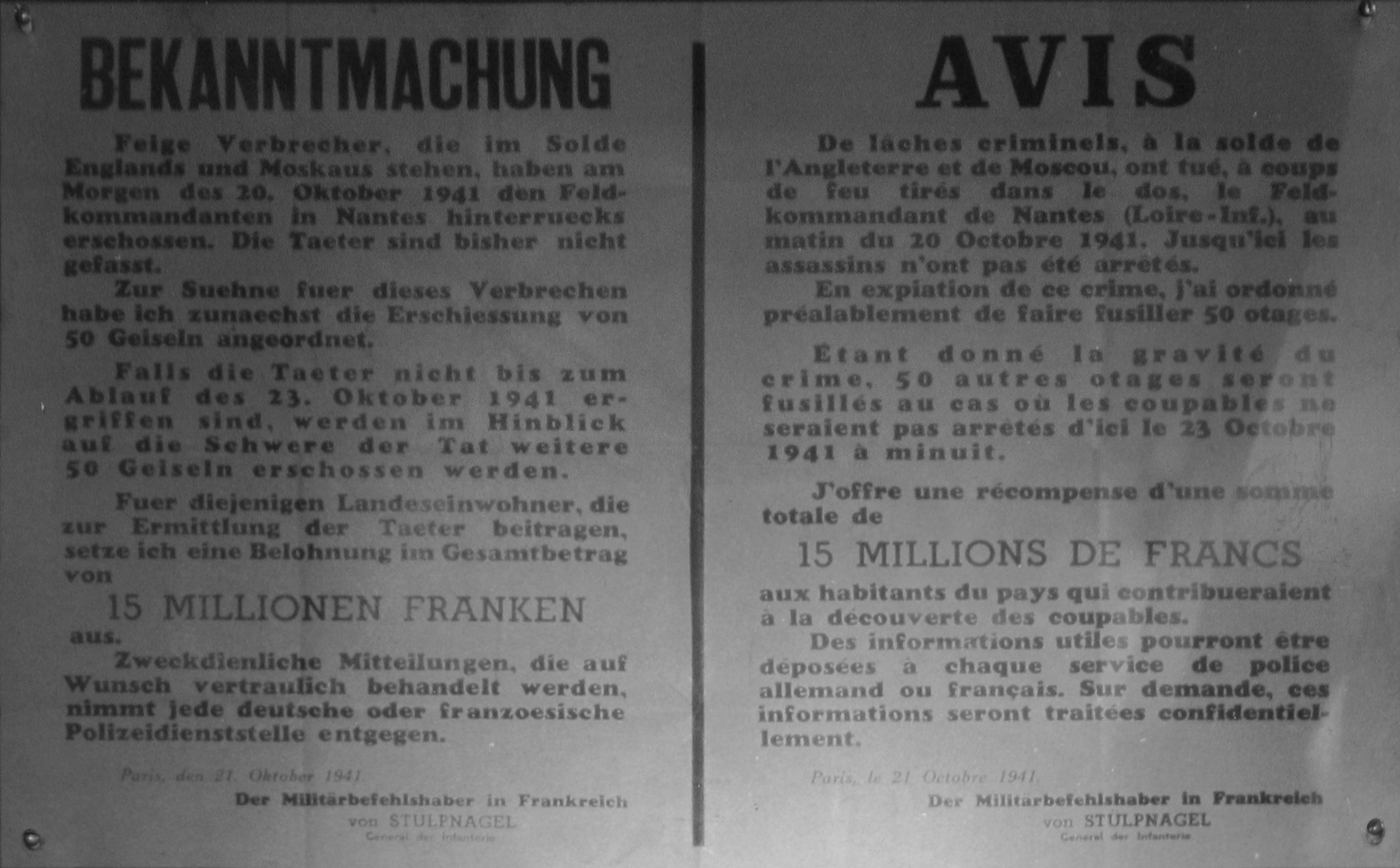
As does General Otto von Stülpnagel

Guy Prosper Eustache Môquet was born on 26 April 1924 in the 18th arrondissement of Paris. He studied at the Lycée Carnot and joined the Communist Youth Movement. After the occupation of Paris by the Germans and the installation of the Vichy government, he was denounced on 13 October 1940 and arrested at the Gare de l'Est metro station by three police officers of the French Anti-Communist Special Brigade. He had with him a poem about three of his arrested comrades, handwritten by him:

[…]

"Les traîtres de notre pays
Ces agents du capitalisme
Nous les chasserons hors d’ici
Pour instaurer le socialisme
[…]
Pour vous sortir de la prison
Pour tuer le capitalisme"
[…]

[…]
"The traitors of our country
These agents of capitalism
We will drive them away
In order to establish socialism
[…]
To get you out of jail
To kill capitalism"

[…]

Imprisoned in Fresnes Prison, then in Clairvaux, he was later transferred to the camp at Châteaubriant, where other Communists were detained.

On 20 October 1941, the commanding officer of the German occupation forces in Loire-Atlantique, Karl Hotz, was assassinated by three communist resisters. Pierre Pucheu, Interior Minister of the government of Marshal Philippe Pétain, chose Communist prisoners to be given as hostages "in order to avoid letting 50 good French people get shot." His selection comprised 18 imprisoned in Nantes, 27 at Châteaubriant, and 5 from Nantes who were imprisoned in Paris.

Two days later, the 27 prisoners at Châteaubriant were shot in three groups. They refused blindfolds, and died crying out "Vive la France" ("Long live France"). Guy Môquet, the youngest, was executed at 4 pm.

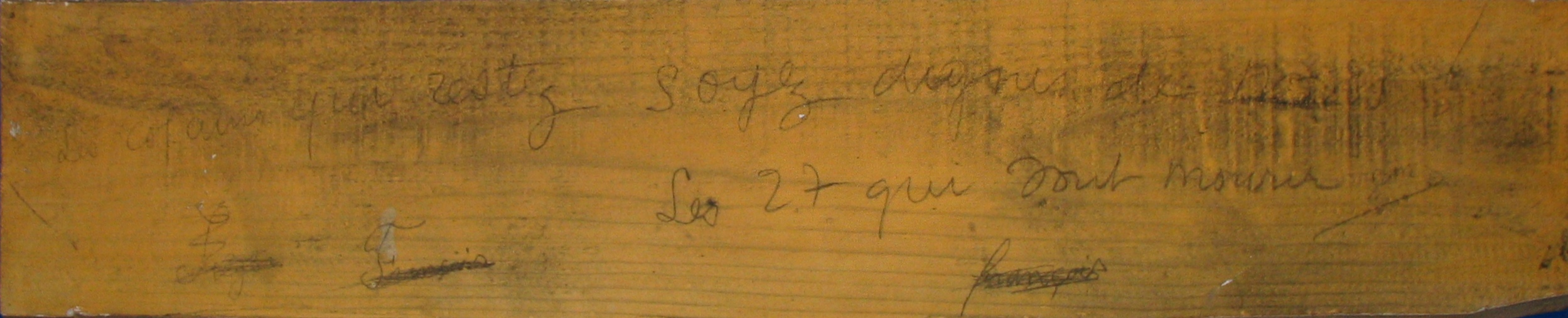
Facsimile of his famous last words: "Les copains qui restez, soyez dignes de nous! Les 27 qui vont mourir." or "Friends who remain, be worthy of us! The 27 who are going to die"

Before being shot, Môquet had written a letter to his parents. This letter has become famous (see section "Legacy" below), especially when it is put in relation with his political activism.

His younger brother, Serge – 12 years old at the time – was traumatized by Guy's death and survived him only by a few days.

== Legacy ==
Guy Môquet was arrested in 1940 distributing propaganda against the war. This policy reversed after resistance appeared as the only way to fight Nazism directly inside France, and after resistance movements started gaining strength (about the same time as Charles de Gaulle's appeal of 18 June 1940). The Communist party offered itself as the leader of French resistance to German occupation and internal French Nazi forces. Môquet was one of those thus celebrated, not least because of his now famous last letter before his execution. This ideal was embraced in France for several decades after the war. The PCF is commonly referred to as the "party of the 75,000 executed people". A street and a Métro station in Paris were named after him in 1946. Many other place names across France also bear his name and Châteaubriant dedicated a high school to him.

Louis Aragon dedicated to him, along with three other resistants (Gabriel Péri, Honoré d'Estienne d'Orves, and Gilbert Dru, all together two Christians and two Communists), his poem "La rose et le réséda." This poem contained the line "Celui qui croyait au Ciel / Celui qui n’y croyait pas". (He who believed in Heaven / He who believed not, those who believed in heaven being the resistants who believed in an ideal of justice).

Guy Môquet was portrayed in a short film in French, La lettre ("The letter"), released in 2007, with the title role played by Jean-Baptiste Maunier. Môquet is also one of the principal characters in the 2011 film Calm at Sea, which depicts the events that culminated in the execution of the hostages. Môquet is portrayed by Léo-Paul Salmain.

== The last letter ==
" My darling Mummy, my adored brother, my much loved Daddy, I am going to die! What I ask of you, especially you Mummy, is to be brave. I am, and I want to be, as brave as all those who have gone before me. Of course, I would have preferred to live. But what I wish with all my heart is that my death serves a purpose. I didn’t have time to embrace Jean. I embraced my two brothers Roger and Rino (1). As for my real brother, I cannot embrace him, alas! I hope all my clothes will be sent back to you. They might be of use to Serge, I trust he will be proud to wear them one day. To you, my Daddy to whom I have given many worries, as well as to my Mummy, I say goodbye for the last time. Know that I did my best to follow the path that you laid out for me. A last adieu to all my friends, to my brother whom I love very much. May he study hard to become a man later on. Seventeen and a half years, my life has been short, I have no regrets, if only that of leaving you all. I am going to die with Tintin, Michels. Mummy, what I ask you, what I want you to promise me, is to be brave and to overcome your sorrow. I cannot put any more. I am leaving you all, Mummy, Serge, Daddy, I embrace you with all my child’s heart. Be brave! Your Guy who loves you. "

(1) His brothers in arms

== 2007 controversy ==
Following the release of the film, French President Nicolas Sarkozy requested Moquet's final letter to be read in every high school in France on the anniversary of his death. This raised controversy for two distinct reasons:

- Ideological reason: Nicolas Sarkozy, president of the French right-wing UMP party, was seen by many as the exact embodiment of the values Guy Môquet had been fighting at the cost of his life. The same commentators argued this was a very cynical attempt by Sarkozy to move his political agenda forward, and to use the legacy of his direct political enemies (the French Communist Party) as his own.
- Administrative reasons: During his mandate, president Sarkozy repeatedly caused a lot of frustration by often bypassing administrative rules of the French Republic and interfering in domains that were normally not those of the President of the French Republic. Some commentators disliked this example of political micromanagement and some high schools resisted it.

== 2009 controversy ==
A 2009 circular to lycées from the Ministry of Education was widely interpreted as meaning that the formal reading of his letter at school was no longer a compulsory part of the curriculum. It called for "teaching time devoted to" bringing pupils and former resistants together, as well as the reading of texts: Guy Môquet's last letter to his family, letters of young condemned men or other texts demonstrating the participation of young people during those dark years in Europe. These readings were "left to the discretion of each [headteacher]". However, on 19 October 2009, the Ministry of Education clarified in the media that the later circular had not been intended to make reading the letter optional. It controversially said that the teaching profession did not have a free hand in teaching what it wanted but were civil servants who must follow directives.

== Bibliography ==
- Albert Ouzoulias, Les Bataillons de la Jeunesse, Éditions Sociales, 1972, ISBN 2-209-05372-2;
- Pierre-Louis Basse, Guy Môquet, une enfance fusillée, Stock, 2000; ISBN 978-2-234-05271-0;
- Articles Prosper Moquet, Henri Môquet, Charles Michels, Jean-Pierre Timbaud; from Dictionnaire biographique du mouvement ouvrier français (le Maitron), Éditions Ouvrières.
- Lettres des fusillés de Châteaubriant, Amicale de Châteaubriand Voves-Rouillé, 1989.
