= Coulombs, Eure-et-Loir =

Coulombs
- Commune
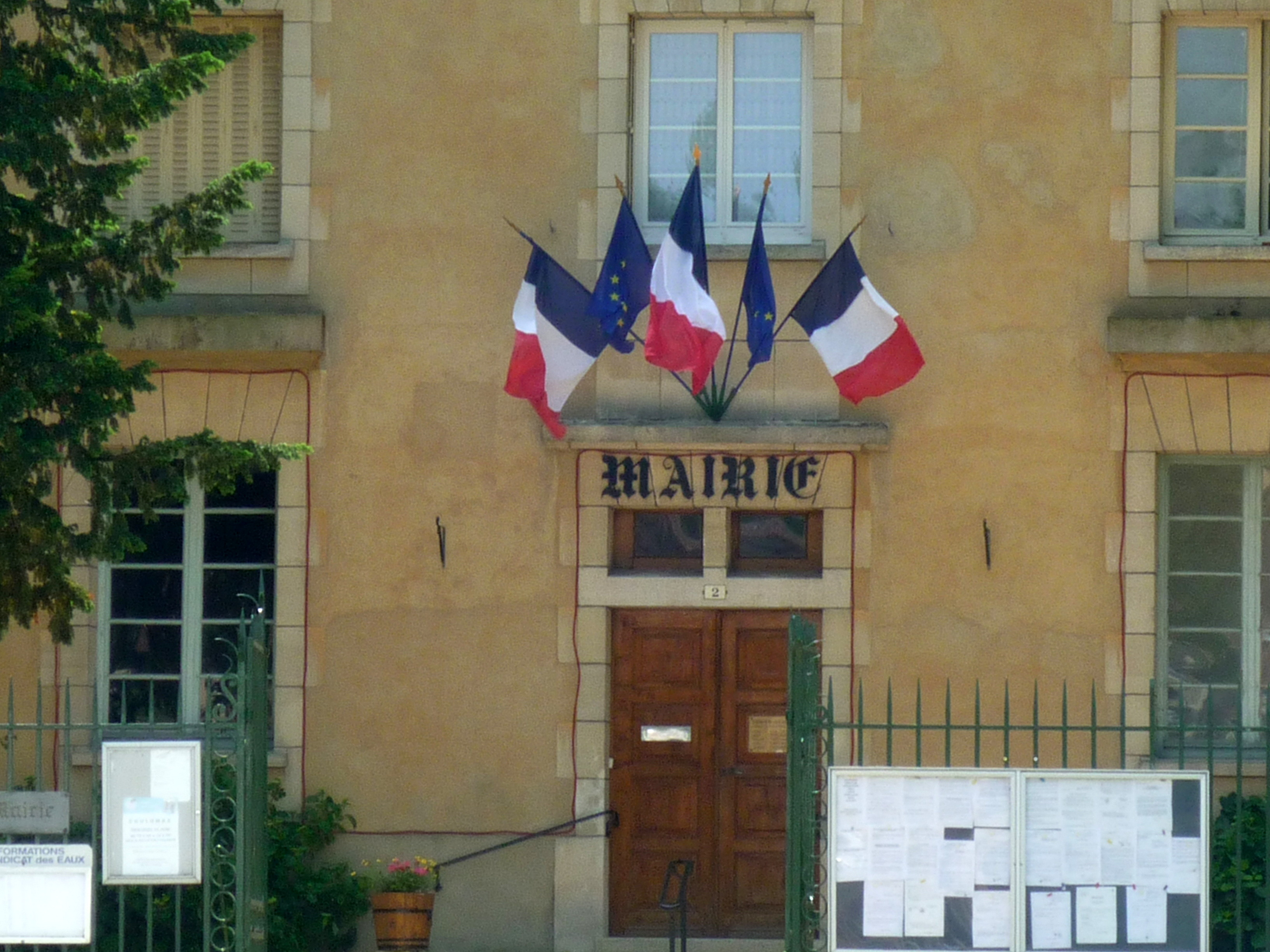
- The town hall in Coulombs

- Coat of arms
- Location of Coulombs
- Location within France Location within Centre-Val de Loire
- Coordinates: 48°39′13″N 1°32′42″E
- Country: France
- Region: Centre-Val de Loire
- Department: Eure-et-Loir
- Arrondissement: Dreux
- Canton: Épernon

Government
  - Mayor (2020–2026): Jean-Nöel Marie
- Area^{1}: 12.48 km^{2} (4.82 sq mi)
- Elevation: 90 m (300 ft)
- Highest elevation: 148 m (486 ft)
- Lowest elevation: 91 m (299 ft)
- Population (2023): 1,363
  - Density: 109.2/km^{2} (282.9/sq mi)
- Time zone: UTC+01:00 (CET)
  - Summer (DST): UTC+02:00 (CEST)
- INSEE/Postal code: 28113 /28210
- ^{1} French Land Register data, which excludes lakes, ponds, glaciers > 1 km^{2} (0.386 sq mi or 247 acres) and river estuaries.

Coulombs (French pronunciation: [kulɔ̃]) is a commune in the Eure-et-Loir department in northern France.

== Population ==
Historical population
Year	Pop.	±% p.a.
1968	606	—
1975	714	+2.37%
1982	868	+2.83%
1990	1,244	+4.60%
1999	1,265	+0.19%
2007	1,305	+0.39%
2012	1,466	+2.35%
2017	1,353	−1.59%
2023	1,363	+0.12%
Source: INSEE

== See also ==
- Communes of the Eure-et-Loir department
