= Paris Metro Line 13 =

Subway route in the French capital

Line 13
- Paris Metro Line 13
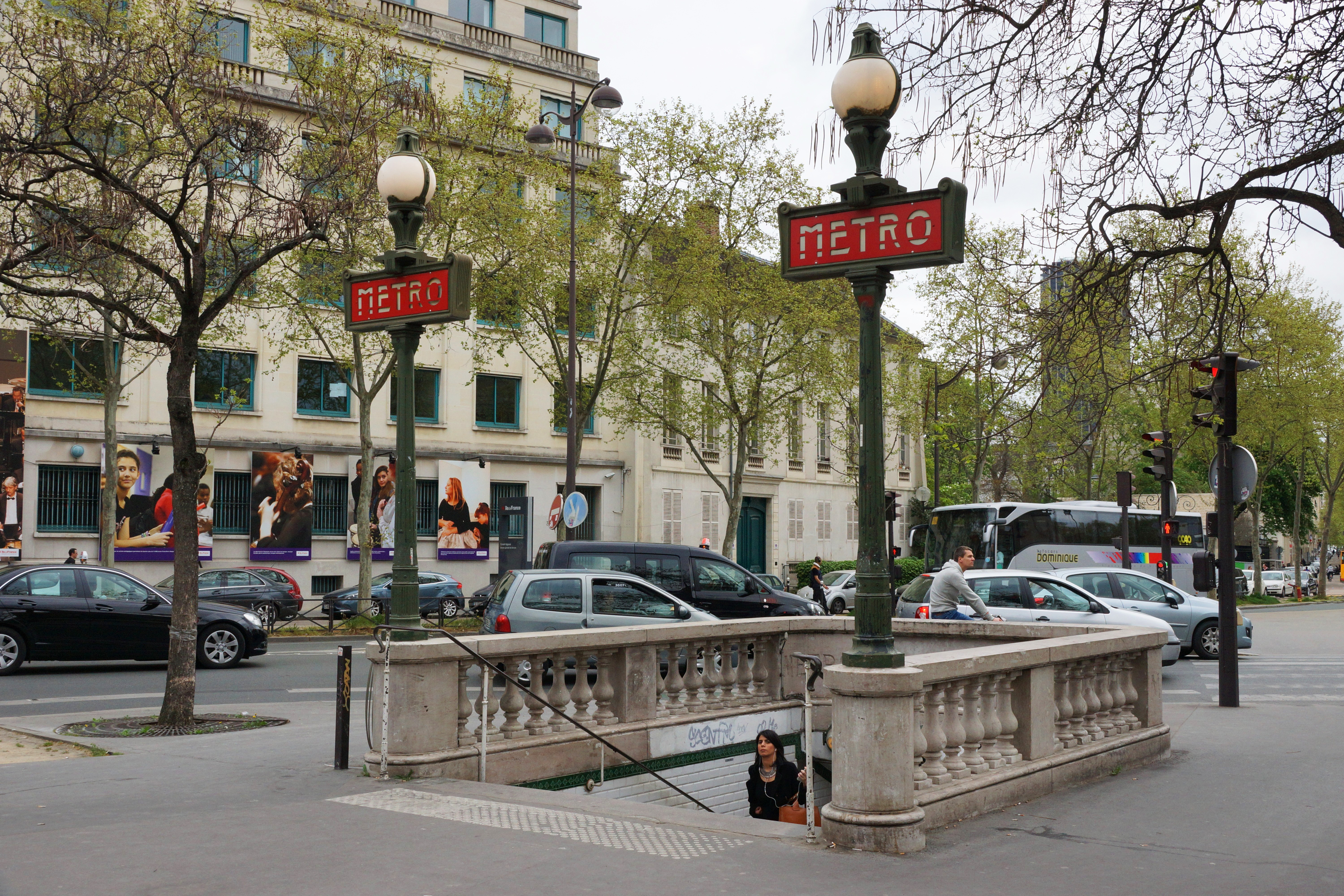
- Entrance to Saint-François-Xavier in the 7th arrondissement

Overview
- Locale: Asnières-sur-Seine, Gennevilliers, Clichy, Saint-Denis, Saint-Ouen-sur-Seine, Paris, Malakoff, Vanves, Châtillon, Montrouge
- Termini: Saint-Denis-Université or Les Courtilles; Châtillon–Montrouge
- Connecting lines: Paris Metro Paris Metro Line 1 Paris Metro Line 2 Paris Metro Line 3 Paris Metro Line 4 Paris Metro Line 6 Paris Metro Line 8 Paris Metro Line 9 Paris Metro Line 10 Paris Metro Line 12 Paris Metro Line 14 RER RER C RER E Transilien Transilien Line J (Paris-Saint-Lazare) Transilien Line L (Paris-Saint-Lazare) Transilien Line N (Paris-Montparnasse) Tramways in Île-de-France Île-de-France tramway Line 1 Île-de-France tramway Line 3a Île-de-France tramway Line 3b Île-de-France tramway Line 5 Île-de-France tramway Line 6 Île-de-France tramway Line 8
- Stations: 32

Service
- System: Paris Metro
- Operator: RATP
- Rolling stock: MF 77 (64 trains as of 14 November 2026)
- Ridership: 118 million (avg. per year); 6th/16 (2025)

History
- Opened: 26 February 1911; 115 years ago

Technical
- Line length: 24.3 km (15.1 mi)
- Track gauge: 1,435 mm (4 ft 8 1/2 in) standard gauge
- Electrification: 750 V DC third rail
- Conduction system: Conductor (OURAGAN)
- Average inter-station distance: 776 m (2,546 ft)

Paris Metro Line 13 (opened as Line B; French: Ligne 13 du métro de Paris) is one of the sixteen lines of the Paris Metro that are currently open. Built by the Nord-Sud Company as a shuttle servicing both Porte de Clichy and Saint-Ouen from Saint Lazare train station, Line B eventually became Line 13 in 1930, when the Nord-Sud was bought by rival Compagnie du chemin de fer métropolitain de Paris (CMP), while sister lines A became 12, and C the old Line 14. Line 13 was extended in 1976 to reach the northern end of Line 14, which it then absorbed: line number 14, now vacated, was eventually reused for the Météor in 1998.

Line 13 was once planned to be taken over by a north–south RER line connecting the rail yards of Saint Lazare and Montparnasse train stations, but this was cancelled after the reorganisation of the Île-de-France region in 1965. Today, Line 13 connects the western part of Paris to the suburbs of Asnières-sur-Seine, Gennevilliers, Clichy, Saint-Denis and Saint-Ouen-sur-Seine in the north and to Malakoff, Vanves, Châtillon and Montrouge in the south. Serving 32 stations, it is the network's fifth busiest line, with 131.4 million passengers in 2017.

Line 13 will be automated during the 2030s, becoming the third Paris Metro line to be converted from manual to driverless operation, after lines 1 and 4. Lines 14 to 18 have all operated driverless since day one.

== Route ==
Geographically accurate route of Line 13

At 24.3 km (15.1 mi) in length, counting both of its northern branches, it is, as of 2025, the second longest line of the Métro, only being surpassed by line 14. This is due to change when Line 15 will be open in its full scale. In 2004, Line 13 carried over 114 million riders, about 540,000 per weekday. Annual traffic grew by about ten million passengers after the opening of two new stations on the Asnières branch on 14 June 2008, for a total of 610,050 riders a day in December 2009.

Line 13's onboard diagram

Line 13's use of two northern branches serving each highly populated areas, its lengthy extension into the suburbs, as well as the rapid development of the areas it serves, all resulted in the line's overloading, further highlighted by associations representing passengers. It is the most crowded line in the system, especially in its original section.

== History ==
=== Chronology ===
- 26 February 1911: Line B of the Nord-Sud company was opened from Saint-Lazare to Porte de Saint-Ouen.
- 20 January 1912: A second branch of Line B was opened between La Fourche and Porte de Clichy.
- 1930: The Nord-Sud company was bought by the CMP company. Line A became Line 12, B became Line 13, and the Nord-Sud's planned future Line C became line 14.
- 21 January 1937: The original Line 14 was opened between Bienvenüe and Porte de Vanves.
- 27 July 1937: Line 14 was extended north from Bienvenüe to Duroc and took over the section between Duroc and Invalides from Line 10, which in turn took over the section from La Motte-Picquet to Auteuil from Line 8, line 8 which received a brand new section headed to Balard.
- 30 June 1952: Line 13 was extended north from Porte de Saint-Ouen to Carrefour Pleyel.
- 27 June 1973: Line 13 was first extended south, from Saint-Lazare to Miromesnil.
- 1974: Line 13 inaugurates its own centralised control centre.
- 18 February 1975: The line was extended south from Miromesnil to Champs-Elysées – Clémenceau.
- 26 May 1976: The line was extended north from Carrefour Pleyel to Saint-Denis – Basilique.
- 9 November 1976: The line was extended from Champs-Elysées to Invalides, where it took over original line 14 (leaving its number available for Meteor in 1998). The line was extended south from Porte de Vanves to Châtillon – Montrouge. As a result, Line 13 received MF 67 rolling stock, while the MA it initially ran was sent to line 10.
- 1977: Autopilot is activated on Line 13.
- 11 November 1978: Line 13 receives the brand new MF 77 rolling stock, as a means to alleviate the overcrowding of former trains.
- 9 May 1980: The northwestern branch of the line was extended from Porte de Clichy to Gabriel Péri.
- 25 May 1998: The northern branch was extended from Basilique de Saint-Denis to Saint-Denis – Université.
- 2007: RATP starts refurbishment of the MF 77 rolling stock.
- 24 October 2007: Congestion of Line 13 from Saint Lazare up north leads STIF to officialise the extension of Line 14 north Saint Lazare to Mairie de Saint-Ouen, in an effort to alleviate traffic on both branches of line 13.
- 14 June 2008: The northwestern branch was extended from Gabriel Péri to Les Courtilles.
- September 2010: Miromesnil station is the first on the line to be equipped with platform screen doors. All others followed afterwards.
- March 2012: Completion of the MF 77 refurbishment. Trains are brighter, include less yet more comfortable seats, light-up line panels and are pre-wired for the upcoming line's automation.
- September 2018: RATP decides to remove folding seats at the trains' gates in order to increase guest flow in and out at stations.
- December 2020: Efforts to alleviate Line 13's congestion pay off as traffic on the Saint-Denis branch is lowered by 19 to 27% after Line 14's northern extension opens, with only Porte de Clichy station delayed a bit.
- 28 January 2021: Line 14 opens service at Porte de Clichy, connecting line 14 to the Asnières branch of Line 13.
- 2027: Line 13 receives the new MF 19 rolling stock.
- 2035: Completion of Line 13's automation project.

=== Line B of the Nord-Sud Company ===
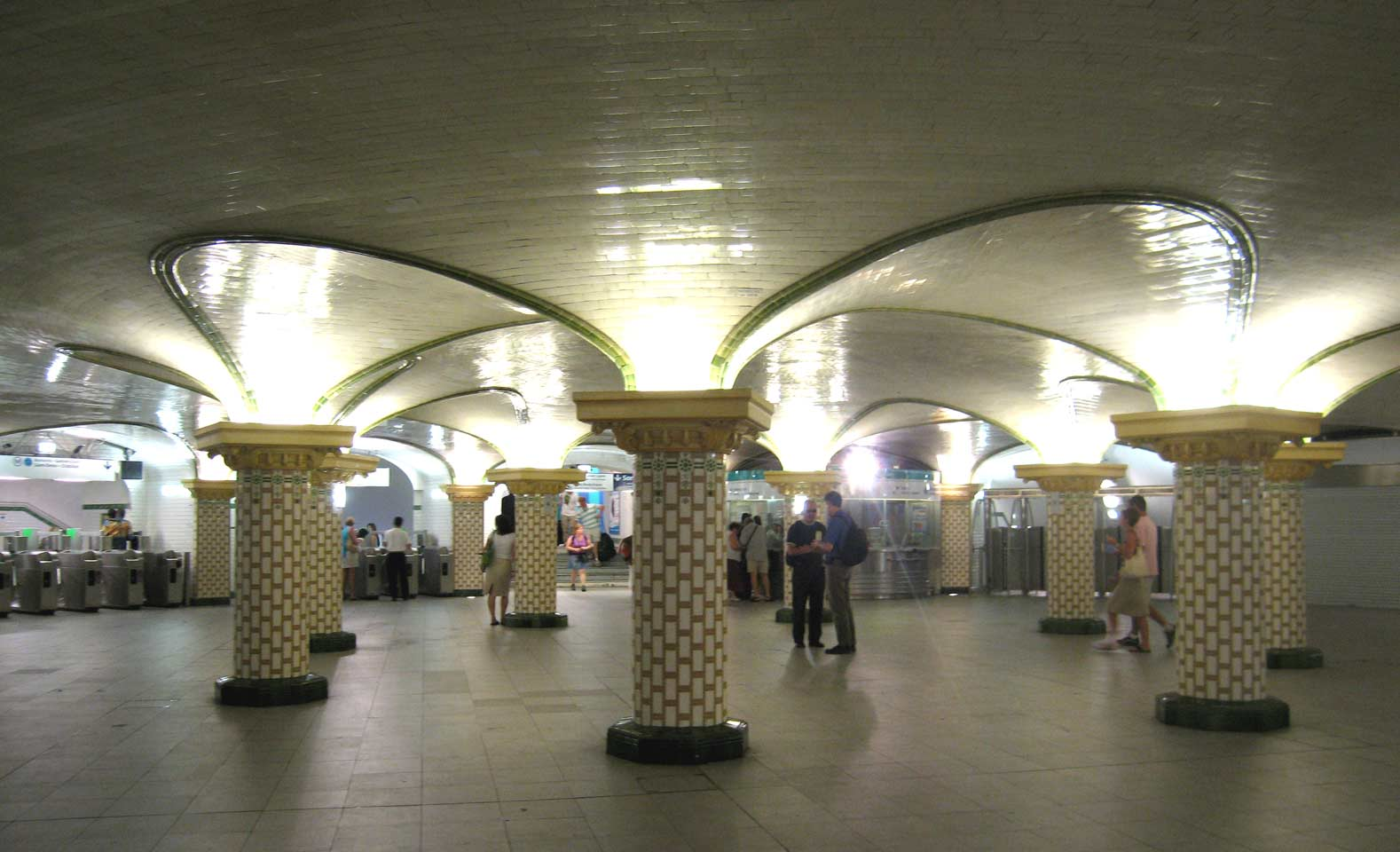
Rotunda of Saint-Lazare station

On 28 December 1901, the Société du chemin de fer éléctrique souterrain Nord-Sud de Paris, or Nord-Sud Company, obtained a concession from the City of Paris to build a rapid transit network of two lines concurrent with the more prominent CMP, which had already opened the first Metro lines of Fulgence Bienvenüe's project.

Connecting Porte de Saint-Ouen (Paris Métro) and Saint-Lazare (Paris Métro), the construction of Line B began on 19 June 1905 with 2.8 km (1.7 mi) of track. Four years later, building commenced on the branch to Porte de Clichy. The line ran under Rue d'Amsterdam until its split at La Fourche, with each branch following either the Avenue de Clichy or the Avenue de Saint-Ouen. No connection was provided to the CMP network.

On 26 February 1911, Line B opened between Saint-Lazare and Porte de Saint-Ouen, with the northwestern branch to Porte de Clichy opening a year later. Due to the narrow width of Rue d'Amsterdam, Berlin (renamed to Liège) station was built unusually with non-aligned platforms. The Nord-Sud Company operated Line B with 368 trains per day, a minimum of 2.5-minute headways.

On 1 January 1930, the CMP absorbed the Nord-Sud Company and renamed Line B to Line 13 in accordance with its numerical naming policy. The electrical supply also needed to be changed, since the Nord-Sud Company used overhead power cables, while the CMP relied on third rail technology. In order to allow interoperability, Line 13 was switched to third rail power.

== Overcrowding ==
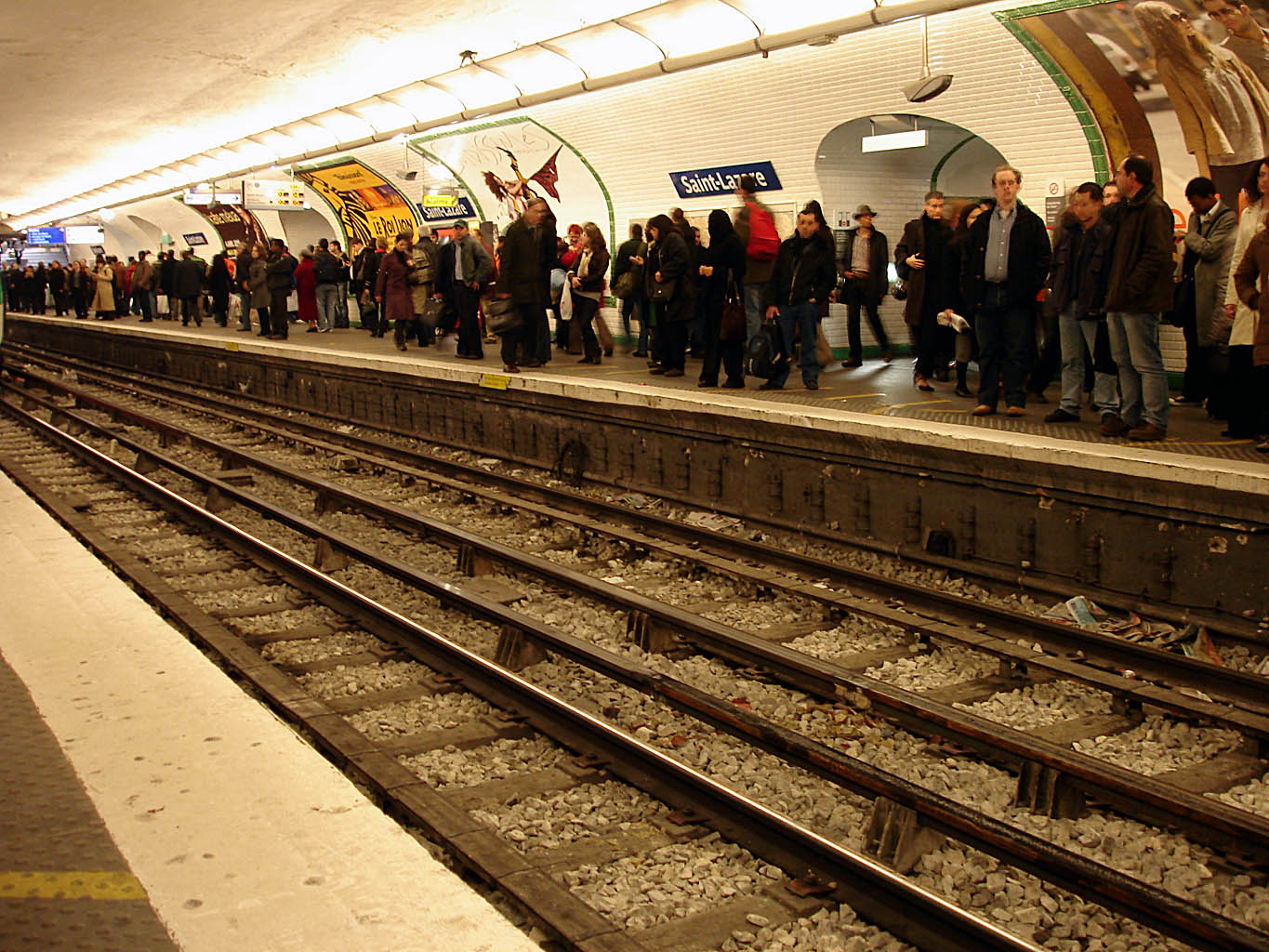
Saint-Lazare station at rush hour

Line 13 is perhaps the least-appreciated line of the Métro by its riders and is the object of a number of criticisms due to its constant overcrowding, especially from Saint-Lazare north where the line splits in two, leading to reduced frequencies. Nicknamed La Bétaillère (the livestock [train]) by locals, it is not rare for passengers to wait for several trains before being able to board due to the sheer volume of users. Within trains, there may be up to 4.5 people per square metre, while the cars on Line 13 can only hold four people per square metre, a percentage of use of 116%.

In December 2003, Line 14's extension to Saint-Lazare increased the number of passengers on Line 13 by over 50% : within a year, the number of people using Saint-Lazare rose from 40.8 million to 64.1 million. This only worsened Line 13's congestion, which by 2005 had become chronic, and unsolvable without infrastructure change.

Important economic development at the Plaine Saint-Denis around a vast urban project since the construction of the Stade de France has also worsened conditions on the line since a number of companies have moved there, forcing more employees to use the line for their commutes. Between 1999 and 2008, the population living in the cities serviced by line 13 rose by 11%, so an approx. 39 000 people augmentation. This was years before the arrival of Line 12 in the area.

In 2007, the delay of the automatic control system named Ouragan led the RATP to propose to STIF the employment of "pushers" (pousseurs, control assistants), responsible for smoother boarding and detraining at the busiest stations on Line 13, namely Saint-Lazare and Place de Clichy.

In 2018, this again worsened as two new development projects put another strain on Line 13 : The new Paris' Tribunal at Porte de Clichy, and the Seat of the Ile de France headquarters at Saint-Ouen. On the other hand, Line 14 was already on the road to alleviate Line 13 by offering a direct service between both.

=== Interim measures ===
The automatic reversal at Châtillon-Montrouge (video)

Since December 2006, more than eighty additional trains have been added to provide supplemental service, a nearly 10% increase including additional Asnières branch service. Two years later, an automatic reversal at Châtillon-Montrouge was introduced, which sent the trains back from a specific parking spot straight into the platform back to Paris without any driver input. This reduces the turn-back time by ten seconds so as to circulate trains every 95 seconds, allowing more departures each day. This has in turn required the installation of platform screen doors at the southern terminus to prevent passengers from falling onto the tracks when no train operator is on deck.

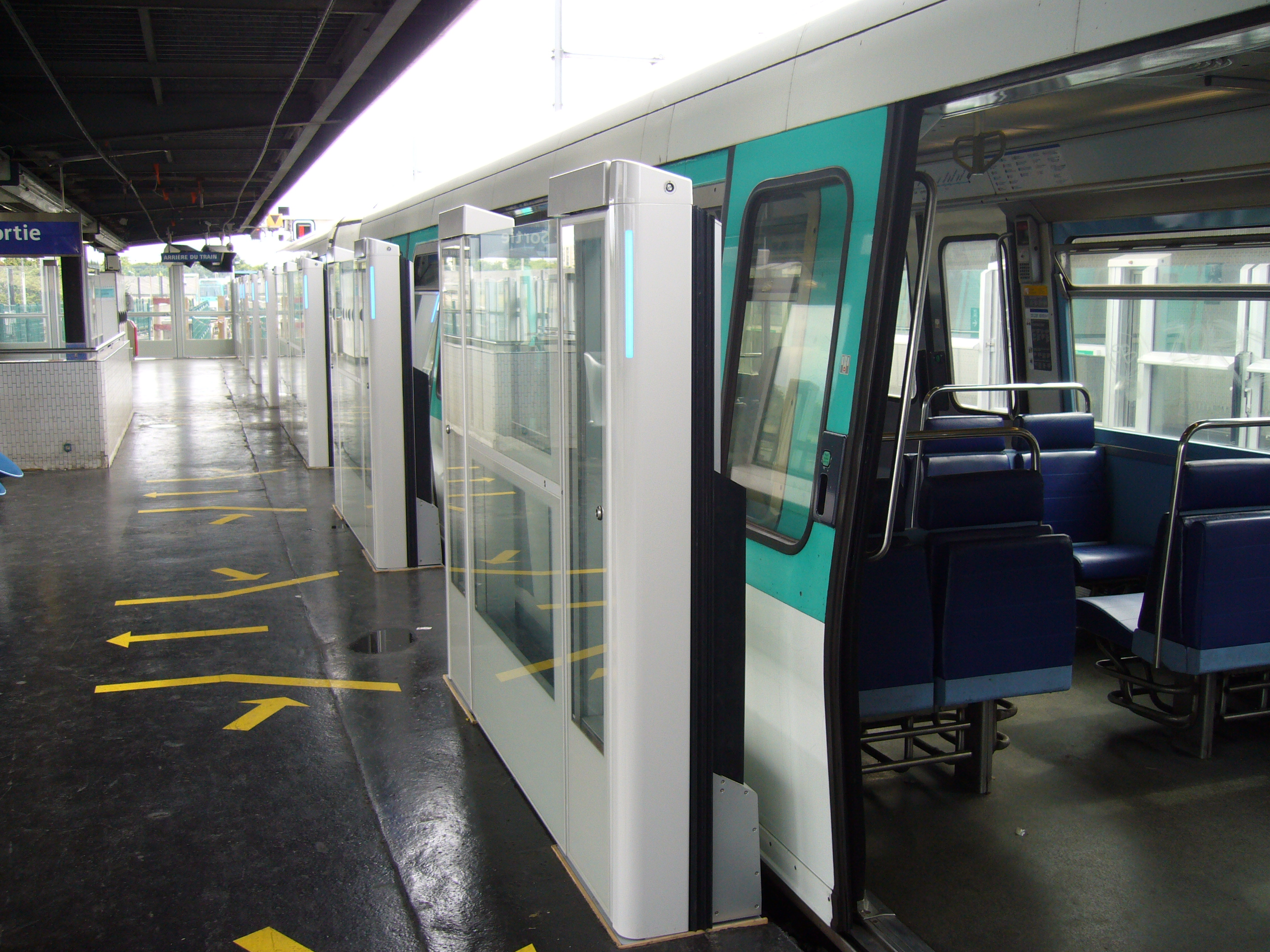
Platform screen doors at Châtillon-Montrouge station

On 17 December 2006, Line 13 has had its own command post and centralised control (poste de commande et de contrôle centralisé, PCC) managed from Malakoff. It involves the coordination of a number of officials to reduce the number of delays and incidents on the line. Since 29 July 2008, the PCC integrates the maneuver and start functions that were previously operated at each terminal.

At the end of 2010, it was revealed that ten stations would receive platform screen door installation in an attempt to increase the average speed of trains and reduce track-related incidents. After a test a few years earlier, the RATP decided that such doors must be built as crowding increases so that passengers cannot fall off the platform; to do this, the agency recruited the Kaba Group to perform automation and installation on Lines 1 and 13. The company uses the ClearSy security system to control door opening and closing. However, the new platform screen doors are not the same as the prototypes installed at Invalides.

On 29 December 2009, the RATP announced that Miromesnil would be the first of twelve stations to be equipped with these doors and that work would begin in June 2010, finishing three months later. After that, Saint-Lazare, Champs-Élysées – Clemenceau, Basilique de Saint-Denis, Saint-Denis – Porte de Paris, Varenne, Saint-François-Xavier, Duroc, Liège, Montparnasse-Bienvenüe, and Place de Clichy, would receive these platform doors, while Invalides would see the prototype ones replaced as well.

Since October 2017, the Saint-Denis branch can be cut at Porte de Saint-Ouen with line 13 working in both directions, in order to mitigate a problem north or south.

==== Line 14 extension north ====
Three large scale solutions were investigated to reduce the congestion on line 13:

- splitting it in two by disbranching the line (thus creating line 13bis),
- extending line 14 to La Fourche and have it take over a branch from Line 13,
- extending line 14 to Porte de Clichy then to Mairie de Saint-Ouen so that it crosses both branches, providing both Clichy and Saint-Ouen a direct rail connection between them, as well as an express link to Saint-Lazare and downtown Paris. To top it all, Line 14 was already scheduled, at the time, to be pushed south to Orly Airport, an important destination for the two popular cities in which immigration is present.

The sheer cost of the first two solutions, combined with the difference in quality for the second one (comfort, accessibility, visual aspect between the line 13 and 14 stations) led the STIF to adopt the last solution in 24 October 2007, with said extension opened in December 2020. According to Île-de-France Mobilités, this extension has removed 19 to 27% of peak hour traffic from line 13. Oddly enough, the idea of extending Line 4 north from Porte de Clignancourt to Mairie de Saint-Ouen, was present on the 2007 studies, although no extension works were taken on ever since.

=== Automation ===
In December 2022, Île-de-France Mobilités and RATP announced that the line would be fully automated by 2035, becoming the 3rd metro line in Paris to be converted to unattended train operation after Line 1 and Line 4. The line will be modernised in two phases - the introduction of the new trains (MF 19) from 2027, followed by the automation of the line in the early 2030s. The automation of the line itself is estimated to cost around €837m.

== Future extensions ==
After the northwestern branch was extended by 1.88 km (1.17 mi) with two more stations, Les Agnettes and Les Courtilles, a further push with a third station (Port de Gennevilliers) is on the drawing board, yet no further steps were taken ahead.

== Renamed stations ==
- 20 January 1912: Marcadet renamed as Marcadet – Balagny.
- 1 August 1914: Berlin renamed as Liège.
- 27 January 1946: Marcadet – Balagny renamed as Guy Môquet.
- 25 May 1998: Saint-Denis – Basilique renamed as Basilique de Saint-Denis.
- 14 June 2008: Gabriel Péri – Asnières – Gennevilliers renamed as Gabriel Péri.

== Tourism ==
Line 13 passes near several places of interest:

- The National Archives (Saint-Denis – Université)
- Saint-Denis's medieval basilica, which contains the tombs of the kings of France (Saint-Denis – Basilique)
- The Stade de France (Saint-Denis – Porte de Paris)
- Saint-Ouen and its famous flea market (Porte de Saint-Ouen & Garibaldi)
- The new Tribunal of Paris (Porte de Clichy)
- The east of Batignolles district (Brochant)
- The west of Montmartre district, including its famous cemetery (Place de Clichy)
- The lower Champs-Élysées near the Grand Palais and the Petit Palais. (Champs-Élysées – Clémenceau)
- The Invalides, which contains among others the tomb of Napoléon Bonaparte (Invalides & Saint-François-Xavier)
- The Rodin museum (Varenne)
- Montparnasse, its famous cafés and the Montparnasse Tower.
- The Porte de Vanves' flea market (Porte de Vanves)

== See also ==
- Paris
- Transport in Paris
- List of stations of the Paris Métro
- List of stations of the Paris RER
- List of metro systems
- Rail transport in France
