= Georges Balagny =

French photographer

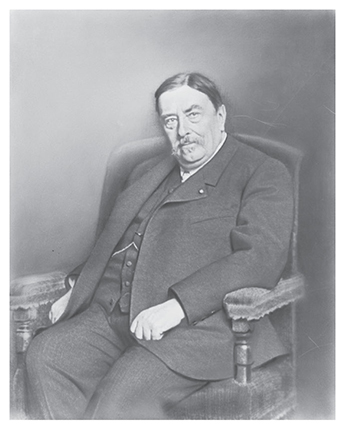
- Born: 16 February 1837; Batignolles, France
- Died: 17 December 1919 (aged 82); Paris, France
- Other name: George Balagny
- Occupation: Photographer
- Parent(s): Auguste Balagny; Adélaïde Léopoldine-Genet

George or Georges Balagny was a French photographer from the Batignolles neighborhood in Paris, France. He was born on 16 February 1837 and died in Paris on 17 December 1919.

Son of Auguste Balagny and Adélaïde Léopoldine Genet, his father was a notary and the future mayor of the 17th arrondissement of Paris, and later of the commune of Maule.

Georges first obtained a law degree followed by a doctorate, before abandoning his legal career in order to dedicate himself to research in photography at his workshop on the Rue Salneuve. He published several texts about his work under the name George Balagny.

He was received as a member of the French Photographic Society (Société française de photographie) and promoted to Officier d’Académie of the Order of Academic Palms.

After purchasing the Château du Buat at Maule, he was married there on 2 July 1872, to Berthe Salneuve, cousin of his father's former deputy. Their only child, Robert Balagny, became a lawyer.

== Publications ==
- Hydroquinone et potasse, nouvelle méthode de développement... Paris: Gauthier-Villars, 1889.
- Traité de photographie par les procédés pelliculaires. Paris: Gauthier-Villars, 1889–1890.
- Les contre-types ou les copies de clichés. Paris: Gauthier-Villars, 1893.
- La Photocollographie. Paris: Gauthier-Villars, 1899.
- Monographie du diamidophénole en liqueur acide, nouvelle méthode de développement... Paris: Gauthier-Villars, 1907.
