= Saint-Denis-Université station =

Paris Métro station

Saint-Denis–Université
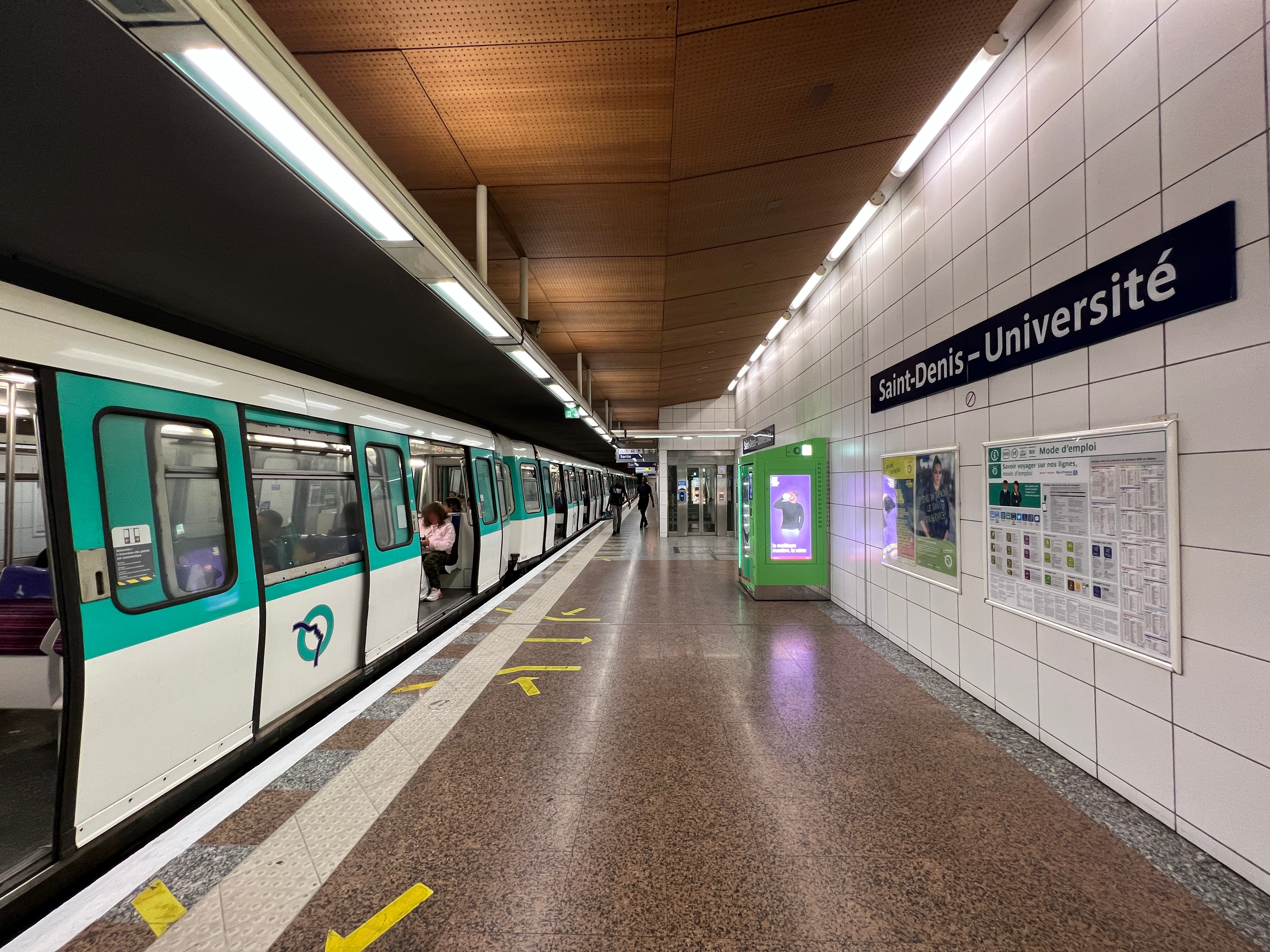
- Station view

General information
- Location: Saint-Denis, Seine-Saint-Denis; Île-de-France; France
- Coordinates: 48°56′45″N 2°21′49″E
- System: Paris Métro station
- Owner: RATP
- Operator: RATP

Construction
- Accessible: yes

Other information
- Fare zone: 1

History
- Opened: 25 May 1998

Services
Preceding station	Paris Metro	Following station
Basilique de Saint-Denis towards Châtillon–Montrouge	Line 13 Saint-Denis branch	Terminus
Location
- Location within Paris and inner ring

Saint-Denis–Université (French pronunciation: [sɛ̃ dəni ynivɛʁsite]) is the terminus of the northeastern branch of Line 13 of the Paris Métro, located in the suburban town of Saint-Denis. It is the most northerly station on the Paris Métro system. It serves the University of Paris 8 Vincennes-Saint-Denis, as well as the new facility of the National Archives, which is located in Pierrefitte-sur-Seine, next to the metro station and bus station.

== History ==
The station and a bus station was opened on 25 May 1998 in the presence of the Minister of Transport Jean-Claude Gayssot after an investment of €525 million (70% financed by the Region) with the extension of the line from Basilique de Saint-Denis.

Initially planned for 1999, a carpark with 300 spaces was inaugurated in September 2001 in the presence of elected officials and the regional prefect, because it was meant to foreshadow Île-de-France's future intermodal transport facilities for its urban transport plan.

The name of the station comes from its immediate proximity to the University of Paris-VIII in Saint-Denis. In 2004, the government chose the site for the new headquarters of the National Archives. Scheduled for 2009, the opening took place in 2013.

In 2020, with the Covid-19 crisis, 2,626,602 travellers entered this station, which places it in the 72nd position of metro stations for its use.

== Passenger services ==
As with all new metro stations since 1992, the station is fully accessible.

=== Access ===
One exit from the station faces the University of Paris VIII and the other overlooks the bus station.

=== Station layout ===
G	Street Level	Exit/Entrance
B1	Mezzanine	Fare control, connection between platform
B2	Side platform, doors will open on the right
B2	Northbound	← termination track
B2	Southbound	toward Châtillon–Montrouge (Basilique de Saint-Denis) →
B2	Side platform, doors will open on the right

=== Platforms ===
The two platforms, flanking the two tracks, are covered by a slab below a large reception hall. There is therefore no intermediate level between the surface and the platforms, a very unusual situation for the Paris metro.

The platforms are in the shape of an I, as at the Basilique de Saint-Denis station, wide at both ends, business premises reduce their width in the centre. The tracks extends beyond the line open to the public, towards a turning point and sidings.

=== Other connections ===
The bus station is served by lines 168, 253, 255, 256, 268, 353 and 356 of the RATP Bus Network and by line 11 of the CIF bus network. Since 29 July 2013, it is possible to reach the T5 at the Guynemer station, located a short distance away.

At night, a connection with the N44 line of the Noctilien is possible a short distance away.

On 5 November 2015, the station benefited from the first secure lockers for bicycles (52 places) (Véligo) on line 13 at 30 € per year.

== Nearby ==
- Université Paris-VIII
- Archives Nationales
- Église Sainte-Jeanne d'Arc de la Mutualité

== Line 13 extension project ==
A subsequent extension of line 13 to the Stains-La Cerisaie station, included in the master plan for the Île-de-France region (SDRIF), adopted in 2008 by its Regional Council, is no longer envisaged. The project no longer appears in the new version of the SDRIF plan adopted on 18 October 2013 and approved by decree of 27 December 2013.

== Gallery ==
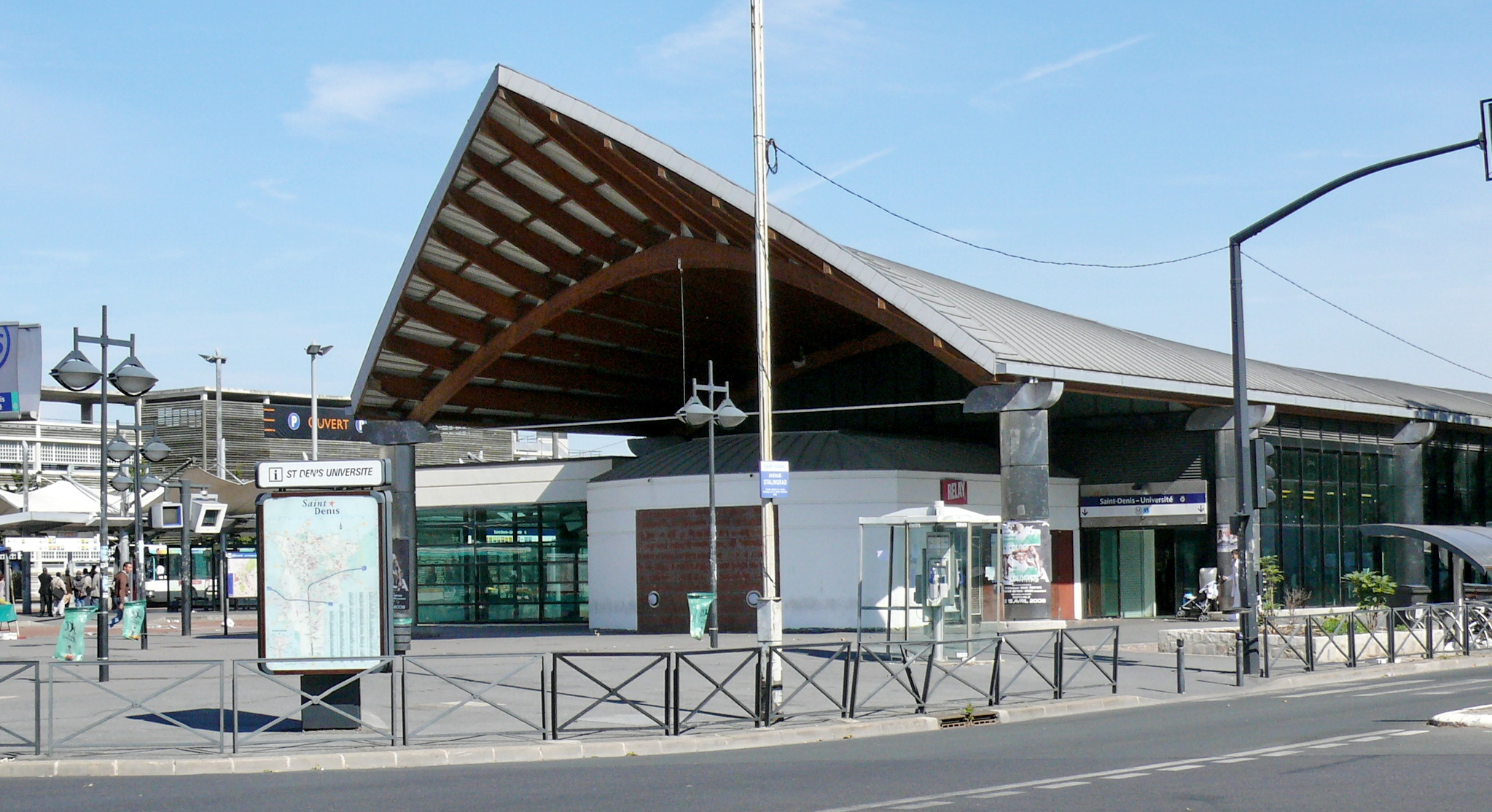
Entrance at Saint-Denis–Université

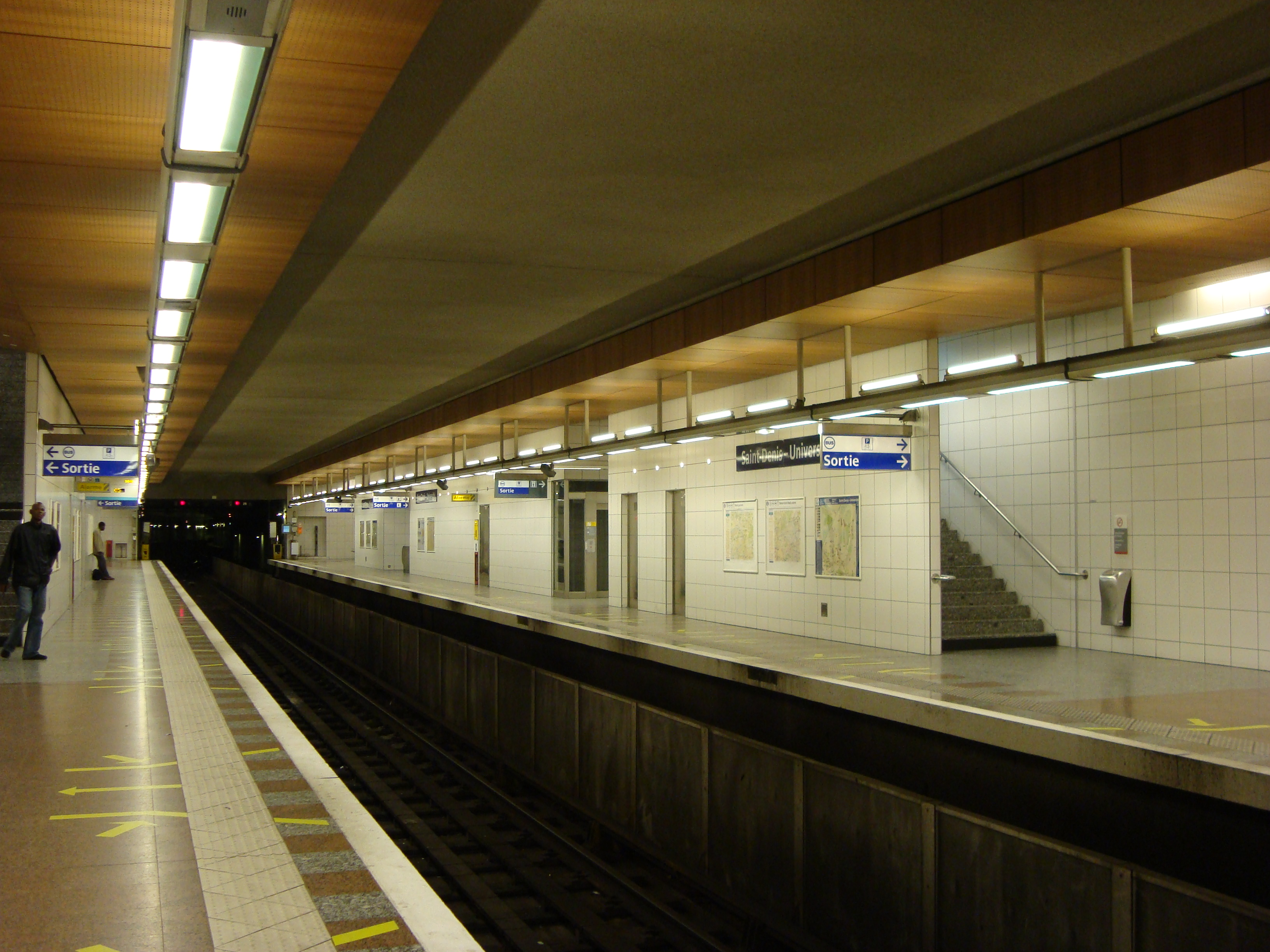
Line 13 platforms at Saint-Denis–Université
