= List of things named after Louis Pasteur =

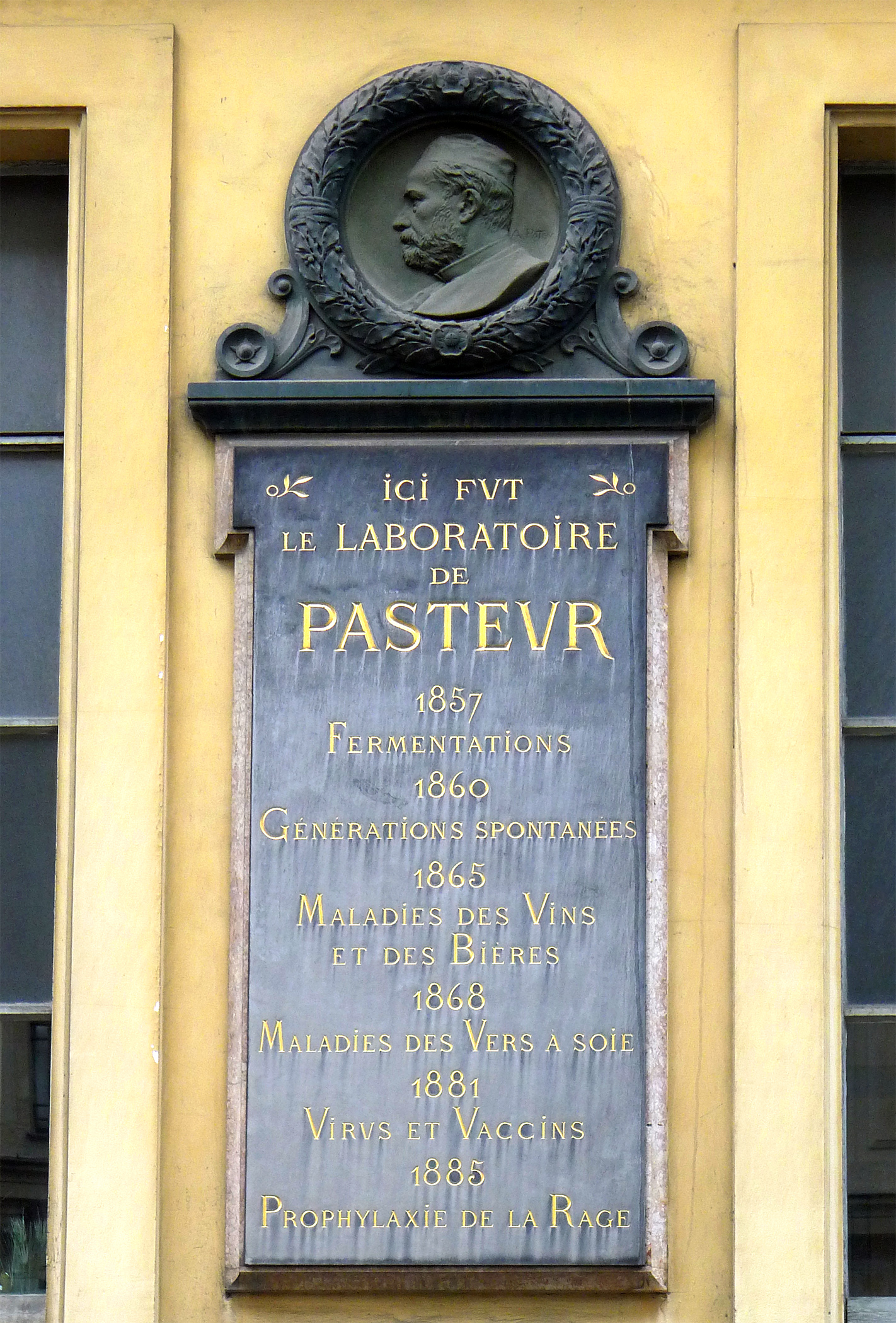
Commemorative plaque of Louis Pasteur's work (École normale supérieure, Paris).

This article is a list of things named after the French scientist Louis Pasteur (1822-1895).

== Science ==
- Pasteurization
- Pasteur effect
- Pasteur point
- Pasteur pipette
- Pasteur–Chamberland filter

== Institut Pasteur ==
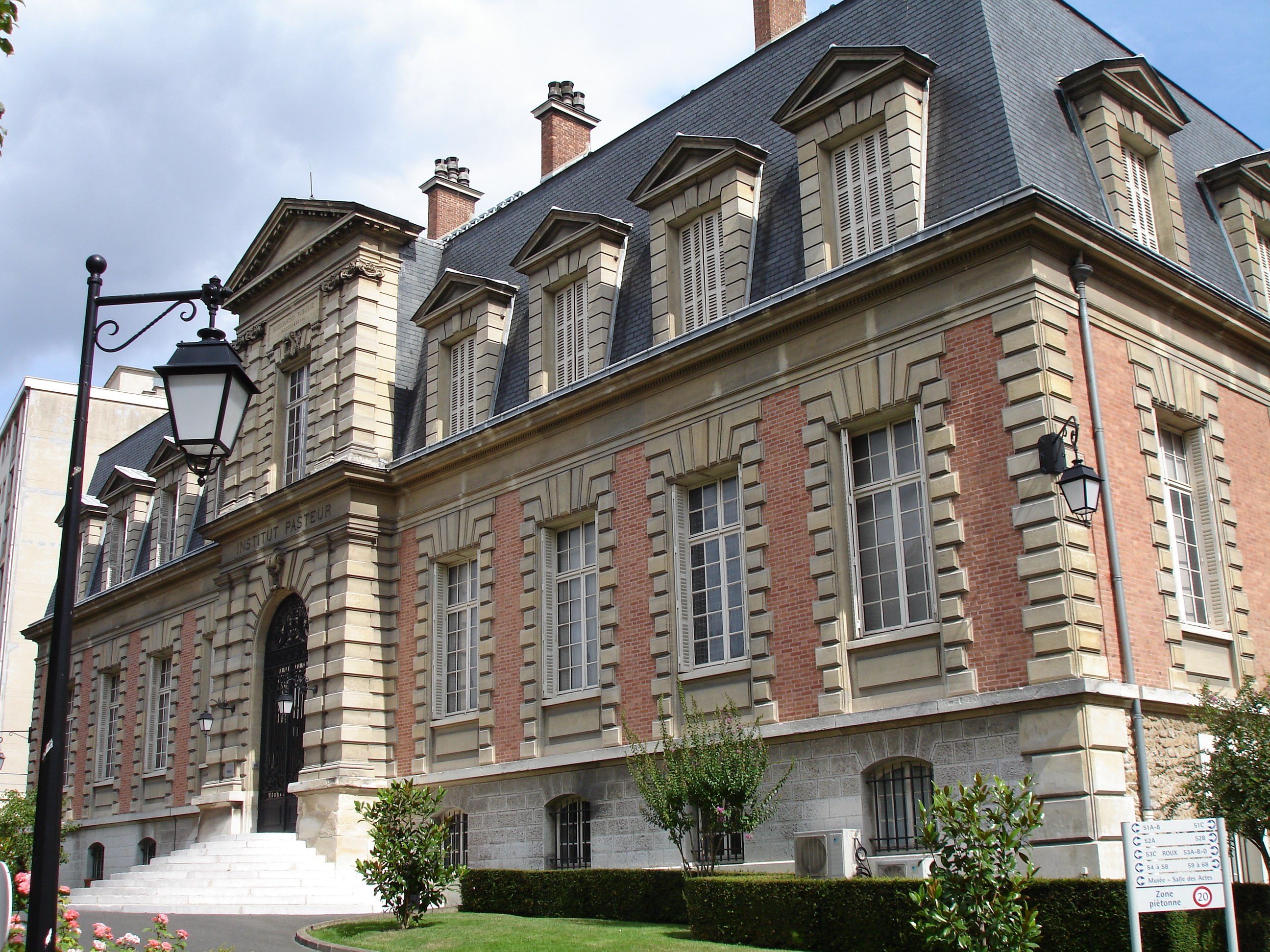
Historical building of the Institut Pasteur in Paris.

- Institut Pasteur
  - Institut Pasteur in Ho Chi Minh City (Vietnam)
  - Institut Pasteur de Dalat (Vietnam)
  - Institut Pasteur Korea
  - Pasteur Institute of Lille (France)
  - Pasteur Institute of Iran
  - Pasteur Institute of Algiers (Algeria)
  - UNESCO/Institut Pasteur Medal
- Musée Pasteur

== Others ==
=== Astronomical features ===
- Pasteur (lunar crater)
- Pasteur (Martian crater)
- 4804 Pasteur, asteroid

=== Educational ===
==== Elementary schools ====
- Louis Pasteur Elementary School in Detroit, Michigan (United States)
- Louis Pasteur Elementary School in Chicago, Illinois (United States)

==== High schools ====
- Lycée Pasteur in Neuilly-sur-Seine (France)
- Lycée Pasteur de São Paulo (Brazil)
- Lycée français Louis-Pasteur de Bogotá (Colombia)
- Lycée Français Louis Pasteur de Lagos (Nigeria)
- Lycée Louis Pasteur in Calgary (Canada)

==== Universities ====
- Louis Pasteur University, Strasbourg (France)
- Louis Pasteur University Hospital in Košice (Slovakia)

=== Hospitals ===
- Centre hospitalier Louis Pasteur, Dole (France).
- Louis Pasteur Private Hospital in Pretoria (South Africa).
- Life Louis Pasteur Private Hospital, Bloemfontein (South Africa).

=== Stations ===
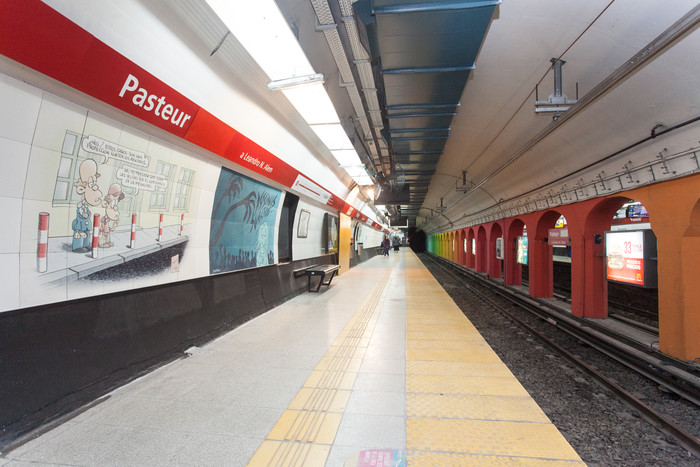
The station Pasteur - AMIA of the metro of Buenos Aires (Argentina).

- Pasteur (Milan Metro) (Italy)
- Pasteur station (Paris Metro) (France)
- Pasteur - AMIA (Buenos Aires Underground) (Argentina)

=== Streets ===
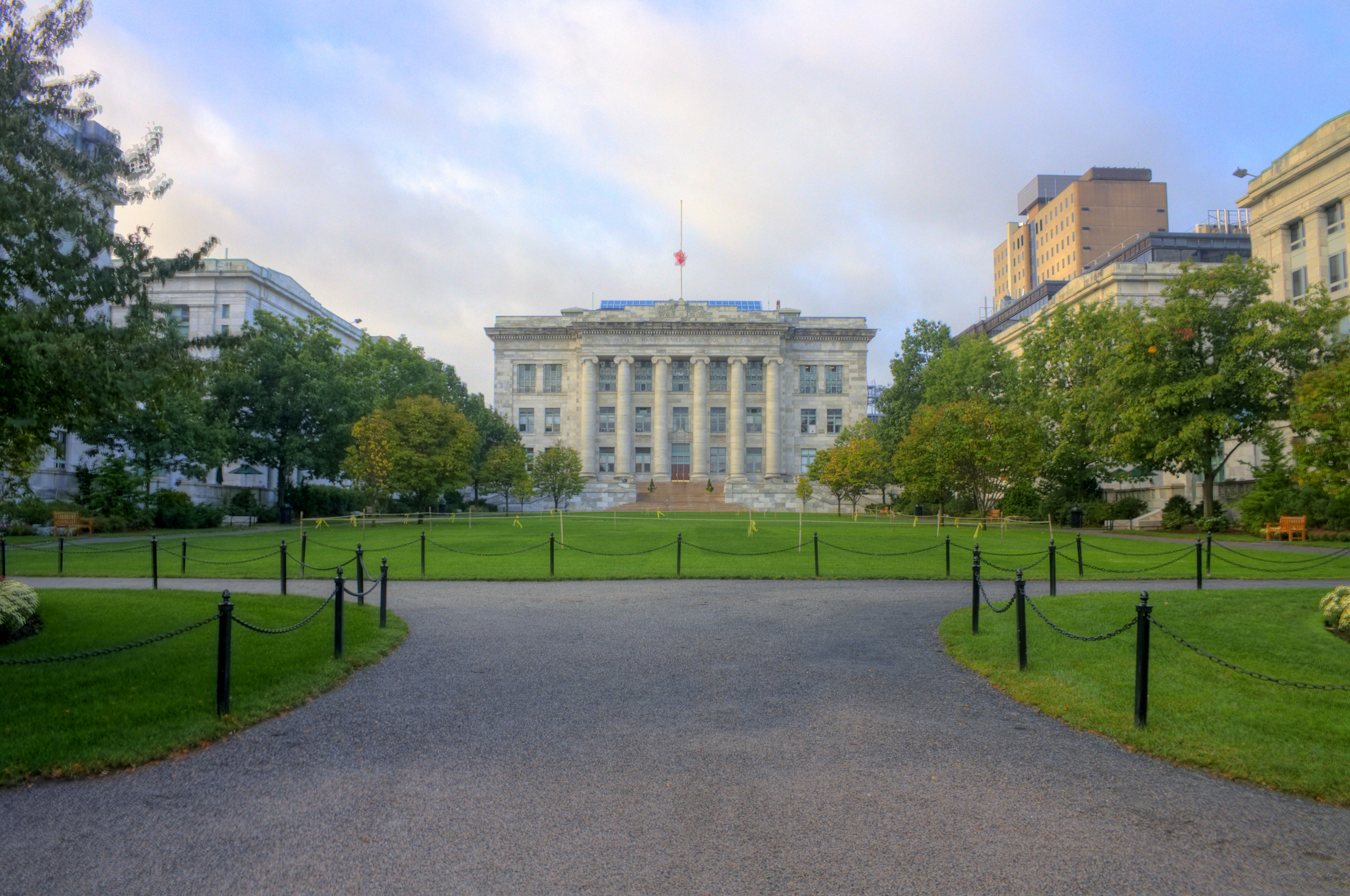
Harvard Medical School quadrangle, facing the Avenue Louis Pasteur.

==== France ====
In France, there are about 2,020 streets named after Louis Pasteur

- Avenue Pasteur, Arbois
- Avenue Pasteur, Dole

==== Vietnam ====
- Avenue Pasteur, Ho Chi Minh City (one of the few streets in that city to retain its French name)

==== United States ====
- Avenue Louis Pasteur in Boston's Longwood Medical and Academic Area

==== Iran ====
Pasteur Street is an important street in Tehran, Iran in which key government institutions are located. It is highly secured because of the presence of key institutions such as the office of the Iranian President, the center of Iran's Revolutionary Guards Intelligence leadership, the center of the Assembly of Experts, and the Supreme National Security Council. Also Several military schools, the center of the Armed Forces Logistics and Center for Strategic Studies are located in the street

==== Canada ====
- Louis-Pasteur Private on the campus of the University of Ottawa

==== Indonesia ====
- Pasteur street and Pasteur village in Bandung

==== Poland ====
- Pasteur street (pol. ulica Ludwika Pasteura) in Kraków

=== Other locations ===
- Pasteur Island
- Pasteur Peninsula
- Mount Pasteur in New Zealand's Paparoa Range was named after him in 1970 by the Department of Scientific and Industrial Research.

== See also ==
- Liebig–Pasteur dispute
- Koch–Pasteur rivalry
- Pasteur's portrait by Edelfelt
- The Story of Louis Pasteur
- Sanofi Pasteur
- Pasteur (disambiguation)
