= Pasteur (disambiguation) =

Louis Pasteur (1822–1895) was a French chemist and microbiologist.

Pasteur may also refer to:

== Places ==
- Pasteur Island, an Antarctic island
- Pasteur Peninsula, an Antarctic peninsula
- Pasteur River (Quebec), a tributary of the Aux Rochers River in Quebec, Canada
- Pasteur, a tributary of the Crișul Repede in Oradea, Romania
- Pasteur Street, a street in Tehran, Iran

=== Astronomical ===
- Pasteur (lunar crater)
- Pasteur (Martian crater)
- 4804 Pasteur, a main-belt asteroid

== Stations ==
- Pasteur - AMIA (Buenos Aires Underground), Argentina
- Pasteur station (Paris Metro), France
- Pasteur (Milan Metro), Italy

== Other uses ==
- Pasteur (name)
- Pasteur (film), a 1935 French film starring Sacha Guitry
- MV Pasteur, a coaster that sank in 1971
- SS Pasteur, a French ocean liner launched in 1938
- Pasteur Institute, a French non-profit private foundation
- Pasteur Institute of Iran, a medical research institute
- Musée Pasteur, a museum in Paris, France
- Louis Pasteur University, a former university in Strasbourg, France
- Îlot Pasteur, a building in Monaco

== See also ==
- List of things named after Louis Pasteur
- Pasteur effect
- Pasteur pipette
- Pasteur point, level of oxygen
- Pasteurization
