= Lycée Pasteur =

Lycée Pasteur or Lycée Français Louis Pasteur can refer to several schools named after Louis Pasteur. They include:

In France:

- Lycée Pasteur (Neuilly-sur-Seine)
- Lycée Pasteur de Besançon (Franche-Comté)
- Lycée Pasteur de Le Blanc (Indre)
- Lycée Pasteur de Strasbourg (Bas-Rhin)

Outside of France:

- Lycée Pasteur de São Paulo
- Lycée Louis Pasteur (Calgary)
- Lycée français Louis-Pasteur de Bogotá
- Lycée Français Louis Pasteur de Lagos

== See also ==
- List of things named after Louis Pasteur
