= Translational Research Institute =

Translational Research Institute may refer to:

- Translational Research Institute at the Institut Pasteur Korea
- Translational Research Institute at the Scripps Research Institute
- Translational Research Institute (Australia) at the University of Queensland
- Translational Research Institute at the University of Arkansas for Medical Sciences
- Translational Research Institute at the Tufts Medical Center
- Joint Translational Research Institute at the Georgia Tech Research Institute
- Etc.

== See also ==
- Translational research
- American Journal of Translational Research
