= Louis Pasteur Middle School =

Louis Pasteur Middle School, named after Louis Pasteur, may refer to:

- A middle school in New York City, under the New York City Department of Education.
- A middle school in the San Juan Unified School District
- A defunct junior high school in Los Angeles Unified School District, whose campus now houses Los Angeles Center for Enriched Studies

== See also ==
- List of things named after Louis Pasteur
