= Nguyễn Trọng Toàn =

Vietnamese physician and vaccinologist

- Known for: Lead investigator of EV71 vaccine Phase 3 trial
- Scientific career
- Fields: Vaccinology, infectious diseases, clinical research
- Institutions: Pasteur Institute of Ho Chi Minh City, University of Siena

Nguyễn Trọng Toàn is a Vietnamese physician and vaccinologist. He is deputy director and person in charge of the Clinical Trial Center at the Pasteur Institute of Ho Chi Minh City and principal investigator of a multicountry phase 3 trial of an inactivated enterovirus 71 (EV71) vaccine published in The Lancet in 2022.

== Education ==
Nguyễn Trọng Toàn completed training in vaccinology at the University of Siena, Italy. He is listed with a University of Siena affiliation in a 2015 paper on dengue epidemiology.

During his time in Siena, he trained under Rino Rappuoli together with fellow vaccinologists Dirga Sakti Rambe and Melvin Sanicas, as noted in the Pan-African Medical Journal.

== Career ==
Nguyễn Trọng Toàn joined the Pasteur Institute of Ho Chi Minh City, where he became deputy director of the Clinical Trial Center.

He served as principal investigator of the multinational phase 3 clinical trial of an inactivated, adjuvanted EV71 vaccine, conducted in Viet Nam and Taiwan, which demonstrated efficacy of over 96% against hand, foot and mouth disease caused by enterovirus 71. The results were published in The Lancet and registered under ClinicalTrials.gov identifier NCT03865238.

== Selected publications ==
- Nguyen TT, Chiu C-H, Lin C-Y, et al. "Efficacy, safety, and immunogenicity of an inactivated, adjuvanted enterovirus 71 vaccine in infants and children: a multiregion, double-blind, randomised, placebo-controlled, phase 3 trial." The Lancet. 399(10336):1708–1717. (2022). doi:10.1016/S0140-6736(22)00313-0.
