= Sèvres–Lecourbe station =

Metro station in Paris, France

Sèvres–Lecourbe
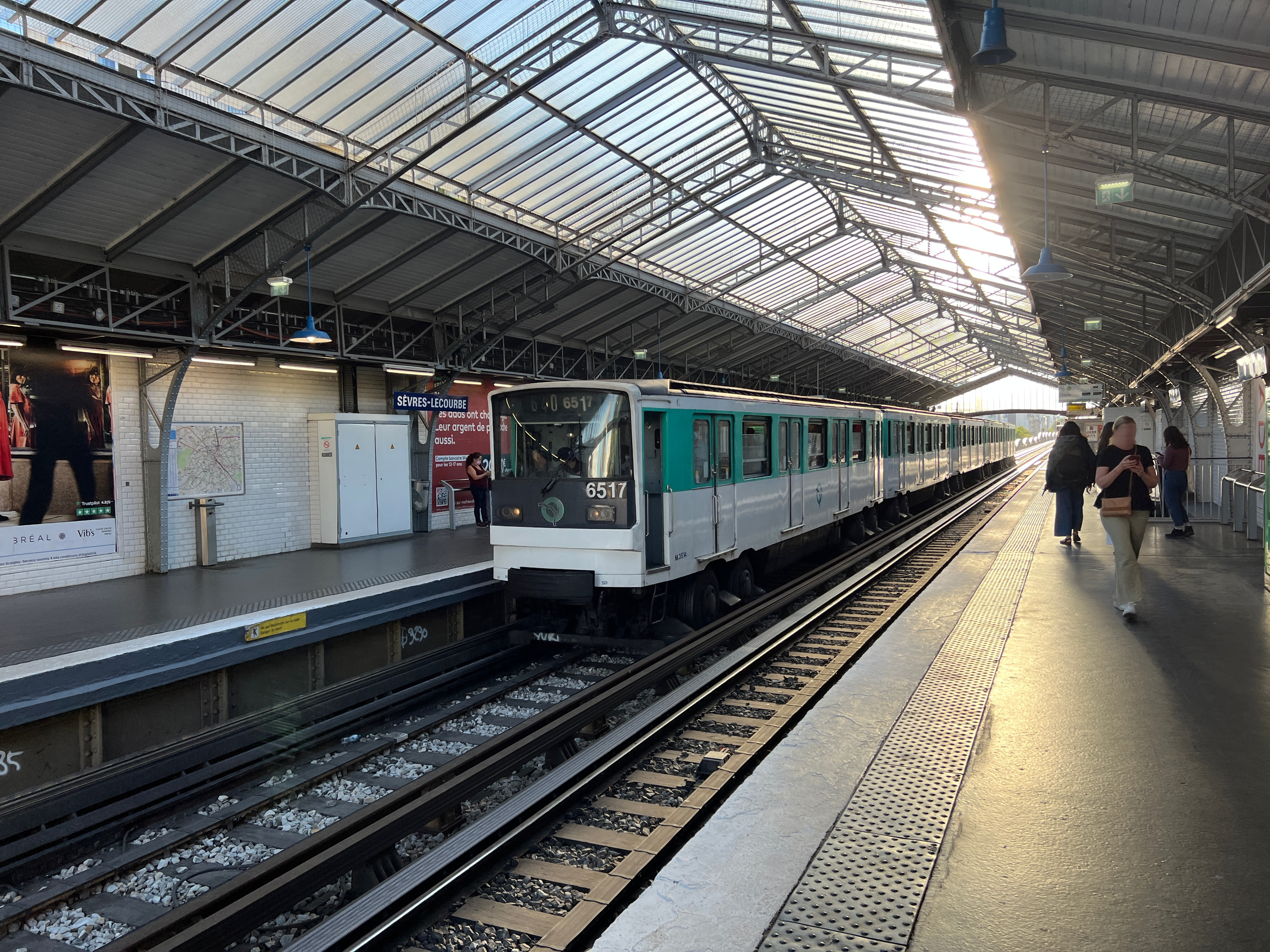

General information
- Location: 15th arrondissement of Paris; Île-de-France; France
- Coordinates: 48°50′44″N 2°18′34″E
- System: Paris Métro station
- Owner: RATP
- Operator: RATP
- Line: Paris Metro Paris Metro Line 6
- Platforms: 2 (side platforms)
- Tracks: 2

Other information
- Fare zone: 1

History
- Opened: 24 April 1906
- Former names: Suffren (1906–1907)

Services
Preceding station	Paris Metro	Following station
Cambronne towards Charles de Gaulle–Étoile	Line 6	Pasteur towards Nation
Location
- Location within Paris

Sèvres–Lecourbe (French pronunciation: [sɛvʁ(ə) ləkuʁb]) is an elevated station on Line 6 of the Paris Métro. It is located at the intersection of several streets including the Avenue de Suffren and Boulevard Garibaldi in the 15th arrondissement. It is named after two nearby streets, the Rue de Sèvres and Rue Lecourbe.

The station is one of a small number of elevated Métro stations within the city of Paris. The tracks emerge from underground nearby to the southeast after Pasteur station at the Rue de Vaugirard, remaining elevated through four more stations on the Rive Gauche, crossing the Seine on the Pont de Bir-Hakeim, then descending underground west of the Seine at Passy station. Visitors have excellent views of several notable landmarks from the latter bridge.

== Location ==
Elevated above-ground, the station overlooks Boulevard Garibaldi, west of Place Henri-Queuille (intersects with the Rue de Sèvres and Rue Lecourbe, Avenue de Breteuil and Boulevard Pasteur). Oriented approximately along a northwest/southeast axis, it is situated between Cambronne and Pasteur stations. It is also geographically close to the Ségur Métro station (to the northwest) on Line 10.

== History ==
The station opened on 24 April 1906, when the former Line 2 South was extended from Passy to Place d'Italie. The station was initially called Suffren after the nearby Avenue de Suffren, which here inauspiciously terminates after its straight-arrow run from the Seine near the Eiffel Tower. The Avenue was named after Admiral Pierre André Suffren (1729–1788), who fought the British aggressively during the many wars of his 45-year career.

When Line 2 South was incorporated into Line 5 on 14 October 1907, the station was renamed Sèvres, after the more proximate commercial street, the Rue de Sèvres, in the trace of Roman road which ran from the heart of today’s Latin Quarter to the suburban village of Sèvres.

After the opening of the Metro’s Nord-Sud line (today’s Line 12) in 1910, Lecourbe came to be attached to the station name to avoid confusion with the Nord-Sud’s Sèvres–Croix Rouge station, and it was officially renamed in 1913. Rue Lecourbe, the continuation of Rue de Sèvres in the outer arrondissements, was named after General Claude Lecourbe (1758–1815) who fought in the wars of the French Revolution and the First Empire. In 1942, the former Line 2 South was transferred from Line 5 to Line 6.

The nearby intersection of Boulevard Garibaldi with Rues Sèvres and Lecourbe was the location of the Barrière de Sèvres, one of the gates in the Wall of the Farmers-General, where taxes were collected on goods brought into the city. The Barrière was built in 1784-85 and demolished with the Wall in the early 1860s. The neighborhood to the north of the station was built on the site of the abattoirs de Grenelle, one of the five Paris slaughterhouses ordered built by Napoleon in 1810 to replace the city’s small butcheries. It was demolished in 1899.

== Passenger services ==
=== Access ===
The station has a single entrance called Boulevard Garibaldi, leading to the central median-strip of this boulevard, to the right of no. 94. It opens onto a common area under the viaduct from where access to the platform is by means of stairs or escalators.

=== Station layout ===
Platform level	Side platform, doors will open on the right
Platform level	toward Charles de Gaulle–Étoile	← toward Charles de Gaulle–Étoile (Cambronne)
Platform level	toward Nation	toward Nation (Pasteur) →
Platform level	Side platform, doors will open on the right

1F	Mezzanine for platform connection

Street Level

=== Platforms ===
Sèvres-Lecourbe is an elevated metro station of standard configuration. It has two platforms separated by metro tracks, all covered by a glass roof marquee in the style of the stations of the time. The vertical walls are covered on the inside with white ceramic tiles and bricks with geometric patterns on the outside. The advertising frames are white ceramic and the name of the station is written in capital letters on enamelled plates attached to the metal frame. The Motte style seats are red. The lighting is semi-direct, projected onto the ground by blue ceiling lights, on the walls by partially concealed tubes and on the framework by projectors of blue light. Access is via the eastern end.

=== Bus connections ===
The station is served by Lines 39, 70 and 89 of the RATP Bus Network and, at night, by Lines N12, N13, N61, N62 and N121 of the Noctilien network.

== In popular culture ==
In The Bourne Ultimatum by Paul Greengrass (2007), a scene shows Martin Kreutz (played by Daniel Brühl) coming out of the station.

== Nearby ==
Nearby are the Lycée Buffon and the Necker-Enfants Malades Hospital, the oldest pediatric hospital in the world.

== Gallery ==
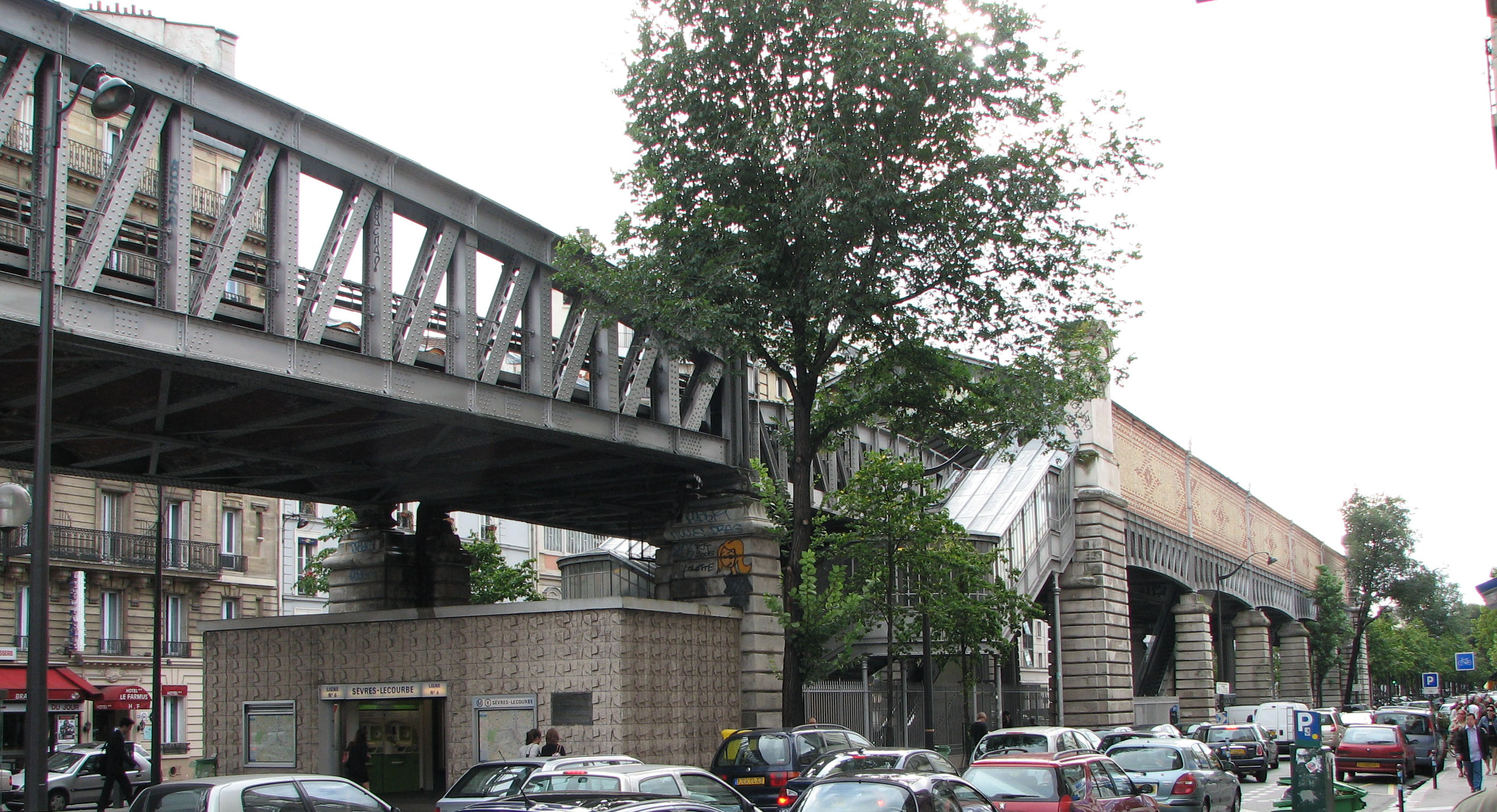
Sèvres-Lecourbe station exterior

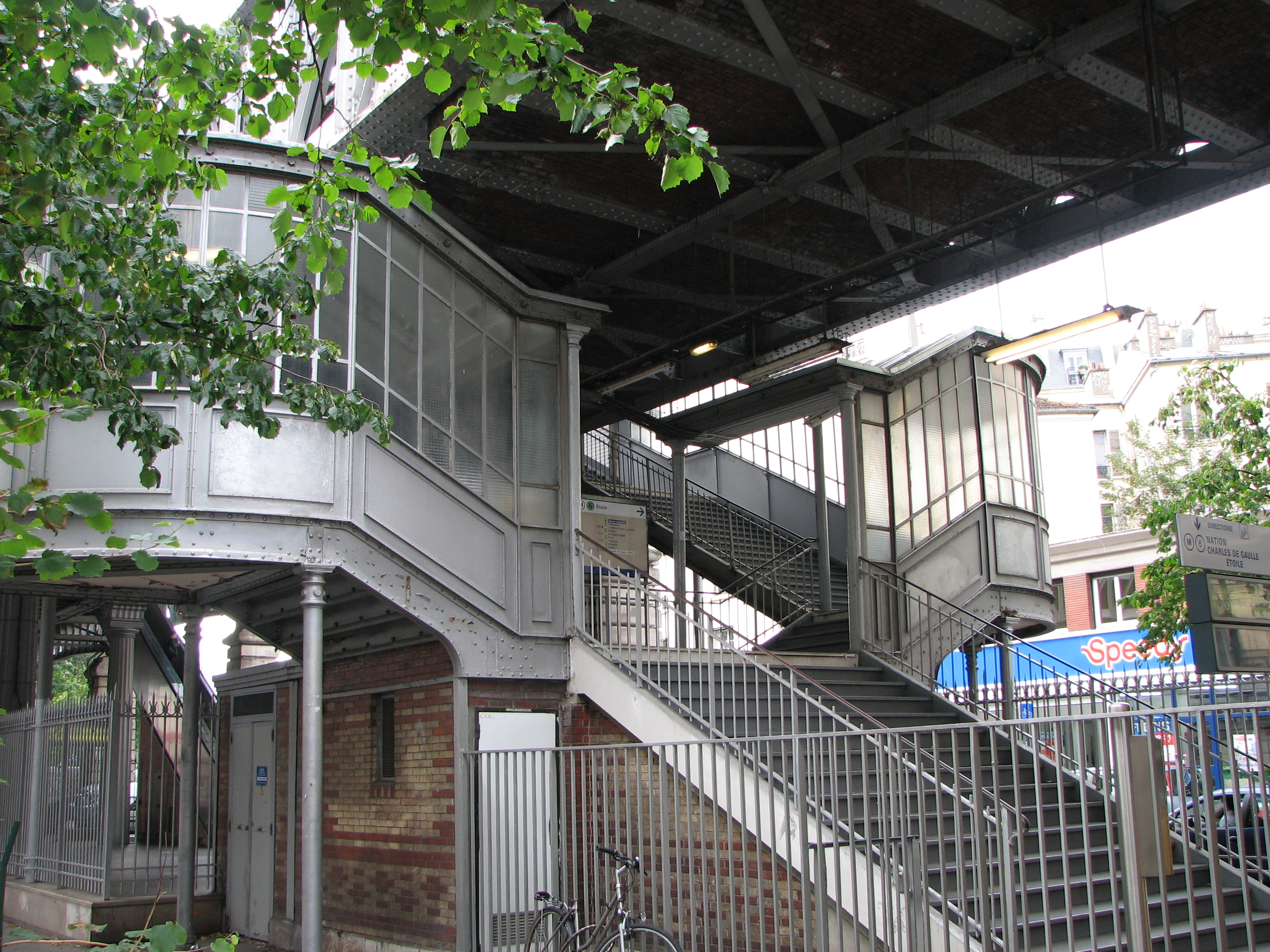
Sèvres-Lecourbe station entrance

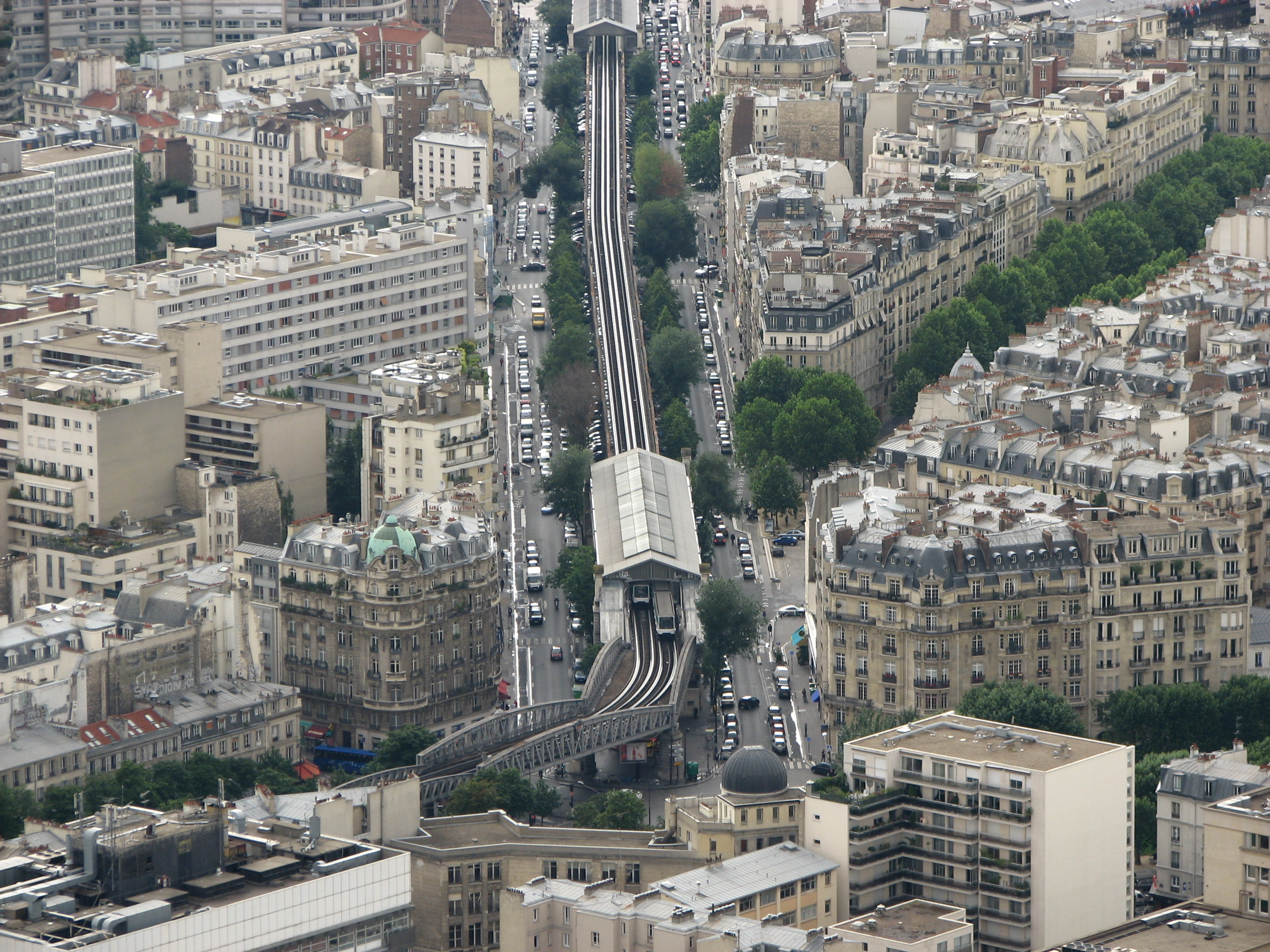
Sèvres-Lecourbe station elevated view with Cambronne station in the background
