= Pasteur (name) =

Pasteur is both a surname and a given name. Notable people with the name include:

Surname:

- Cheryl Pasteur, African-American politician
- Louis Pasteur (1822–1895), French chemist and microbiologist
- Marie Pasteur (1826 - 1910), Louis Pasteur's wife
- Simon Pasteur (born 1985), Cameroonian soccer player
- William Pasteur (1855–1943), Swiss-British physician

Given name:

- Pasteur Bizimungu (born 1950), President of Rwanda

== See also ==
- Pasteur (disambiguation)
