= Falguière station =

Metro station in Paris, France

Falguière
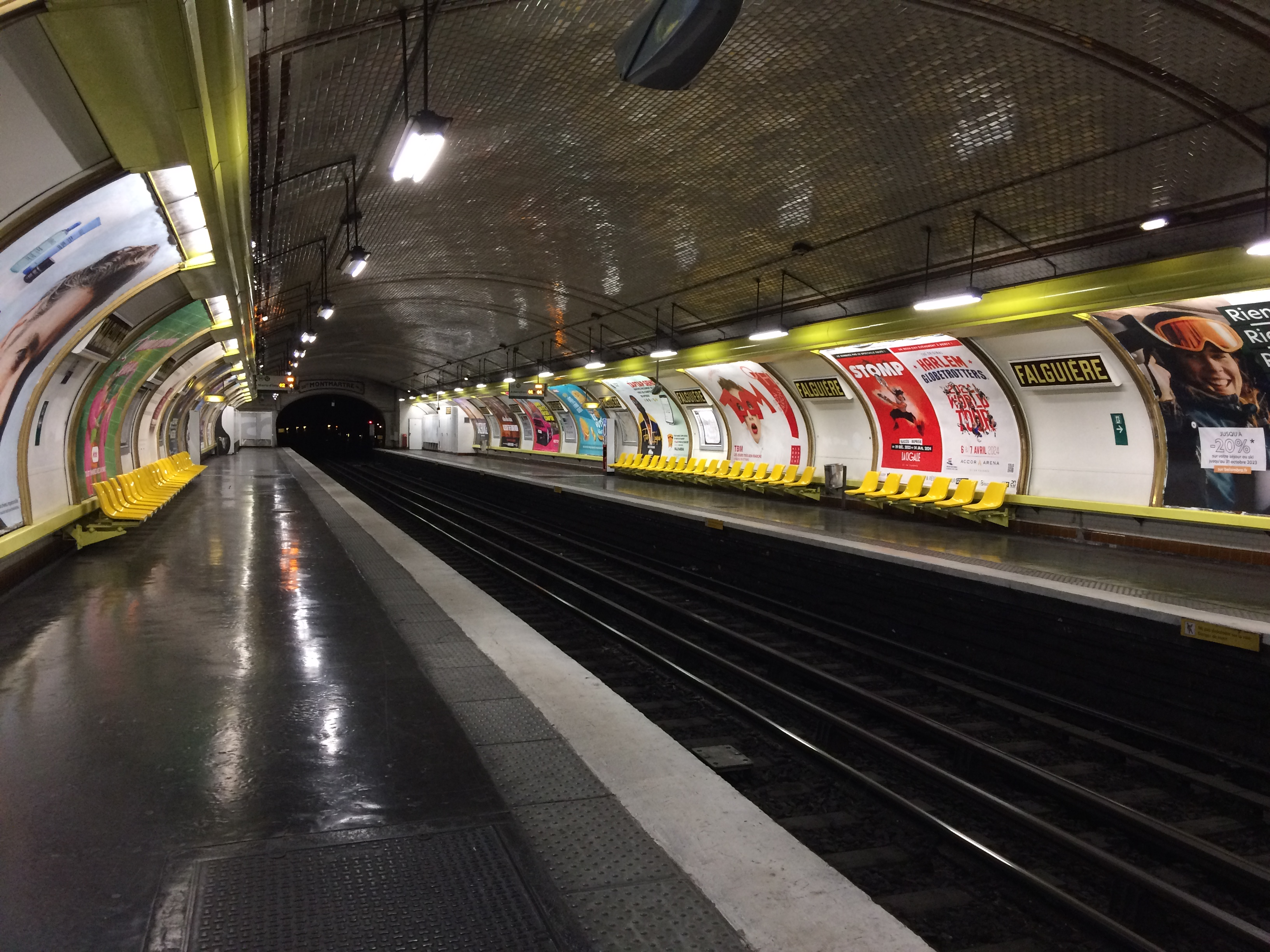
- Falguière metro station

General information
- Location: 15th arrondissement of Paris; Île-de-France; France
- Coordinates: 48°50′40″N 2°19′06″E
- System: Paris Métro station
- Owner: RATP
- Operator: RATP
- Line: Paris Metro Paris Metro Line 12
- Platforms: 2 (2 side platforms)
- Tracks: 2

Construction
- Accessible: no

Other information
- Station code: 1601
- Fare zone: 1

History
- Opened: 5 November 1910

Passengers
- 650,291 (2021)

Services
Preceding station	Paris Metro	Following station
Pasteur towards Mairie d'Issy	Line 12	Montparnasse–Bienvenüe towards Mairie d'Aubervilliers
Location
- Location within Paris

Falguière (French pronunciation: [falɡjɛʁ]) is a station on line 12 of the Paris Métro in the 15th arrondissement. It is named after the nearby rue Falguière, which in turn is named after Alexandre Falguière (1831–1890), a French sculptor and painter.

== History ==
The station opened on 5 November 1910 as part of the original section of the Nord-Sud Company's line A between Porte de Versailles and Notre-Dame-de-Lorette. On 27 March 1931, line A became line 12 when It was taken over by the Compagnie du chemin de fer métropolitain de Paris (CMP), incorporating it into the Paris Métro.

In 2019, the station was used by 881,763 passengers, making it the 293rd busiest of the Métro network out of 302 stations.

In 2020, the station was used by 479,988 passengers amidst the COVID-19 pandemic, making it the 292nd busiest of the Métro network out of 304 stations.

In 2021, the station was used by 650,291 passengers, making it the 294th busiest of the Métro network out of 304 stations.

== Passenger services ==
=== Access ===
The station has a single access at place Camille-Claudel.

=== Station layout ===
Street Level
B1	Mezzanine
Platform level	Side platform, doors will open on the right
Platform level	Southbound	← toward Mairie d'Issy (Pasteur)
Platform level	Northbound	toward Mairie d'Aubervilliers (Montparnasse – Bienvenüe) →
Platform level	Side platform, doors will open on the right

=== Platforms ===
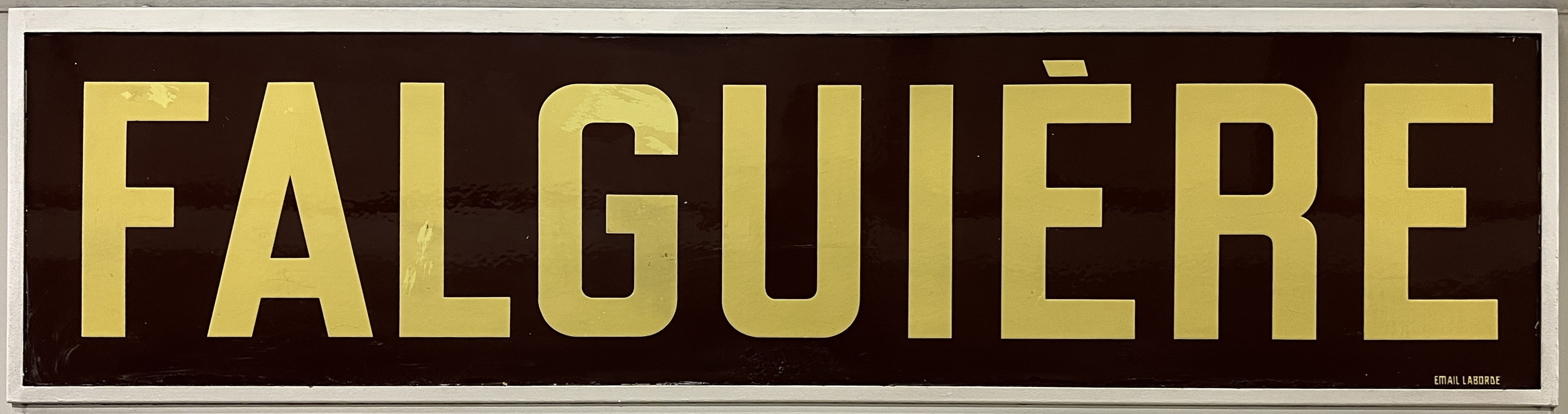
One of the nameplates at the station

The station has a standard configuration with 2 tracks surrounded by 2 side platforms. The lower portion of the side walls are vertical instead of elliptical, as are the other stations constructed by the Nord-Sud company (today on lines 12 and 13). Along with Parmentier on line 3, it is one of the last stations on the network to have the station's name to be in yellow capital letters on a black enamelled nameplate. It is incorporated into the bodywork of the station.

=== Other connections ===
The station is also served by lines 28, 82, 89, and 92 of the RATP bus network.

== Nearby ==
- L'Institut Paris Région
- Musée Bourdelle
- Necker–Enfants Malades Hospital (the first paediatric hospital in the world)

== Gallery ==
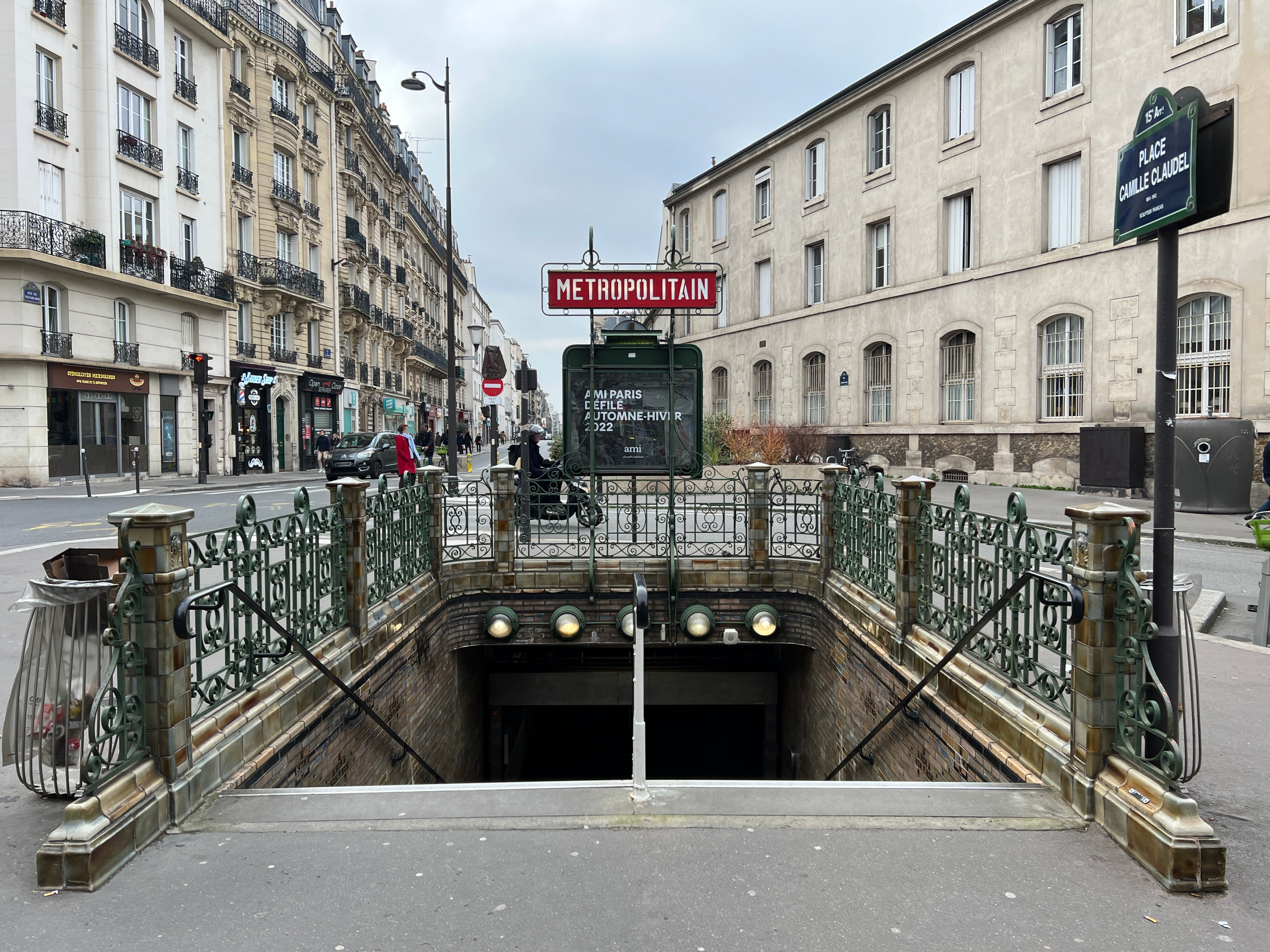
Access at place Camille-Claudel

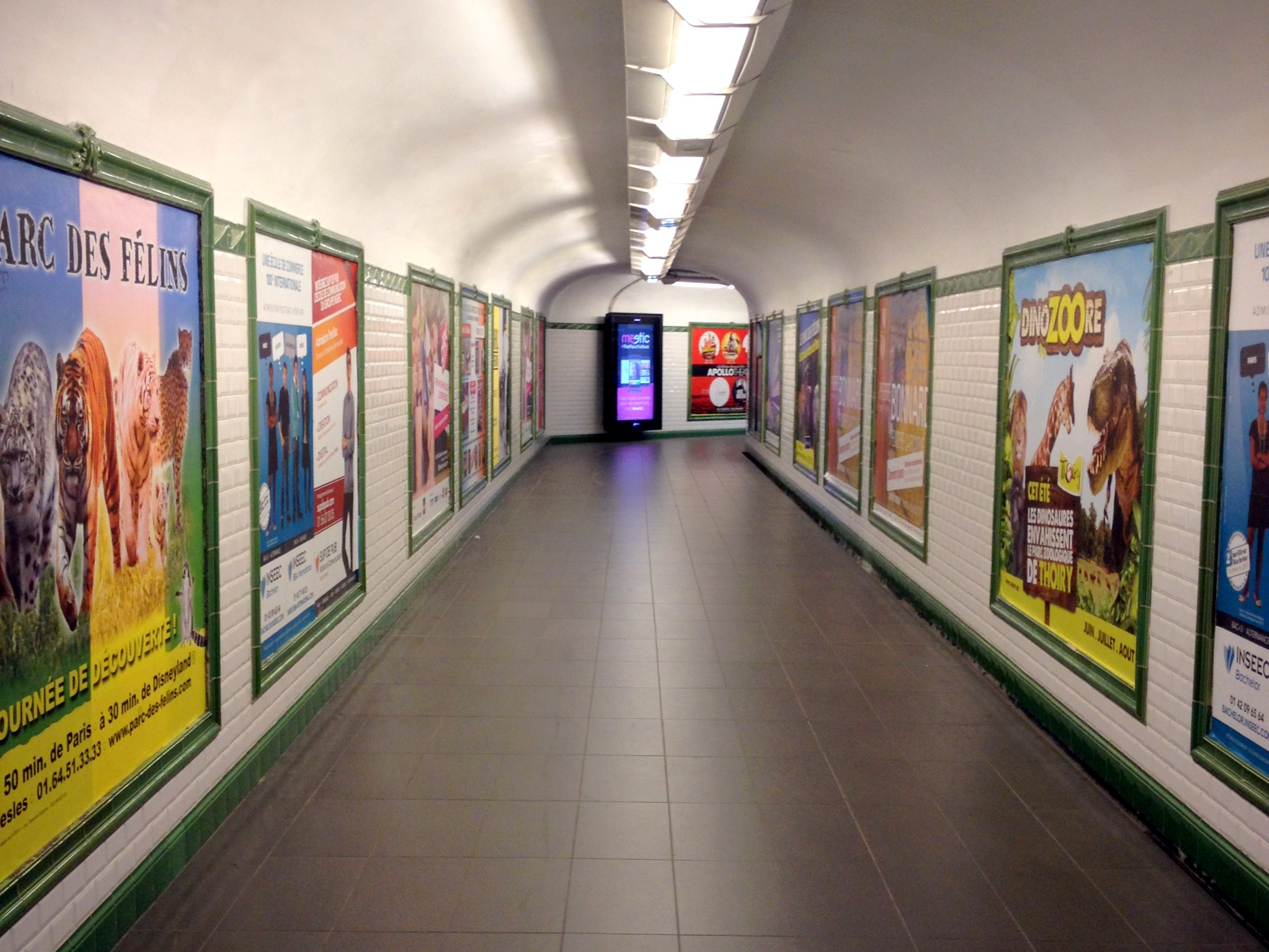
Corridors within the station

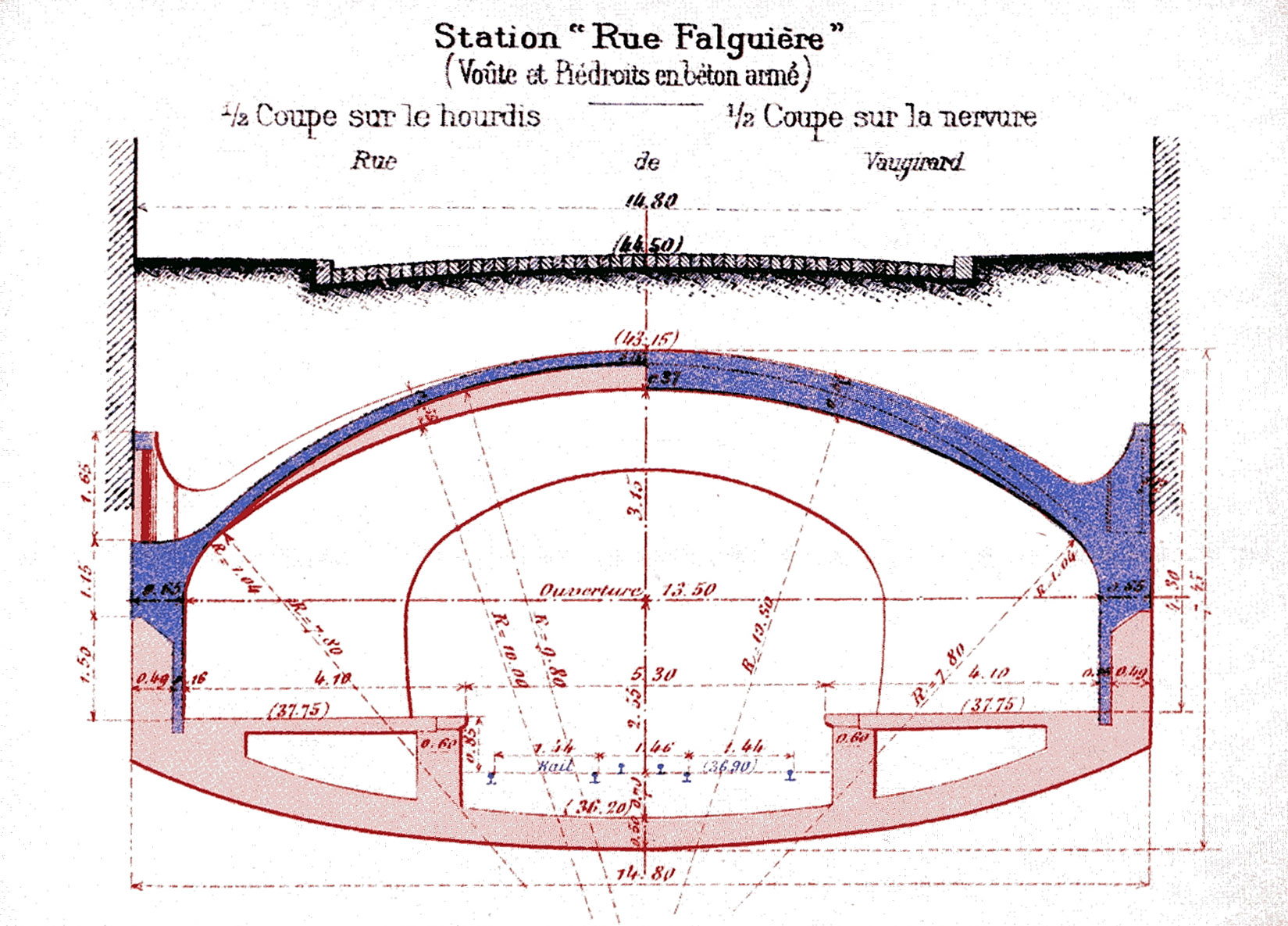
Cross section of the station

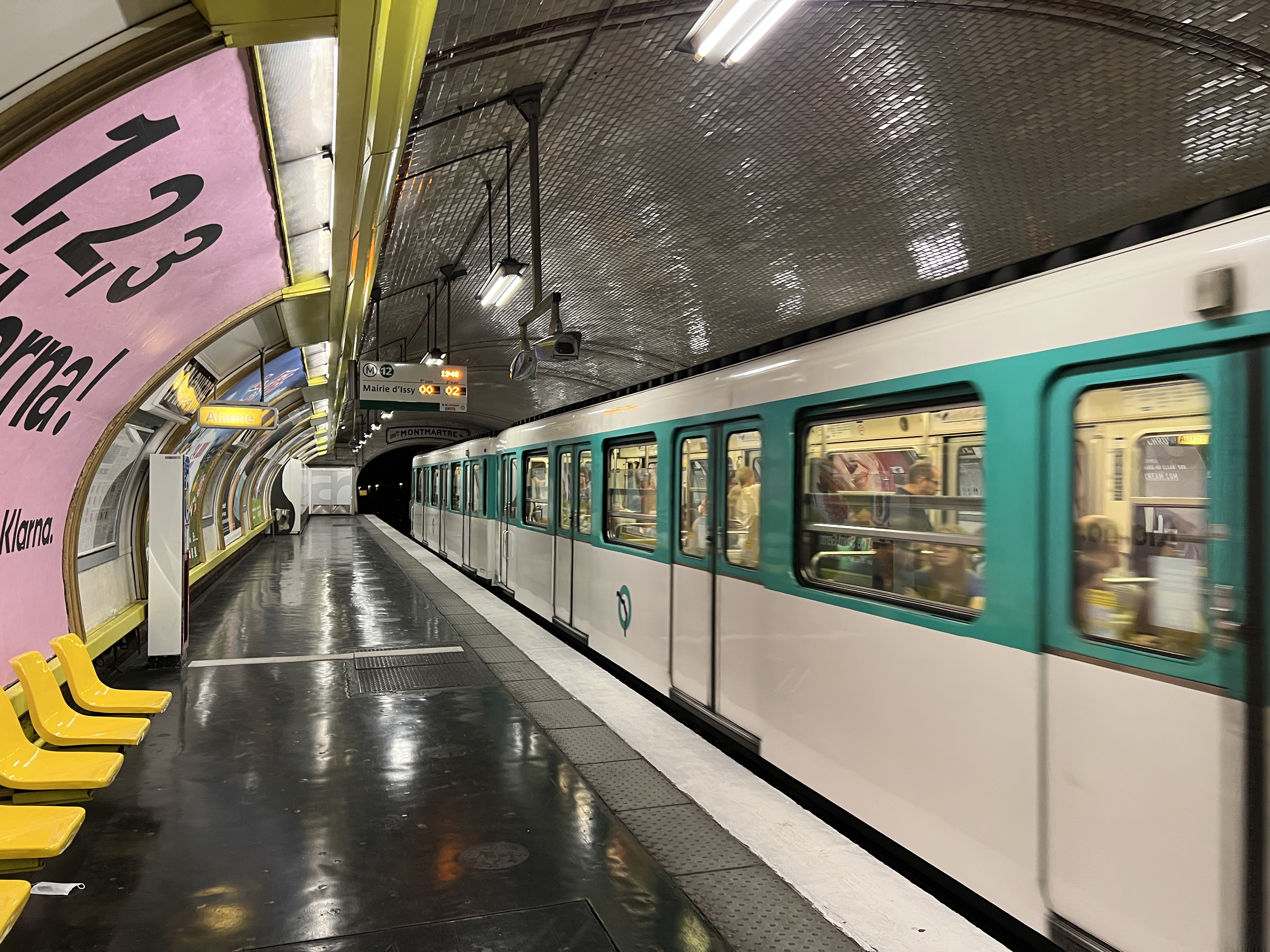
MF 67 at Falguière Station
