= Cambronne station =

Metro station in Paris, France

Cambronne
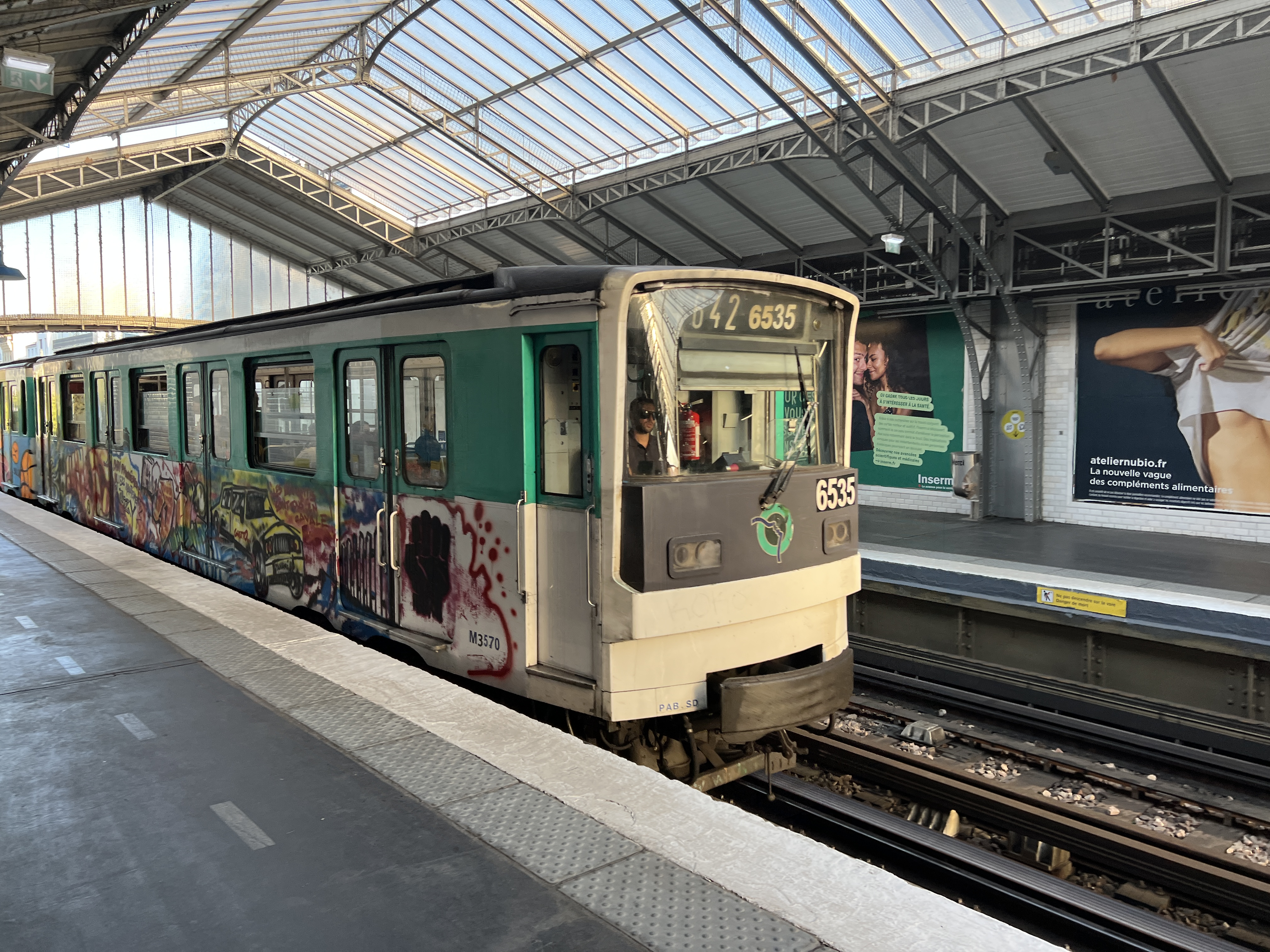
- MP 73 at Cambronne

General information
- Location: 15th arrondissement of Paris; Île-de-France; France
- Coordinates: 48°50′51″N 2°18′11″E
- System: Paris Métro station
- Owner: RATP
- Operator: RATP
- Line: Paris Metro Paris Metro Line 6
- Platforms: 2 (side platforms)
- Tracks: 2

Other information
- Station code: 0202
- Fare zone: 1

History
- Opened: 24 April 1906

Passengers
- 1,636,566 (2021)

Services
Preceding station	Paris Metro	Following station
La Motte-Picquet–Grenelle towards Charles de Gaulle–Étoile	Line 6	Sèvres–Lecourbe towards Nation
Location
- Location within Paris

Cambronne (French pronunciation: [kɑ̃bʁɔn]) is an elevated station on Line 6 of the Paris Métro. Located in the 15th arrondissement, it is named after the nearby Place Cambronne and Rue Cambronne, which were in turn named after Viscount Pierre Cambronne (1770–1842), a general at the Battle of Waterloo. The station is at the location of the former Barrière de l'École-Militaire, a gate built for the collection of taxes as part of the Wall of the Farmers-General; the gate was built between 1784 and 1788 before it was demolished prior to 1859 amid Haussmann's renovation of Paris.

== History ==
The station opened as part of the former Line 2 South on 24 April 1906 when it was extended from Passy to Place d'Italie. On 14 October 1907, Line 2 South was incorporated into Line 5. It was then temporarily absorbed by Line 6 from 17 May to 6 December 1931. It was permanently absorbed by Line 6 on 6 October 1942.

During the summer of 2014, the canopies above the tracks were renovated and as part of the "Renouveau du métro" programme by the RATP, the station was renovated on 30 June 2015.

In 2019, the station was used by 2,524,418 passengers, making it the 207th busiest of the Métro network out of 302 stations.

In 2020, the station was used by 1,567,953 passengers amidst the COVID-19 pandemic, making it the 167th busiest of the Métro network out of 304 stations.

In 2021, the station was used by 1,636,566 passengers, making it the 218th busiest of the Métro network out of 304 stations.

== Passenger services ==
=== Access ===
The station has 2 access on either side of Boulevard Garibaldi:

- Access 1: Boulevard Garibaldi Côté des numéros impairs (odd numbered)
- Access 2: Boulevard Garibaldi Côté des numéros pairs (even numbered)

=== Station layout ===
Platform level	Side platform, doors will open on the right
Platform level	toward Charles de Gaulle – Étoile	← toward Charles de Gaulle–Étoile (La Motte-Picquet–Grenelle)
Platform level	toward Nation	toward Nation (Sèvres–Lecourbe) →
Platform level	Side platform, doors will open on the right
1F	Mezzanine
Street Level

=== Platforms ===
The station is elevated and has a standard configuration with two tracks surrounded by two side platforms.

=== Other connections ===
The station is also served by line 80 of the RATP bus network, as well as at night, by lines N12 and N61 of the Noctilien network.

== Gallery ==
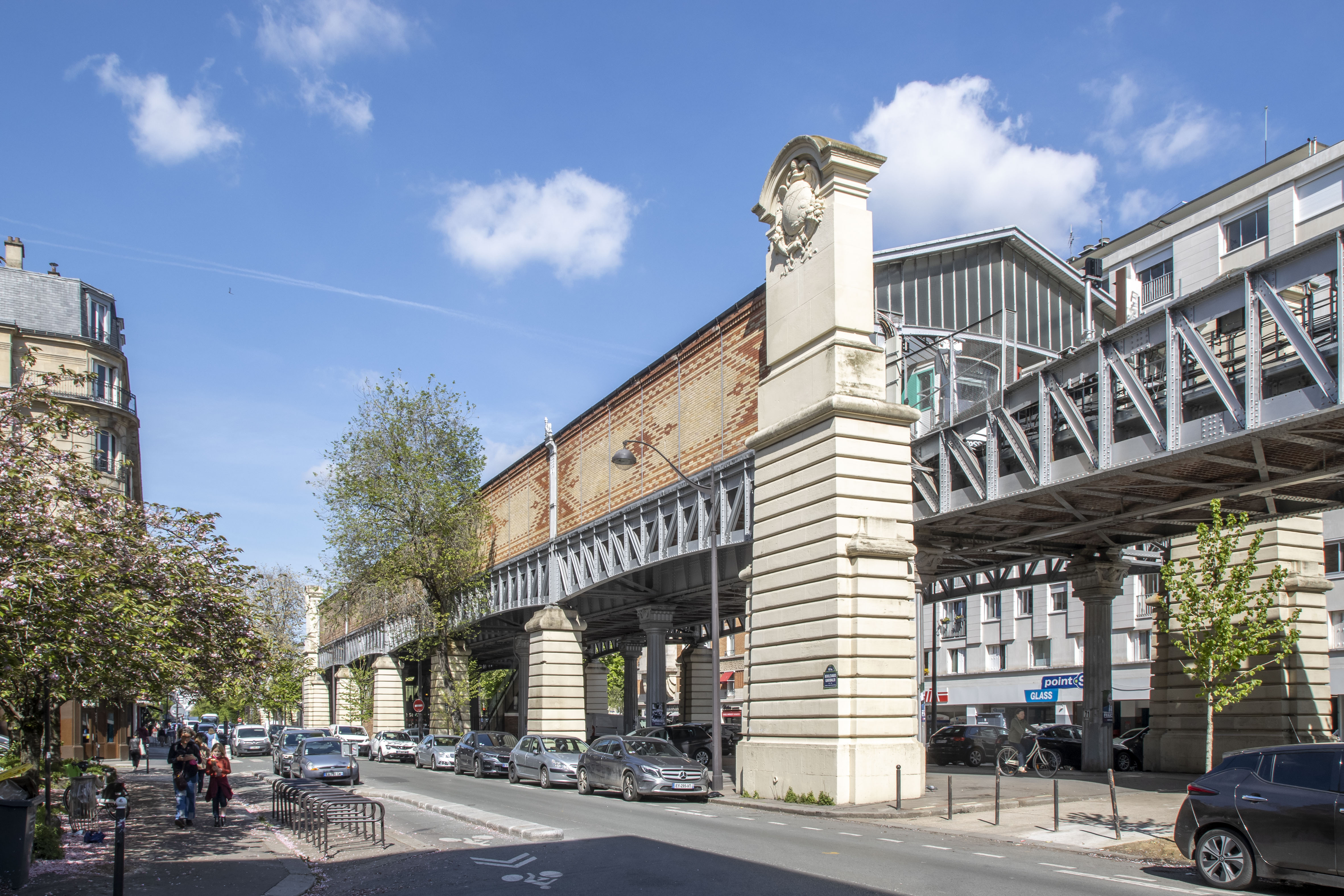
Station exterior

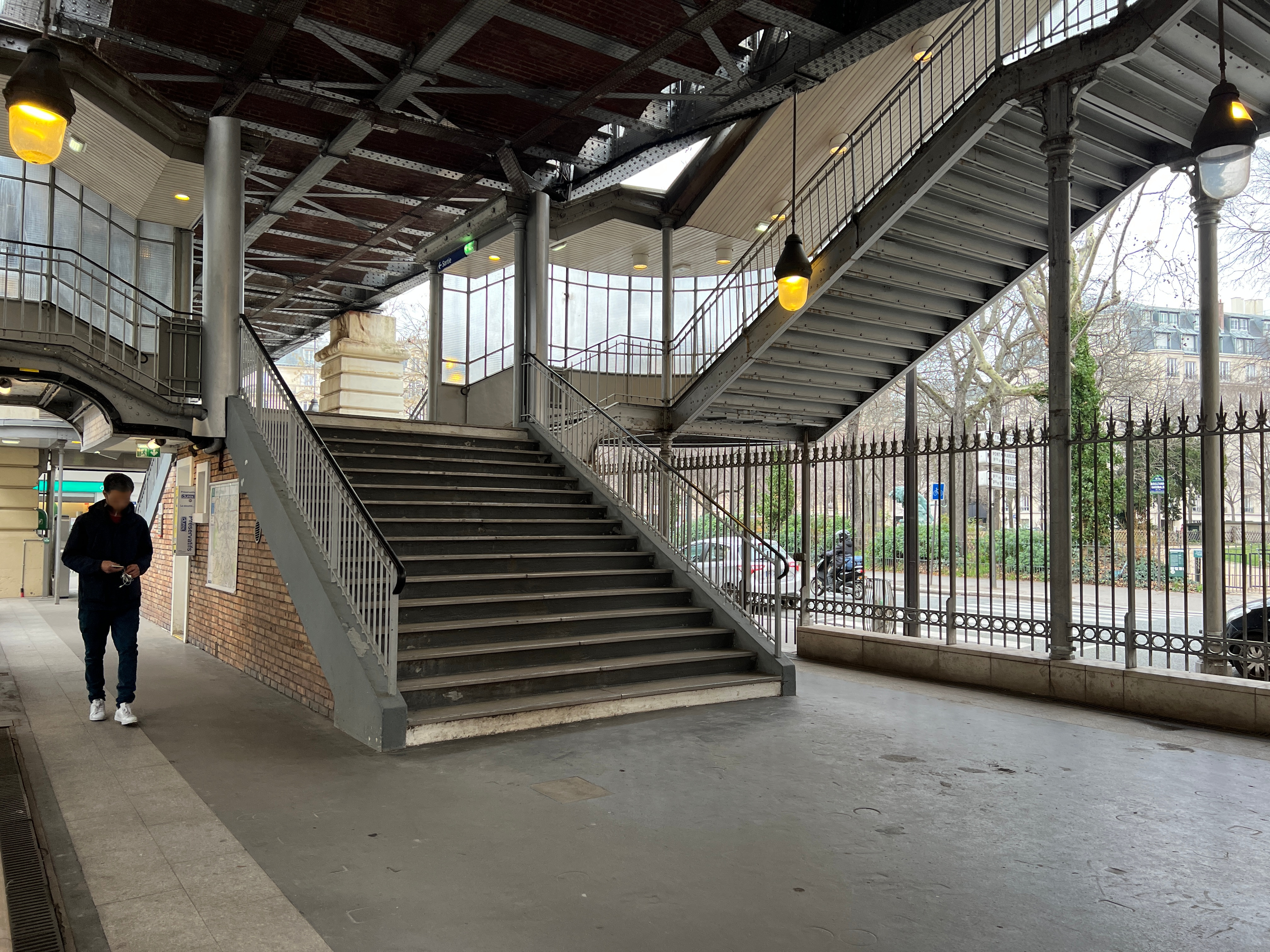
Stairs leading to the platforms

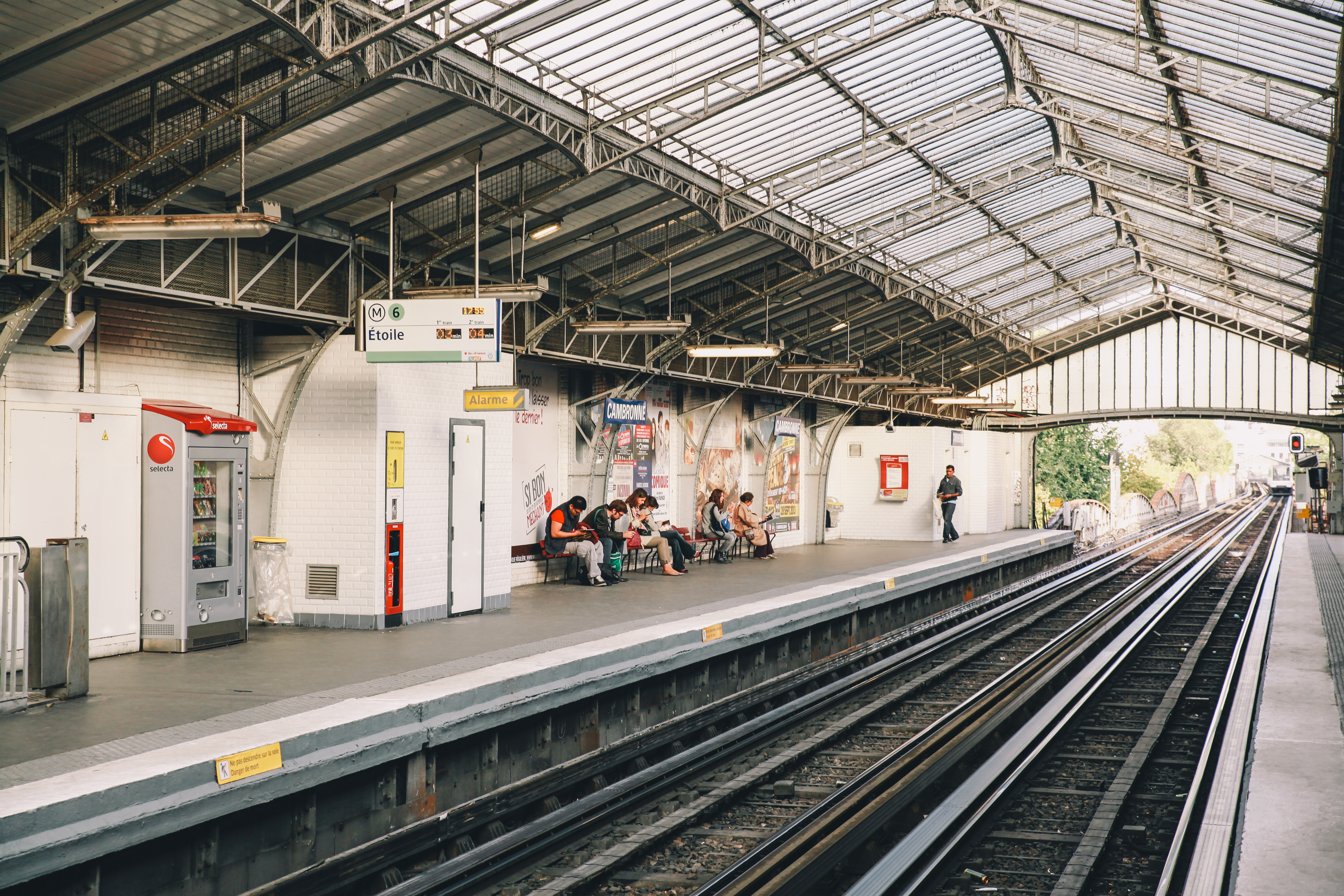
Station platforms
