= Institut Pasteur de Dalat =

Vaccine production complex in Vietnam

Coordinates: 11.9330°N 108.4272°E

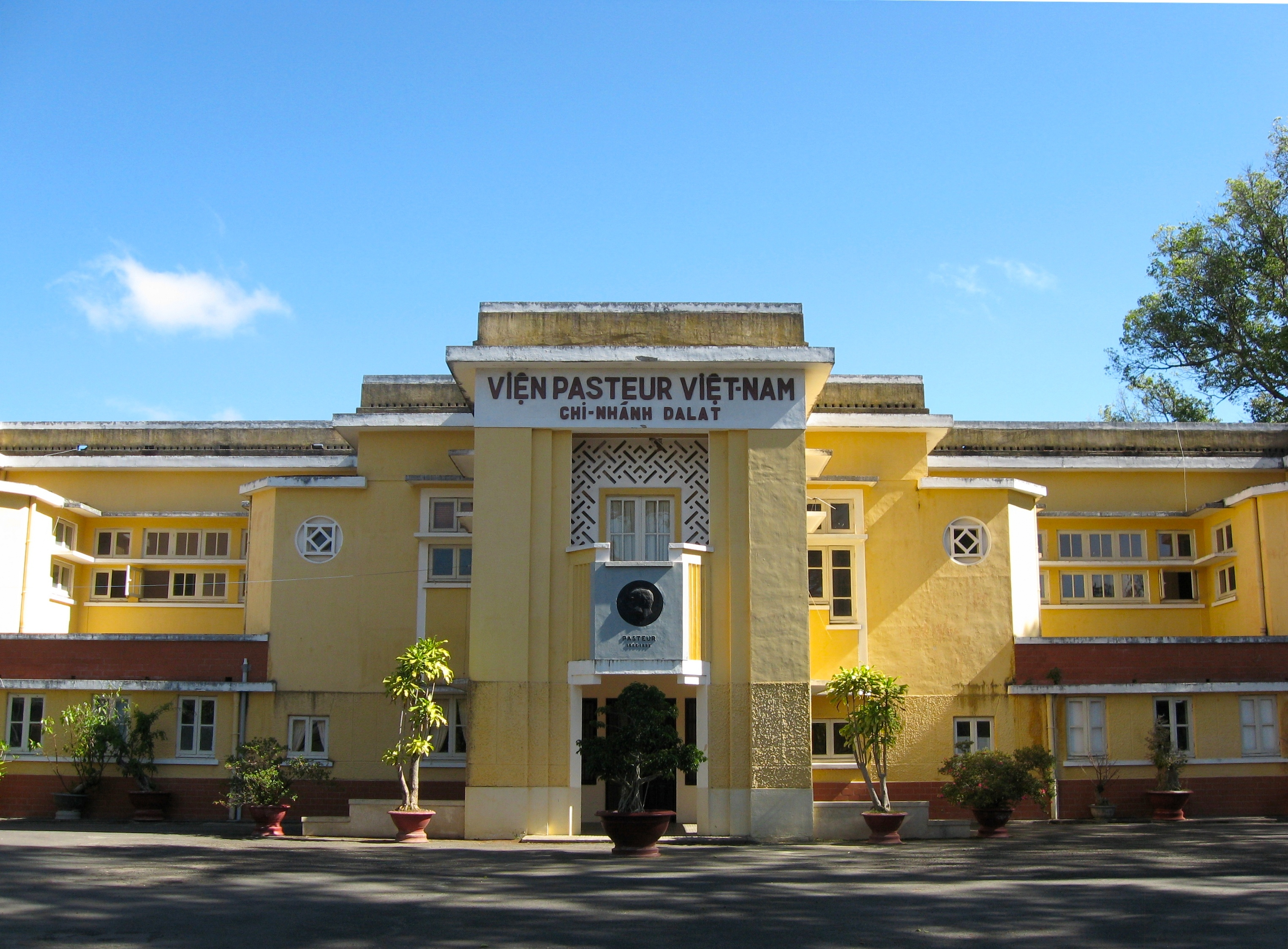
Front of the facility in 2011

The Institut Pasteur de Dalat (English Dalat Pasteur Institute, Vietnamese Công ty Vắc xin Pasteur Đà Lạt ) is a vaccine research and production complex in Da Lat, Vietnam.

The institute in Dalat was one of the many Pasteur Institutes established outside France.

== History ==
=== French period ===
The buildings were designed by the French architect Paul Veysseyre and a Vietnamese colleague.

The Institute was established and first headed by Alexandre Yersin in 1936. At that time, the Institute manufactured vaccines against different strains of smallpox and rinderpest. The Institute in Dalat was one of four established by Yersin in Vietnam; the others being in Hanoi, Saigon and Nha Trang. In a report to the Grand Council of Economic and Financial Interests and to the Governing Council in 1937, the Institute reported producing over 3 000 000 vaccines, the majority of which were anti-cholera. Also produced were anti-plague, anti-typhoid, anti-staphylococcal, anti-gonococcal, anti-colibacillairy, anti-streptococcal and anti-meningococcal vaccines, along with tetra-vaccines and various Besredka filtrates. The Institute also kept a reserve of 1 000 000 cc of anti-cholera vaccine to be used in the event of a cholera epidemic. The Institute offered medical laboratory services, including microbiological examinations, pathological examinations and biological chemistry for the local populations of Dalat and the Upper Donnai regions. Their laboratories performed 1838 medical exams that year, helping to identify cases of dysentery, diphtheria, leprosy, malaria, typhoid fever and typhus. The Institute studied endemic diphtheria among the Europeans and Annamites of the Dalat region. It was also responsible for monitoring water purification for the city of Dalat.

A report published in a French magazine in September 1952 showed the Institute was still producing vaccines against contagious human diseases, such as cholera, typhoid fever, gonorrhea, cerebrospinal meningitis, colibacillosis and pneumonia. They studied human epidemiology and microbiology, biological chemistry and the monitoring of drinking water.

A new strain of Penicillium was isolated from hepatic lesions on a bamboo rat used for experimental infections at the Institute in 1956. Penicillium marneffei was named for Hubert Marneffei, Director of the Pasteur Institute of Vietnam.

The institute was still publishing articles in French as late as 1959.

French doctors ran the Institute until the 1960s. One of the last before the Communist victory, Jean Louis Colbert, worked at the Institute in Dalat from 1962 to 1968. He was responsible for the large scale production of vaccines for human use.

=== Vietnamese period ===
The Dalat facility was taken over by the Vietnamese government in 1975. Even before the take-over, the Institute had one of the largest vaccine production facilities in Southeast Asia, shipping vaccines all over in Indochina. The institute was then run by the Ministry of Health until the south of Vietnam was fully integrated into the country in 1978, using the Institute for public health and disease prevention. In 2010, the Dalat Pasteur facility was incorporated as the Dalat Pasteur Vaccines Company Limited (DAVAC). "The company's primary mission is the production and sales of vaccines and biological products, relations with international organizations, institutes, companies at home and abroad in the fields of business, technology transfer and support, scientific research and staff training".

While now run by the Vietnamese government, the institute (along with the other Pasteur Institutes in Vietnam), seeks to establish a cooperation with the Institut Pasteur in France. One such declaration was issued in November 2010 at a conference in Haiphong, mentioning a cooperation that dates back 20 years.

== Discoveries and production ==
Working with scientists at the Pasteur Institute in Paris, scientists in Dalat discovered a new type of salmonella in 1956. The strain was called S. dalat (also and more commonly known as Salmonella ball) and was isolated from fecal matter from a gecko captured in Phanrong.

The Dalat facility has experience in producing typhoid vaccines. The facility was capable of producing 10 000 doses annually for this purpose, but production was discontinued due a lack of funding, an unsatisfactory vaccine production process and a lack of qualified staff. Since the start of production on the typhoid vaccine in 2008, the facility was not under full operation; producing only 0.3 million doses as of 2010.
