= Pasteur station (Paris Metro) =

Metro station in Paris, France

Pasteur
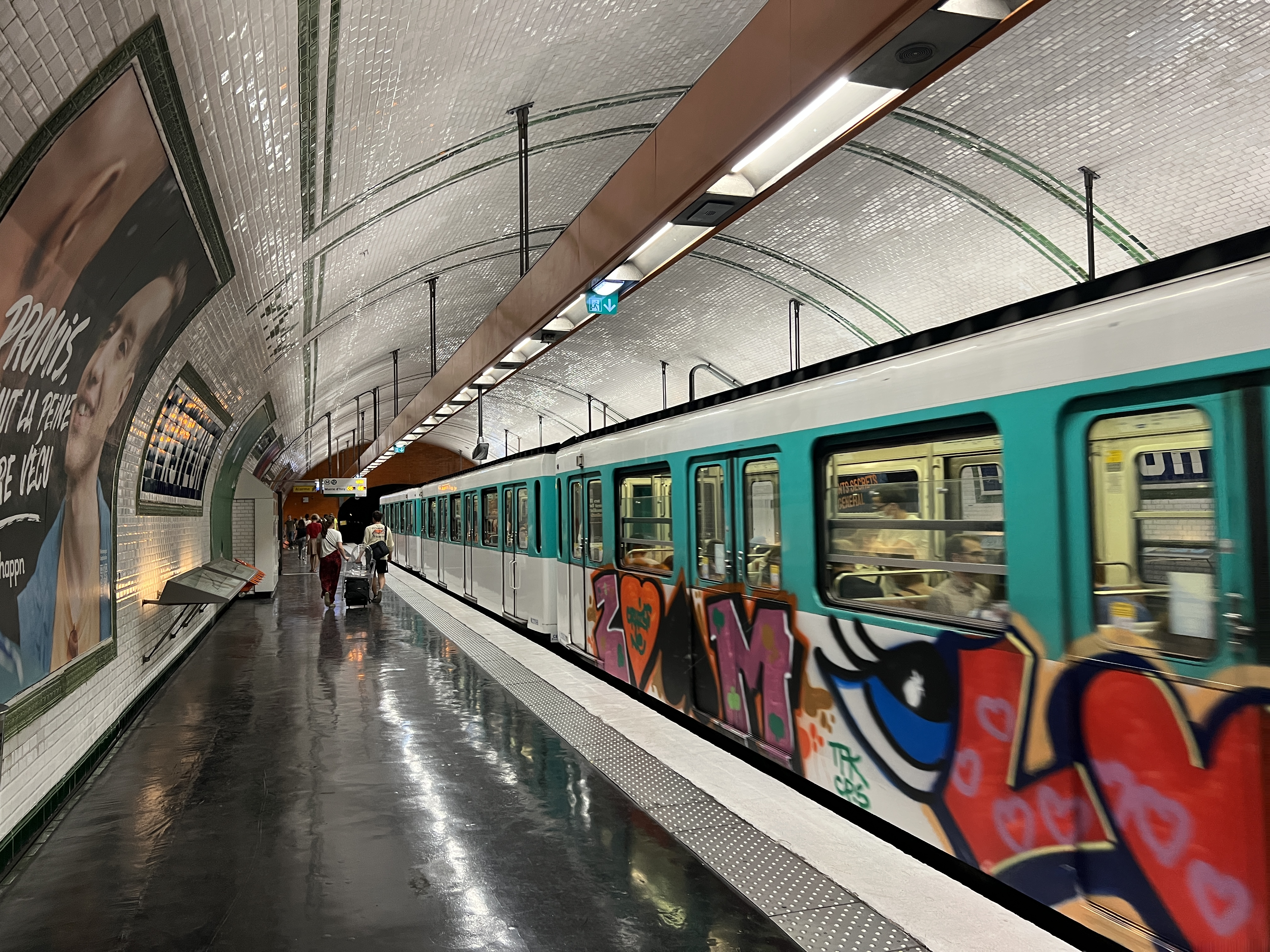
- MF 67 rolling stock at Pasteur on Line 12

General information
- Location: 15th arrondissement of Paris; Île-de-France; France
- Coordinates: 48°50′34″N 2°18′46″E
- System: Paris Métro station
- Owner: RATP
- Operator: RATP
- Line: Paris Metro Paris Metro Line 6 Paris Metro Line 12
- Platforms: 4 (side platforms)
- Tracks: 4

Construction
- Accessible: no

Other information
- Fare zone: 1

History
- Opened: 24 April 1906 (Line 6); 5 November 1910 (Line 12)

Services
Preceding station	Paris Metro	Following station
Sèvres–Lecourbe towards Charles de Gaulle–Étoile	Line 6	Montparnasse–Bienvenüe towards Nation
Volontaires towards Mairie d'Issy	Line 12	Falguière towards Mairie d'Aubervilliers
Location
- Location within Paris

Pasteur (French pronunciation: [pastœʁ]) is a station on Lines 6 and 12 of the Paris Métro in the 15th arrondissement. It is named after the French chemist Louis Pasteur. The platforms for both lines are situated underground, although Line 6 becomes elevated just after the northwest end of the station. Nearby are the Pasteur Institute (research facility) and the Lycée Buffon (school).

== Location ==
The station is located at the intersection of the Rue de Vaugirard and Boulevard Pasteur. On Line 6, the station is the first one underground on line from Charles de Gaulle–Étoile, after a long viaduct starting at Passy station.

== History ==
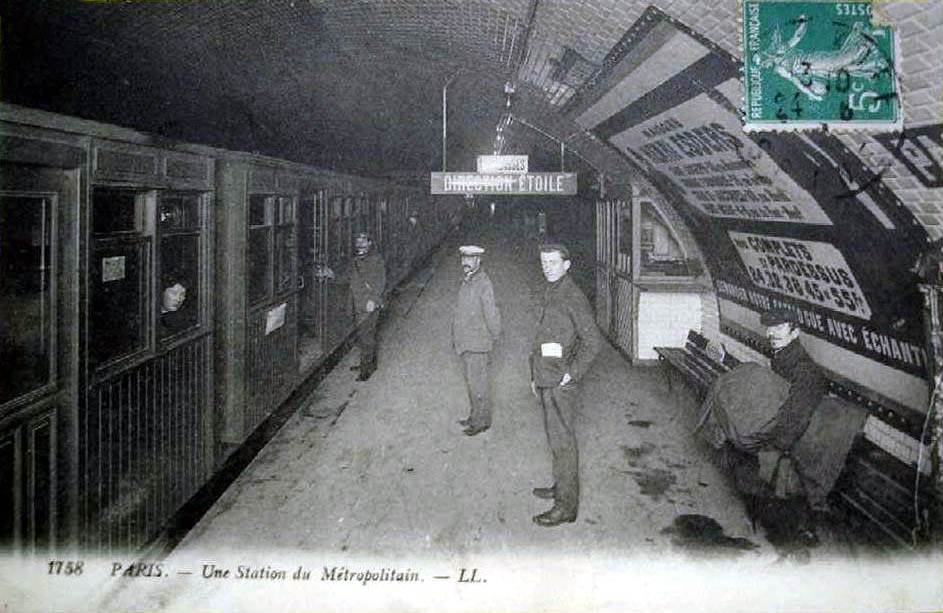
Postcard of station in about 1906

The station opened on 24 April 1906 following the extension of Line 2 Sud from Passy to Place d'Italie. On 14 October 1907 Line 2 Sud became part of Line 5. On 12 October 1942 the section of Line 5 between Étoile and Place d'Italie, including Pasteur, was rerouted from Line 5 to Line 6 in order to separate the tracks underground, as well as was elevated in certain sections (because these sections more vulnerable to air attack during World War II).

The Line 12 platforms opened on 5 November 1910 as part of the original section of the Nord-Sud Company's Line A between Porte de Versailles and Notre-Dame-de-Lorette. On 27 March 1931 Line A became Line 12 of the Paris Métro.

The station is named after Boulevard Pasteur, which is named after Louis Pasteur (1822–1895), a renowned French microbiologist and chemist.

It was the location of the Barrière de Vaugirard, a gate built for the collection of taxation as part of the Wall of the Farmers-General; the gate was built between 1784 and 1788 and demolished during the 19th century.

The station was seen in the 1998 film Alice et Martin when the character of Alice (played by Juliette Binoche) looks out the window of a train as it descends underground.

== Passenger services ==
=== Access ===
There are two entrances:

- the first, on the central median of Boulevard Pasteur, south of the Rue de Vaugirard;
- the second, on the Boulevard Pasteur, north of the Rue de Vaugirard.

The entrance of the north–south line is wrought iron, typical of this line, while the other entrance is in a Guimard style (1909, registered as a historical monument).

=== Station layout ===
Street Level

B1	Mezzanine for platform connection

Line 6 platform level	Side platform, doors will open on the right
Line 6 platform level	toward Charles de Gaulle – Étoile	← toward Charles de Gaulle–Étoile (Sèvres–Lecourbe)
Line 6 platform level	toward Nation	toward Nation (Montparnasse–Bienvenüe) →
Line 6 platform level	Side platform, doors will open on the right

Line 12 platform level	Side platform, doors will open on the right
Line 12 platform level	toward Mairie d'Issy	← toward Mairie d'Issy (Volontaires)
Line 12 platform level	toward Front Populaire	toward Mairie d'Aubervilliers (Falguière) →
Line 12 platform level	Side platform, doors will open on the right

=== Platforms ===
The main theme of this station is health, as a tribute to the nearby sites of interest. The platforms of Line 12 present research work led by Louis Pasteur. They are arranged in the Andreu-Motte orange style, with lighting strips and tunnel exits in this colour. The benches are of bevelled white tiling, unique case, and the seats are Motte white. The tiling and the north–south ceramics are however well preserved (advertising frames and frame of the station name is of a green colour, with green geometrical designs on the walls and the roof). This station, the station at Porte de Versailles (on the same line) and Porte de Clichy (on Line 13) are only three stations on the network to mix these two decorative styles.

The platforms of Line 6 are decorated in the Bruno-Gaudin style (2000 Métro revival) with bevelled white tiling, rounded white lighting strips, white ceramic advertising frames, beige Akiko seats and the station name on enamelled plate in Parisine font.

=== Bus connections ===
The station is served by lines 39, 70, 89 and 95 of the RATP bus network and, at night, by lines N13 and N62 of the Noctilien network.

== Nearby ==
- Institut d'aménagement et d'urbanisme de la région d'Île-de-France
- Pasteur Institute
- Necker-Enfants Malades Hospital
- Lycée Buffon
- Musée Pasteur

== Gallery ==
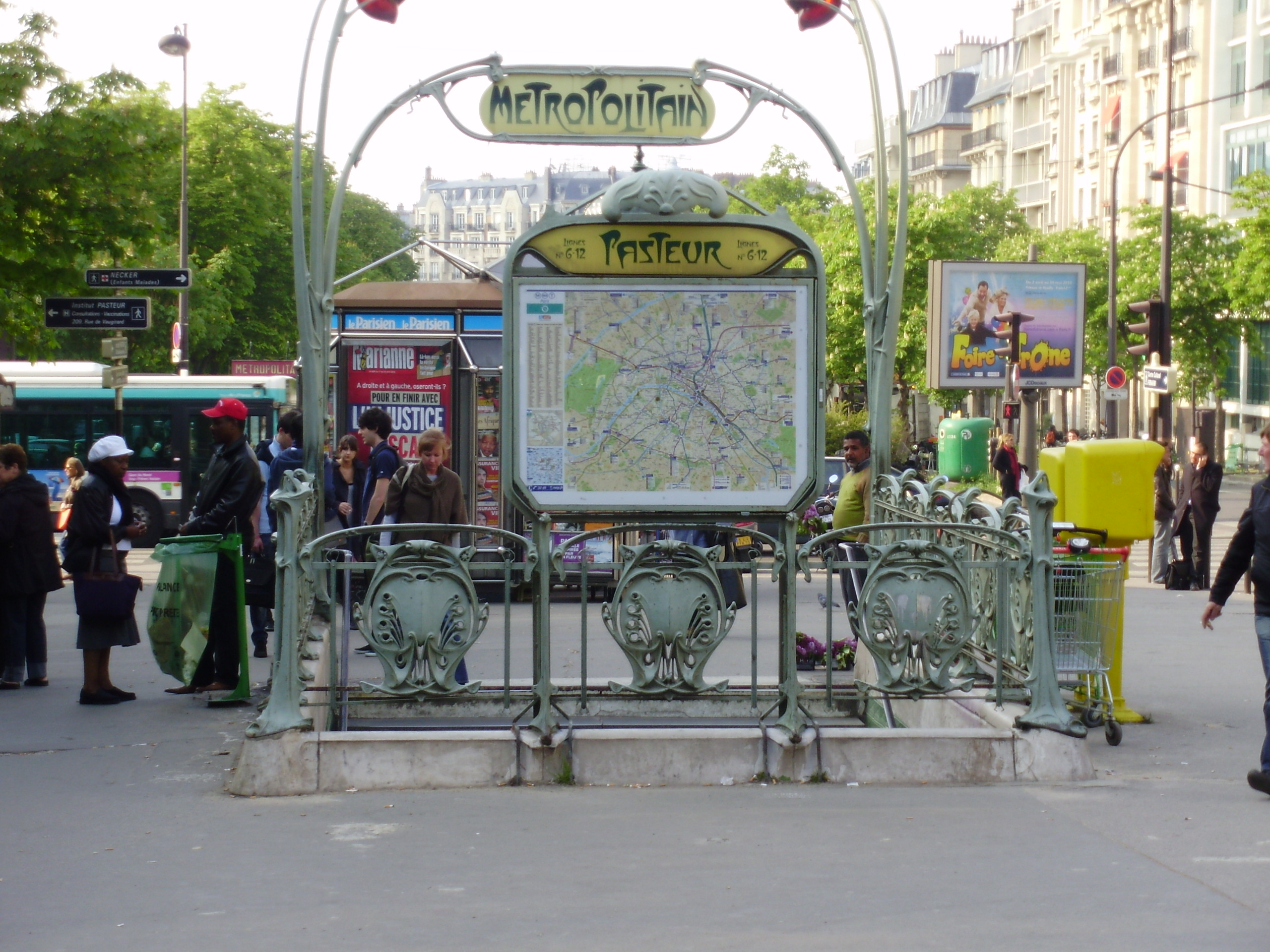
Street-level entrance at Pasteur

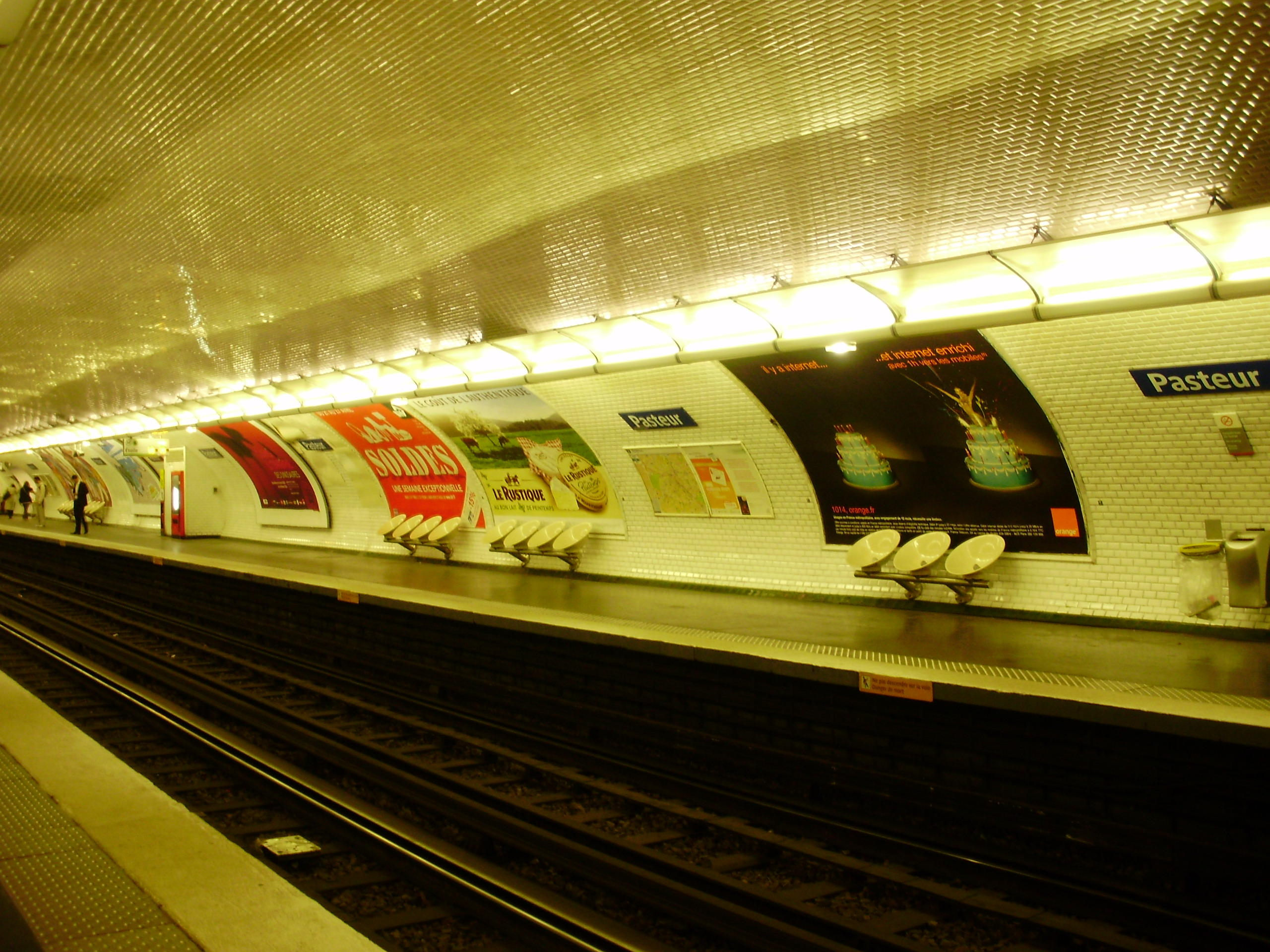
Line 6 platforms at Pasteur

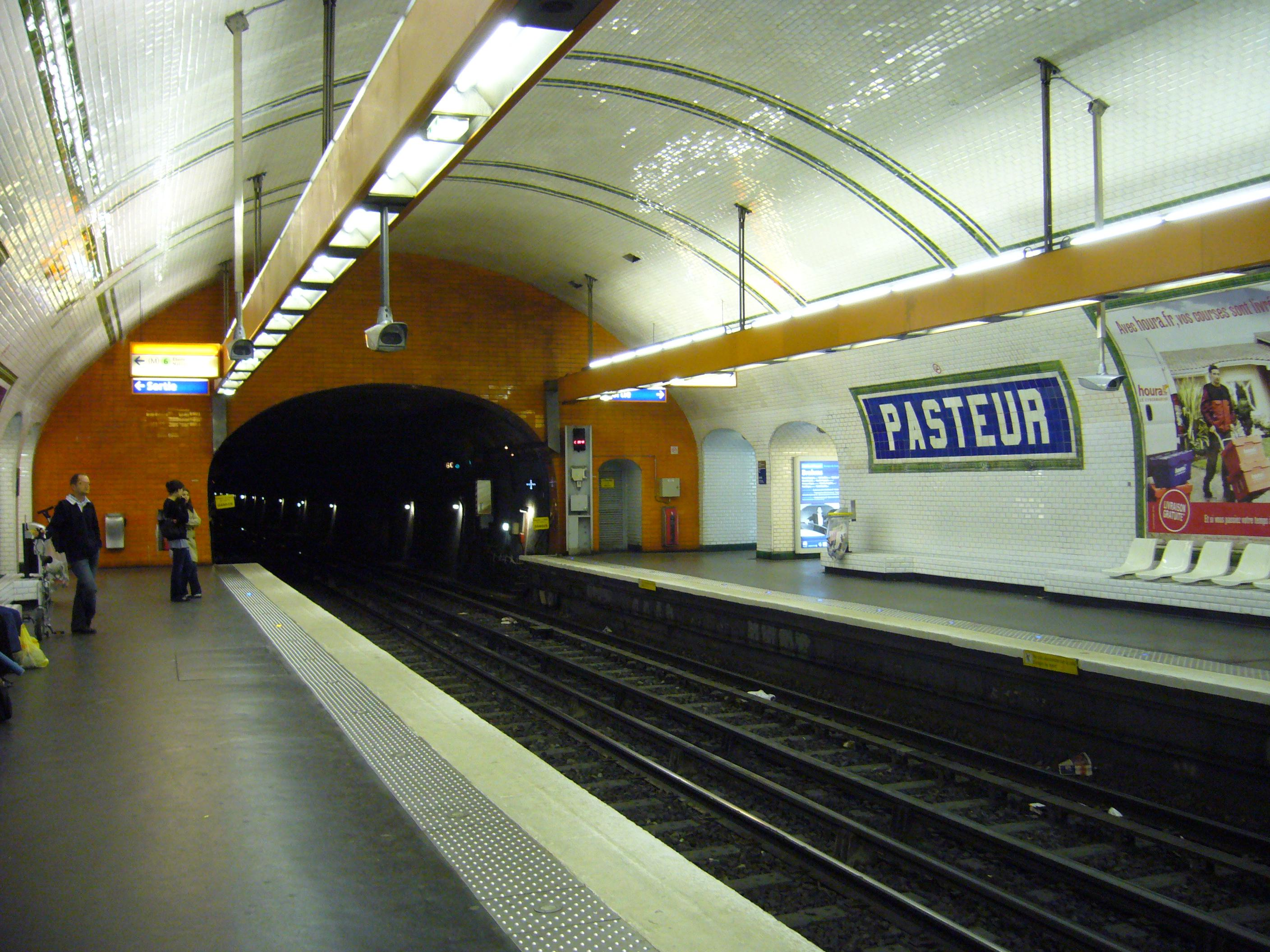
Line 12 platforms at Pasteur

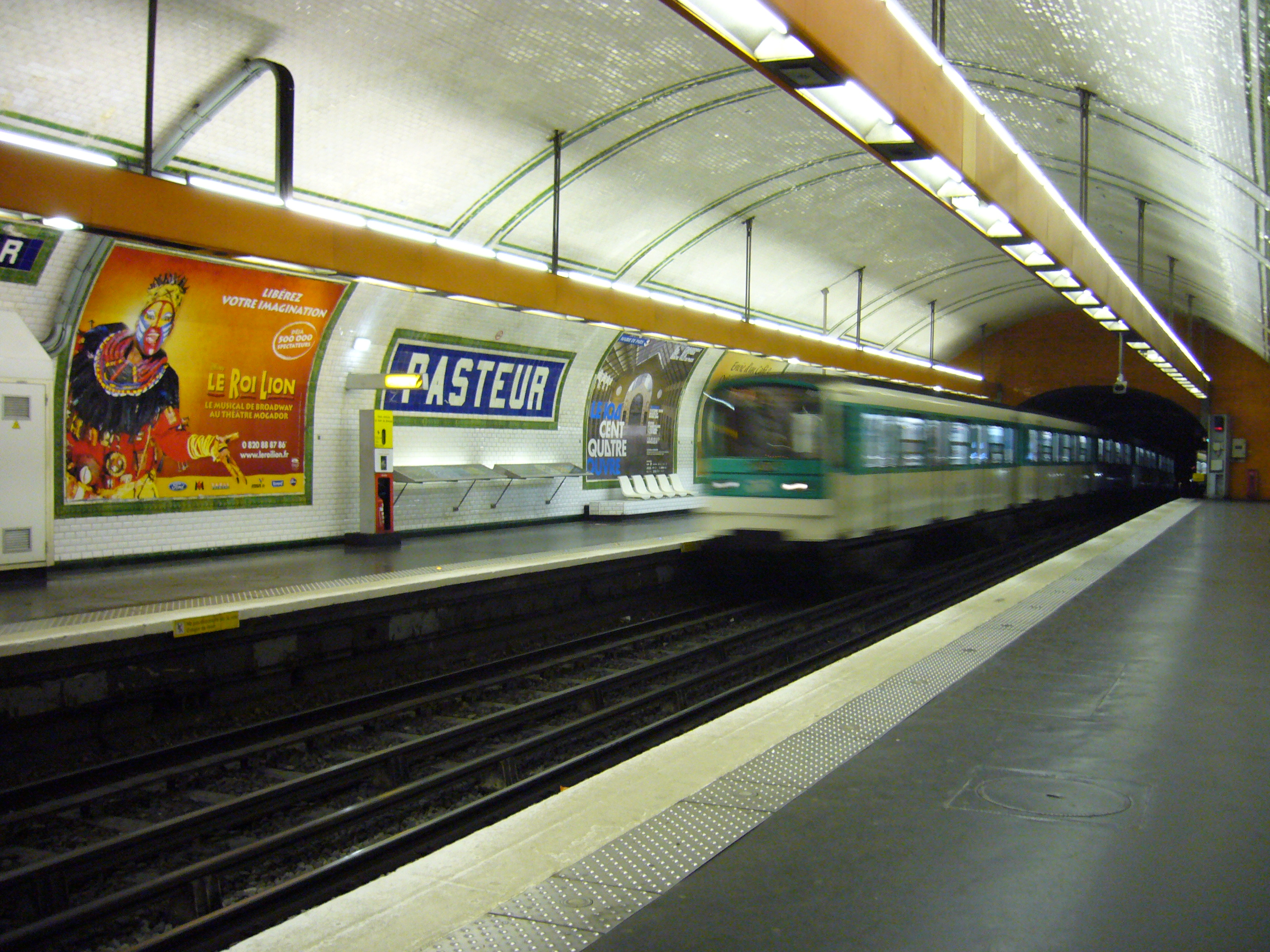
MF 67 rolling stock on Line 12 at Pasteur
