= Pasteur point =

Switch from fermentation to aerobic respiration

The Pasteur point is a level of oxygen (about 0.3% by volume which is less than 1% of Present Atmospheric Level or PAL) above which facultative aerobic microorganisms and facultative anaerobes adapt from fermentation to aerobic respiration. It is also used to mark the level of oxygen in the early atmosphere of the Earth that is believed to have led to major evolutionary changes. It is named after Louis Pasteur, the French microbiologist who studied anaerobic microbial fermentation, and is related to the Pasteur effect.

It was once supposed that about 400 million years ago, in the Cambrian period, the level of oxygen in the atmosphere rose from 0.1 to 1 percent of present atmospheric level. Supposedly, this led to many organisms adapting from fermentation to respiration, leading to organisms evolving photosynthesis and what is termed the Cambrian explosion of species. It has also been suggested that this increased oxygen level reduced the influence of ultraviolet radiation.

It is now well documented that oxygen level reached at least 10% of the present value 2.4 billion years ago (for details see Great Oxygenation Event).

== See also ==
- Pasteur effect – Inhibiting effect of oxygen on the fermentation process
- L'Atalante basin – Anoxic hypersaline brine basin at the bottom of the Mediterranean Sea
