= Pasteur Island =

Island in Adélie Land, Antarctica

- Location within Antarctica

Geography
- Location: Antarctica
- Coordinates: 66°37′S 140°6′E

Administration
- Administered under the Antarctic Treaty System

Demographics
- Population: Uninhabited

Pasteur Island is a small rocky island at the southeast end of the Dumoulin Islands, close north of Astrolabe Glacier Tongue. Photographed from the air by U.S. Navy Operation Highjump, 1946–47. Charted by the French Antarctic Expedition, 1949–51. Named by the French Antarctic Expedition, 1951–52, for Louis Pasteur, famous French chemist who made notable contributions to medical science.

== See also ==
- List of Antarctic and sub-Antarctic islands
- List of things named after Louis Pasteur
