= Institut Pasteur in Ho Chi Minh City =

Vietnamese research institute

Coordinates: 10.7861°N 106.6881°E

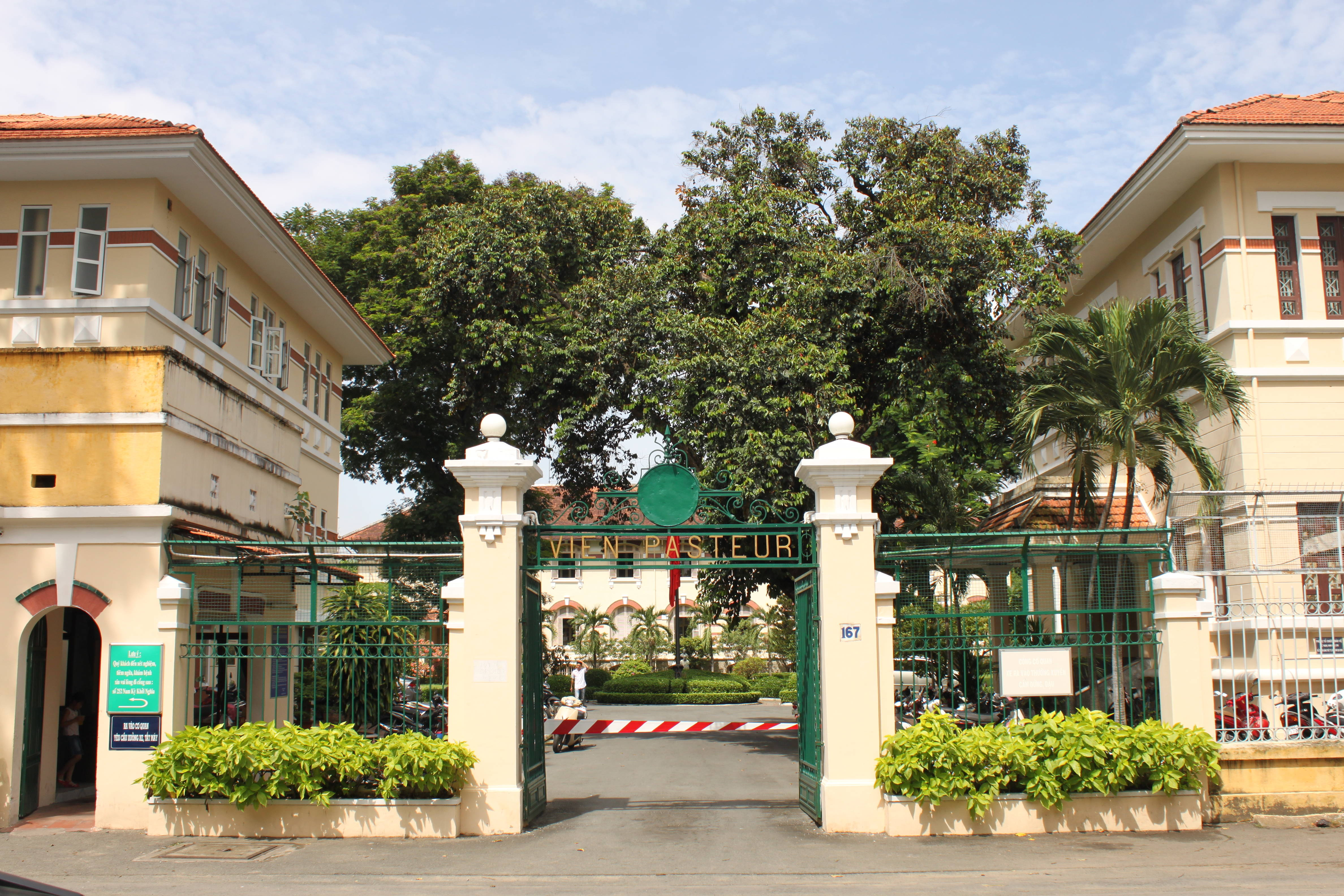
Main entrance of the Pasteur Institute in Ho Chi Minh City

The Pasteur Institute in Ho Chi Minh City is a Vietnamese national institute initially created by the French in 1891 under the name Pasteur Institute - Sai Gon, in 1975 renamed the Institute of Epidemiology, and in 1991 given the current name.

== Research ==
The research in this institute is about dengue fever, diarrheal diseases, HIV, leptospirosis and poliomyelitis.

== Photo gallery ==
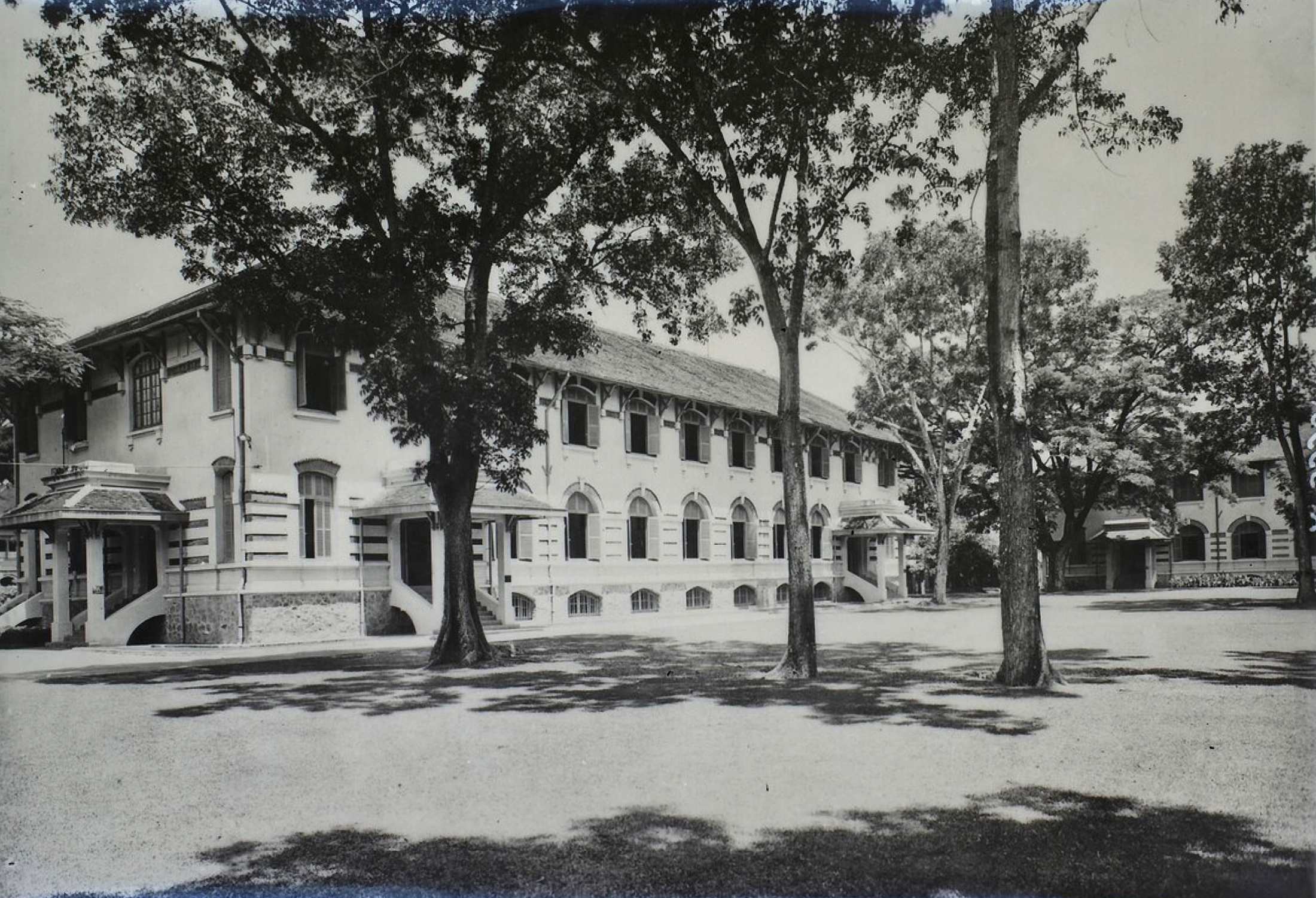
Main building in the 1920s

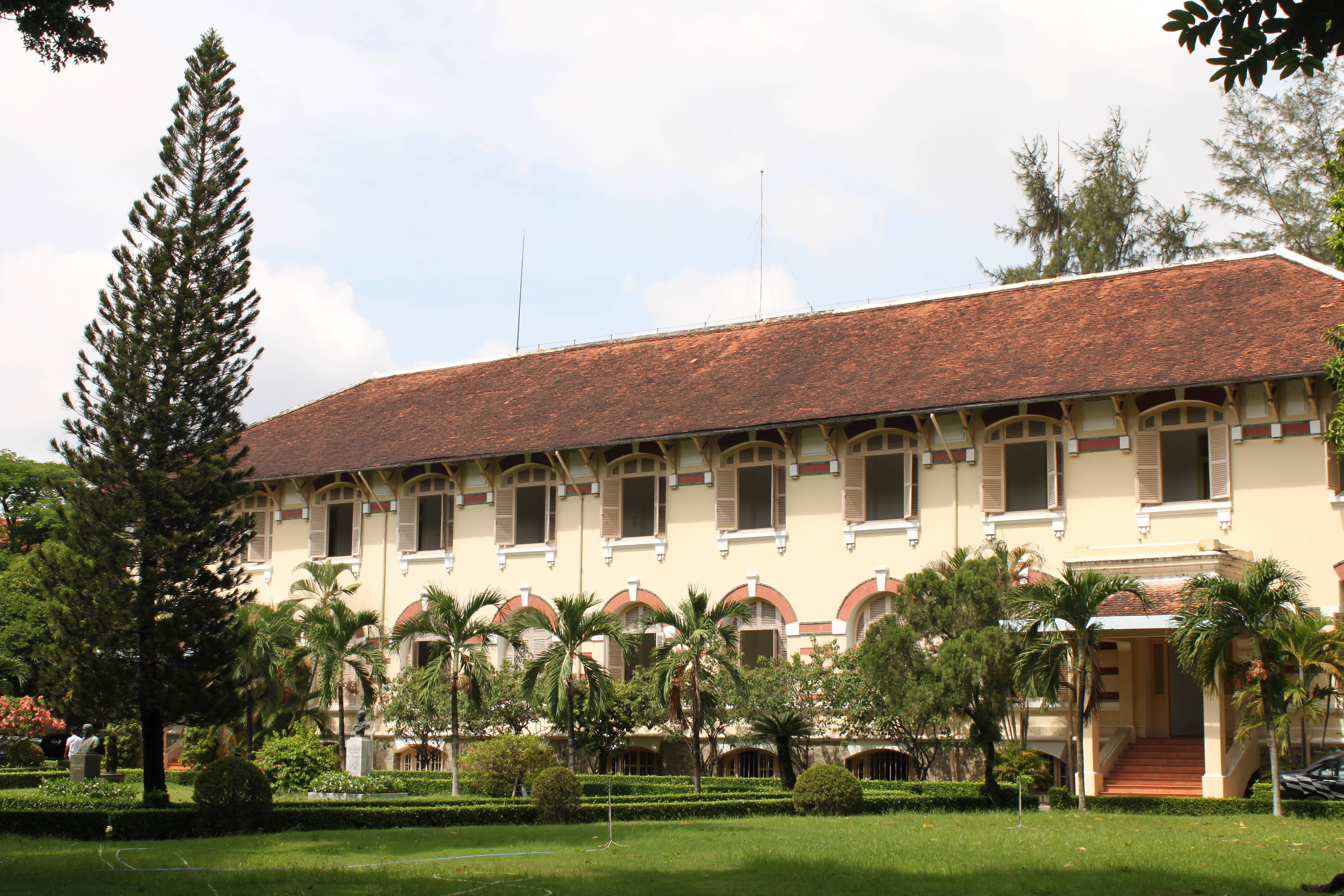
Main building

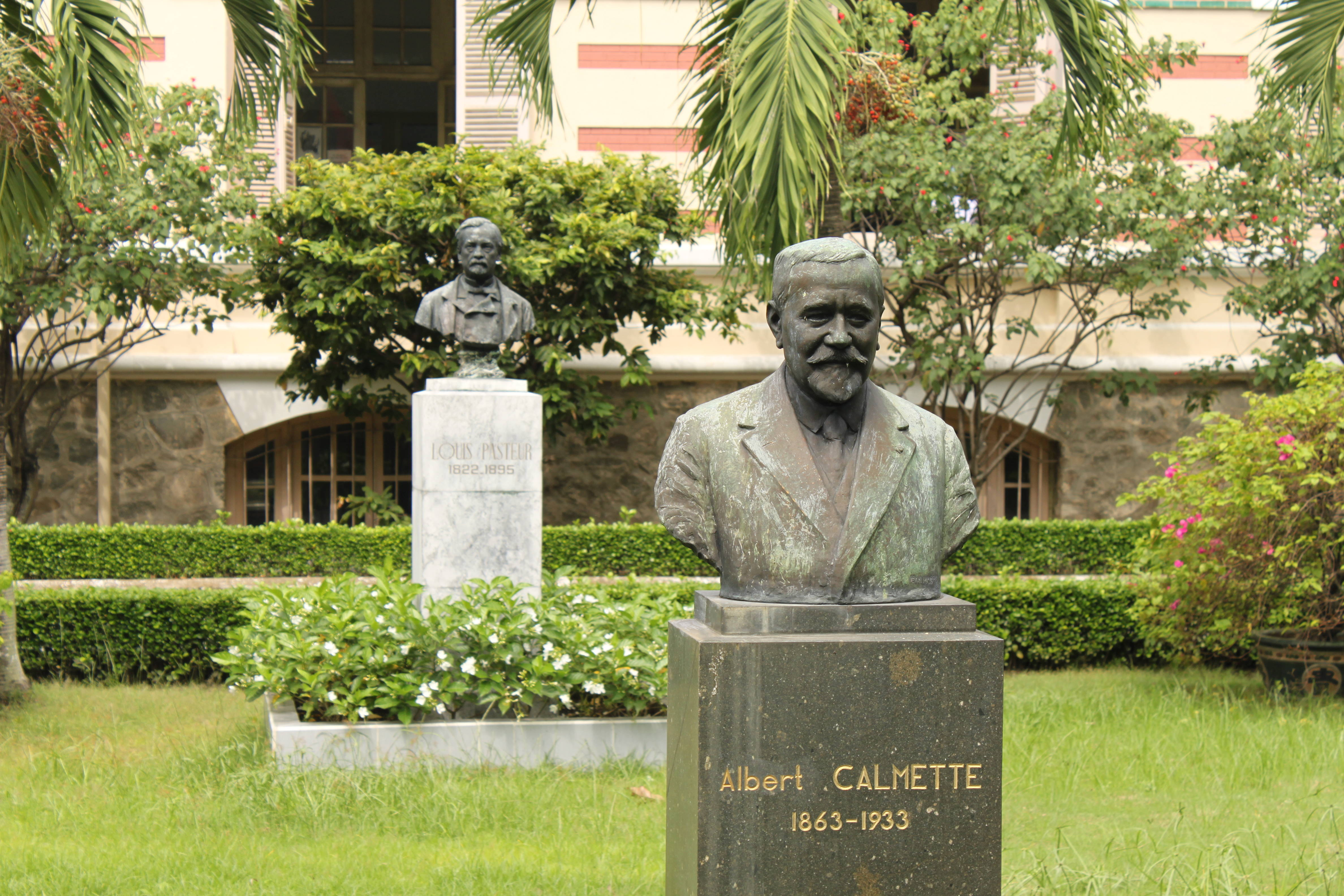
Busts of Calmette and Pasteur
