= 4804 Pasteur =

Carbonaceous main-belt asteroid

Discovery
- Discovered by: E. W. Elst
- Discovery site: La Silla Obs.
- Discovery date: 2 December 1989

Designations
- Named after: Louis Pasteur (French chemist/biologist)
- Alternative designations: 1989 XC_{1} · 1962 QB; 1971 QJ_{1}
- Minor planet category: main-belt · (middle) background

Orbital characteristics
- Epoch 4 September 2017 (JD 2458000.5)
- Uncertainty parameter 0
- Observation arc: 61.05 yr (22,298 days)
- Aphelion: 3.0075 AU
- Perihelion: 2.3739 AU
- Semi-major axis: 2.6907 AU
- Eccentricity: 0.1177
- Orbital period (sidereal): 4.41 yr (1,612 days)
- Mean anomaly: 130.06°
- Mean motion: 0° 13^{m} 23.88^{s} / day
- Inclination: 8.6298°
- Longitude of ascending node: 103.55°
- Argument of perihelion: 271.14°

Physical characteristics
- Dimensions: 15.427±0.310 km 15.98 km (calculated); 16.94±0.66 km 21.29±0.11 km 21.38±0.40 km
- Synodic rotation period: 13.69±0.02 h
- Geometric albedo: 0.05±0.00; 0.089±0.004; 0.098±0.025; 0.10 (assumed); 0.129±0.020
- Spectral type: SMASS = C · C C (SDSS–MFB)
- Absolute magnitude (H): 11.60 · 11.9 · 12.00 · 12.07±0.23 · 12.1 · 12.16

4804 Pasteur, provisional designation 1989 XC_{1}, is a carbonaceous background asteroid from the central regions of the asteroid belt, approximately 20 kilometers in diameter. It was discovered on 2 December 1989, by Belgian astronomer Eric Elst at the ESO's La Silla Observatory in Chile. The asteroid was named after French chemist and microbiologist Louis Pasteur.

== Orbit and classification ==
Pasteur is a non-family asteroid from the main belt's background population. It orbits the Sun in the intermediate asteroid belt at a distance of 2.4–3.0 AU once every 4 years and 5 months (1,612 days; semi-major axis of 2.69 AU). Its orbit has an eccentricity of 0.12 and an inclination of 9° with respect to the ecliptic.

The body's observation arc begins with a precovery taken at Palomar Observatory in March 1956, more than 33 years prior to its official discovery observation.

== Physical characteristics ==
In the SMASS classification, Pasteur is a C-type asteroid. Pan-STARRS photometric survey and SDSS–MFB (Masi–Foglia–Bus) have also characterized the body as a carbonaceous C-type.

=== Rotation period ===
In November 2011, a rotational lightcurve of Pasteur was obtained from photometric observations by astronomers at the Oakley Southern Sky Observatory in Australia. Lightcurve analysis gave a well-defined rotation period of 13.69 hours with a brightness amplitude of 0.28 magnitude (U=3).

=== Diameter and albedo ===
According to the surveys carried out by the Japanese Akari satellite and the NEOWISE mission of NASA's Wide-field Infrared Survey Explorer, Pasteur measures between 15.427 and 21.38 kilometers in diameter and its surface has an albedo between 0.05 and 0.1290.

The Collaborative Asteroid Lightcurve Link assumes an albedo of 0.10 and calculates a diameter of 15.98 kilometers based on an absolute magnitude of 12.1.

== Naming ==
This minor planet was named after French chemist and microbiologist Louis Pasteur (1822–1895), who discovered the principles of vaccination, fermentation and pasteurization. In 1888 the renowned Pasteur Institute was established in Paris. The official naming citation was published by the Minor Planet Center on 21 November 1991 (M.P.C. 19340). The lunar crater Pasteur, as well as the Martian crater Pasteur have also been named after him.
