= Lycée Pasteur de São Paulo =

Lycée International Français de São Paulo

Location
- Rua Vergueiro, 3799 - Vila Mariana; São Paulo, São Paulo; Brazil
- Coordinates: 23.5927407°S 46.629923700000006°W

Information
- Type: International school
- Website: https://www.lelyceesp.com.br/

Lycée International Français de São Paulo is a French international school located in Chácara Klabin, in Vila Mariana district of São Paulo. The school serves the levels maternelle (preschool) through lycée (senior high school).

== See also ==
- French Brazilian
