= Musée Pasteur =

Museum in Paris, France

Coordinates: 48°50′25″N 2°18′41″E

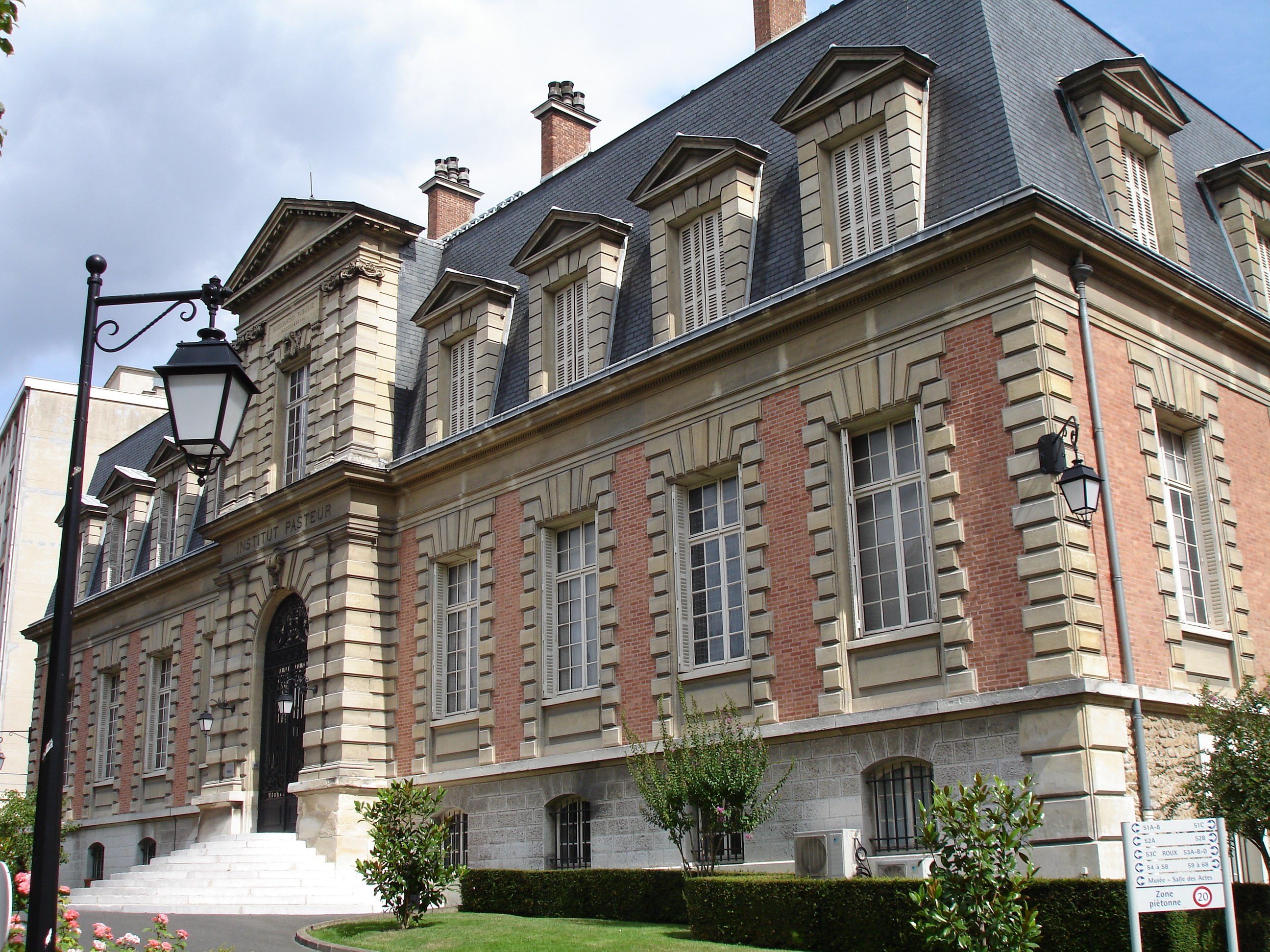
Institut Pasteur

The Musée Pasteur (French pronunciation: [myze pastœʁ], lit. 'Pasteur Museum') is a museum dedicated to French scientist Louis Pasteur. It is located within the Institut Pasteur at 25 Rue du Docteur Roux, Paris, France, in the 15th arrondissement, and is open daily in the warmer months; an admission fee is charged.

The museum was established in 1935, in honor of Louis Pasteur, and preserves his memory in the apartment where he spent the last seven years of his life, it also has an impressive room where some 1,000 scientific instruments are exhibited. The museum houses the Neo-Byzantine chapel in which he is buried.

The building was classified as a historical monument in 1981.

== See also ==
- List of museums in Paris
- List of things named after Louis Pasteur
