= Institut Pasteur Korea =

Disease research institute

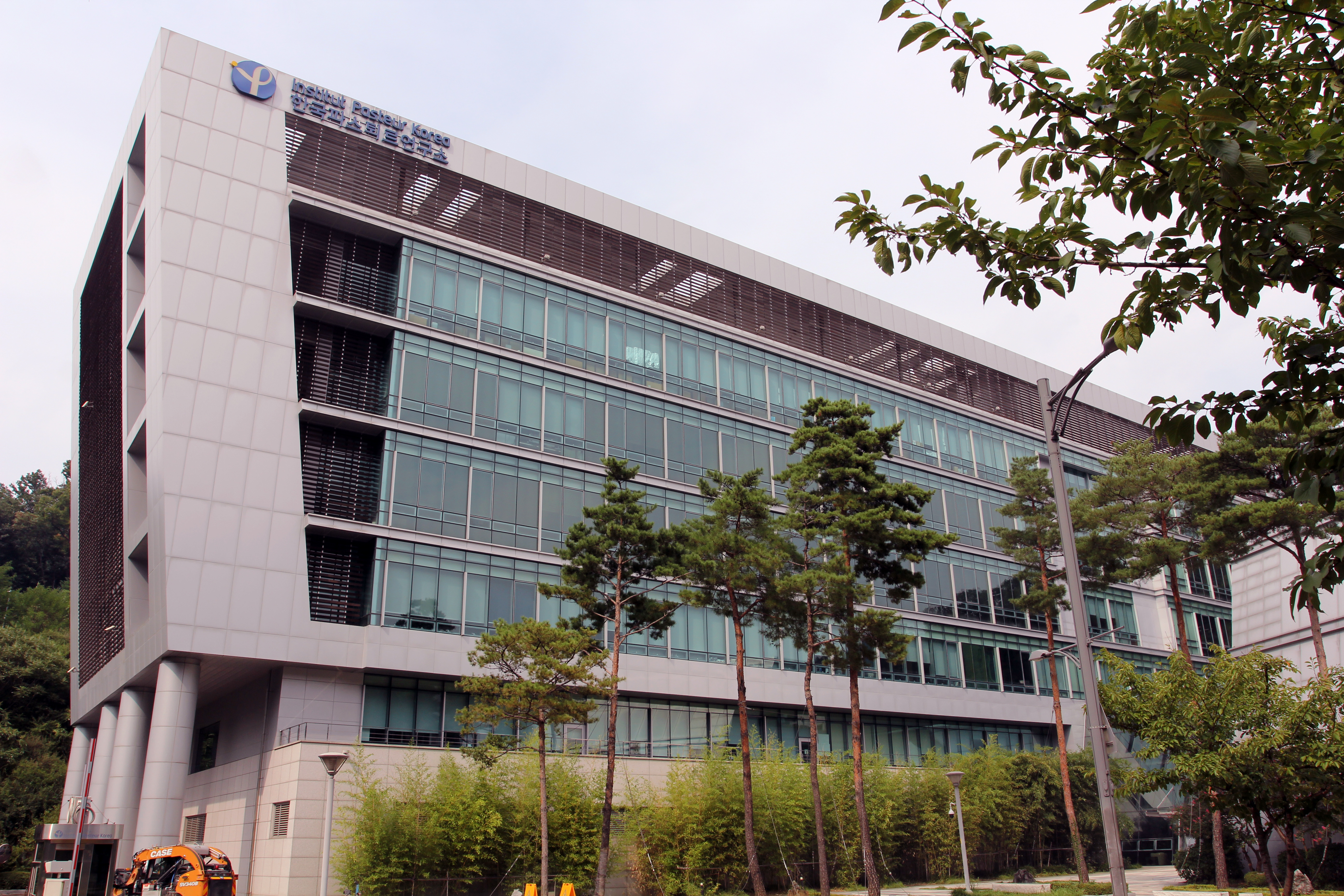
- Established: April 12, 2004
- Chair: Yong-Kyung Choe
- CEO: Youngmee Jee
- Staff: 100
- Address: 16, Daewangpangyo-ro 712beon-gil, Bundang-gu, Seongnam-si, Gyeonggi-do, Korea
- Website: www.ip-korea.org

Institut Pasteur Korea is an infectious disease-focused research institute located in Gyeonggi Province, Rep. of Korea. Its mission is to identify novel molecular targets and discover small molecules by utilizing its proprietary platforms to diagnose, treat and address serious unmet global public health needs.

It was inaugurated as a nonprofit private research institute on 12 April 2004 as a collaboration between the Institut Pasteur in Paris and Korea Institute of Science and Technology (KIST) in Seoul and it is supported by the Korean government through the Ministry of Science and ICT (former Ministry of Science and Technology) and Gyeonggi Province.

Institut Pasteur Korea has been a key driver of early drug discovery among the 33 members of the Institut Pasteur International Network located in 25 countries on 5 continents, including China, Cambodia, Laos, Vietnam and Korea within Asia.

Institut Pasteur Korea is also focused on discovery biology to study and understand TB and on the development of new and more effective ways to diagnose and treat the disease. Institut Pasteur Korea also tackles COVID-19, Antimicrobial resistance, HCV, HBV, influenza, leishmaniasis, dengue fever and cancer.

The Institute is housed in a purpose-built facility in the city of Pangyo in Gyeonggi Province, 20 km south of Seoul.

== Origins ==
Institut Pasteur Korea was established by collaboration between Institut Pasteur and KIST. The Institut Pasteur is a private foundation dedicated to the study of biology, microorganisms, diseases and vaccines. It is named after Louis Pasteur, its founder and first director, who successfully developed the first anti-rabies serum in 1885. KIST, founded in 1966, was the first multi-disciplinary scientific research institute in Korea and has contributed significantly to the economic development of the country.

In 2003, two major agreements between Institut Pasteur Paris and KIST paved the way for the launch of Institut Pasteur Korea. One established financial arrangements for the operation of the institute; the other was a general agreement on its foundation and management. Institut Pasteur Korea was mandated to expand the reach of Institut Pasteur by moving basic research toward therapy development and to introduce the “Pasteurian” research mission, management and culture to Korea. Over its 130-year history, the Institut Pasteur in Paris has combined scientific achievements with their application in public health.

Institut Pasteur Korea was inaugurated in April 2004. Operations began at the start of 2005 under the motto “From Drug to Genes”, with the mission of turning basic research into pharmaceuticals using “target-free” drug discovery. Using this approach, drugs are sought in a cellular context, with no preconceived notions of what targets within the cell are relevant.

Institut Pasteur Korea joined the Institut Pasteur International Network in November 2004 as a private foundation recognized as working toward the public good through biomedical research.

Until April 2009, Institut Pasteur Korea was located in a small facility on the campus of KIST. It then moved into a new 15,199 square meter facility in Pangyo, Gyeonggi Province. The institute is one of the few in the world that contains robotic, high throughput optical imaging capacity within biosafety level 2 and 3 facilities.

== Organization ==
Institut Pasteur Korea is organized into three divisions, Discovery Biology, Translation Research and Administration. These functional units collaborate across disciplines and classical research boundaries, providing an effective operational organization to meet the strategic goals of the institute.

== Research and technology ==
Institut Pasteur Korea’s target identification technology uses high-content, genome-wide visual arrays to identify targets of interest in live cellular disease models. By screening with siRNA libraries, researchers can identify genes that alter drug sensitivity in the cellular disease model, thereby providing a way to quickly close in on the molecular targets.

Institut Pasteur Korea’s Discovery Chemistry group applies new concepts of drug design to optimize hit-to-lead identification. Its drug discovery technology platforms have led to the first-ever TB chemical screen performed using primary macrophages and resulting in a new best-in-class molecule to fight TB, referred to as Q203.

== Financial support ==
Institut Pasteur Korea is funded through Korean government subsidies from the Ministry of Science and ICT, domestic and international grants, revenues from industry-sponsored research and license agreements, and donations.
