= Pasteur effect =

Inhibiting effect of oxygen on the fermentation process

The Pasteur effect describes how available oxygen inhibits ethanol fermentation, driving yeast to switch toward aerobic respiration for increased generation of the energy carrier adenosine triphosphate (ATP). More generally, in the medical literature, the Pasteur effect refers to how the presence of oxygen causes a decrease in the cellular rate of glycolysis and suppression of lactate accumulation. The effect occurs in animal tissues, as well as in microorganisms belonging to the fungal kingdom.

== Discovery ==
In 1857, microbiologist Louis Pasteur showed that aeration of yeasted broth causes cell growth to increase while the fermentation rate decreases, based on lowered ethanol production.

== Explanation ==
Yeast, being facultative anaerobes, can produce ATP through both ethanol fermentation and aerobic respiration. When oxygen concentration is low, the two pyruvate molecules formed through glycolysis are each fermented into ethanol and carbon dioxide. Whilst only 2 ATP are produced per glucose by glycolysis, this method is utilized under anaerobic conditions because it oxidizes the electron shuttle NADH into NAD^{+} for another round of glycolysis and ethanol fermentation.

If the concentration of oxygen increases, pyruvate is instead converted to acetyl CoA, used in the citric acid cycle, and undergoes oxidative phosphorylation. Per glucose, 10 NADH and 2 FADH_{2} are produced in cellular respiration for a significant amount of proton pumping to produce a proton gradient utilized by ATP Synthase. While the exact ATP output varies depending on factors including the overall electrochemical gradient, aerobic respiration produces far more ATP than the anaerobic process of ethanol fermentation. The increased ATP and citrate from aerobic respiration allosterically inhibit the glycolysis enzyme phosphofructokinase 1 because less pyruvate is needed to produce the same amount of ATP.

Despite this energetic incentive, Rosario Lagunas has shown that yeast continue to partially ferment available glucose into ethanol for many reasons. First, glucose metabolism is faster through ethanol fermentation because it involves fewer enzymes and limits all reactions to the cytoplasm. Secondly, ethanol has bactericidal activity by causing damage to the cell membrane and denaturing proteins, allowing yeast fungi to outcompete environmental bacteria for resources. Further, partial fermentation may be a defense mechanism against environmental competitors depleting all oxygen faster than the yeast's regulatory systems could fully switch from aerobic respiration to ethanol fermentation.

== Practical implications ==
The fermentation processes used in alcohol production are commonly maintained in low oxygen conditions, under a blanket of carbon dioxide, while growing yeast for biomass instead involves aerating the broth for maximized energy production. Despite the bactericidal effects of ethanol, the acidifying effects of fermentation, and the low oxygen conditions of industrial alcohol production, bacteria that undergo lactic acid fermentation can still contaminate fermentation systems as lactic acid has a low pKa of 3.86 which avoids decoupling of the pH membrane gradient that supports regulated transport.

== See also ==
- Ethanol fermentation
- Fermentation (biochemistry)
- Facultative anaerobic organism
- Allosteric regulation
