= Nha Trang (city) =

Former provincial city in South Central Coast, Vietnam

- Provincial city (Class-1)
- Nha Trang City; Thành phố Nha Trang
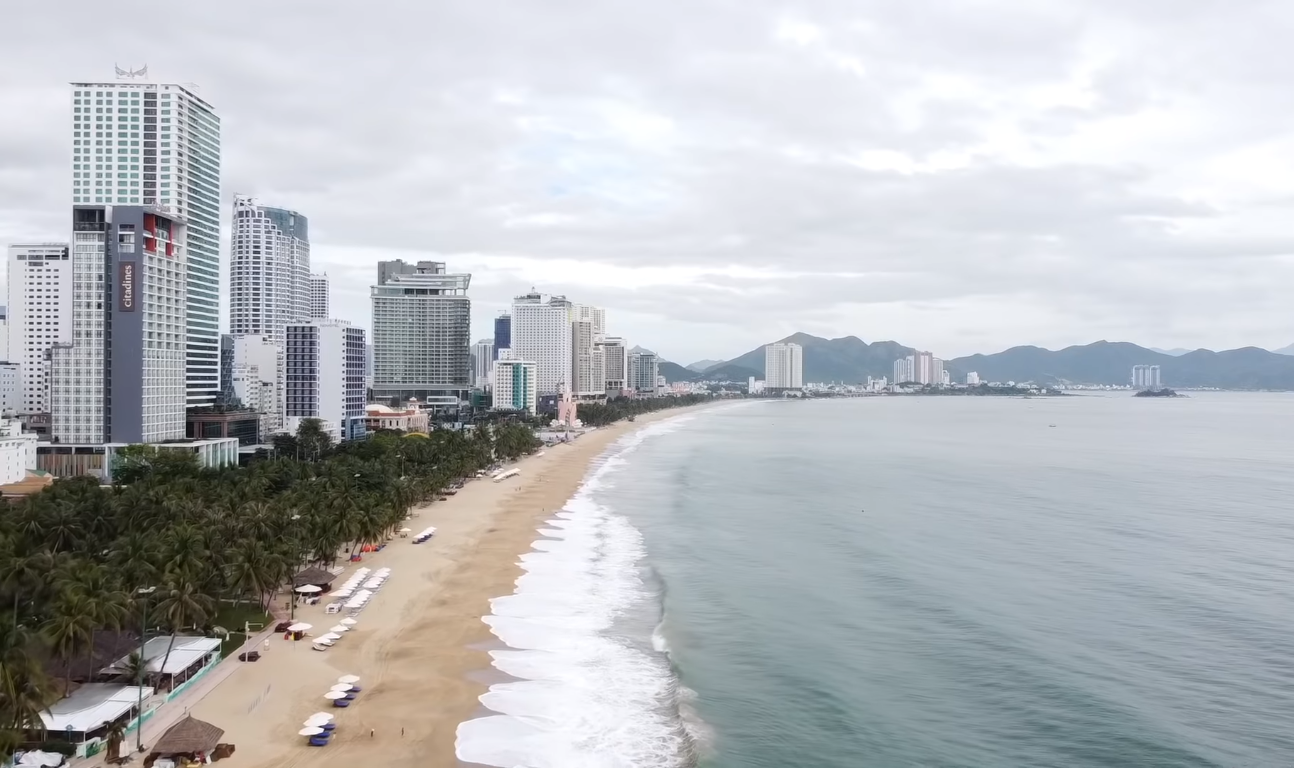
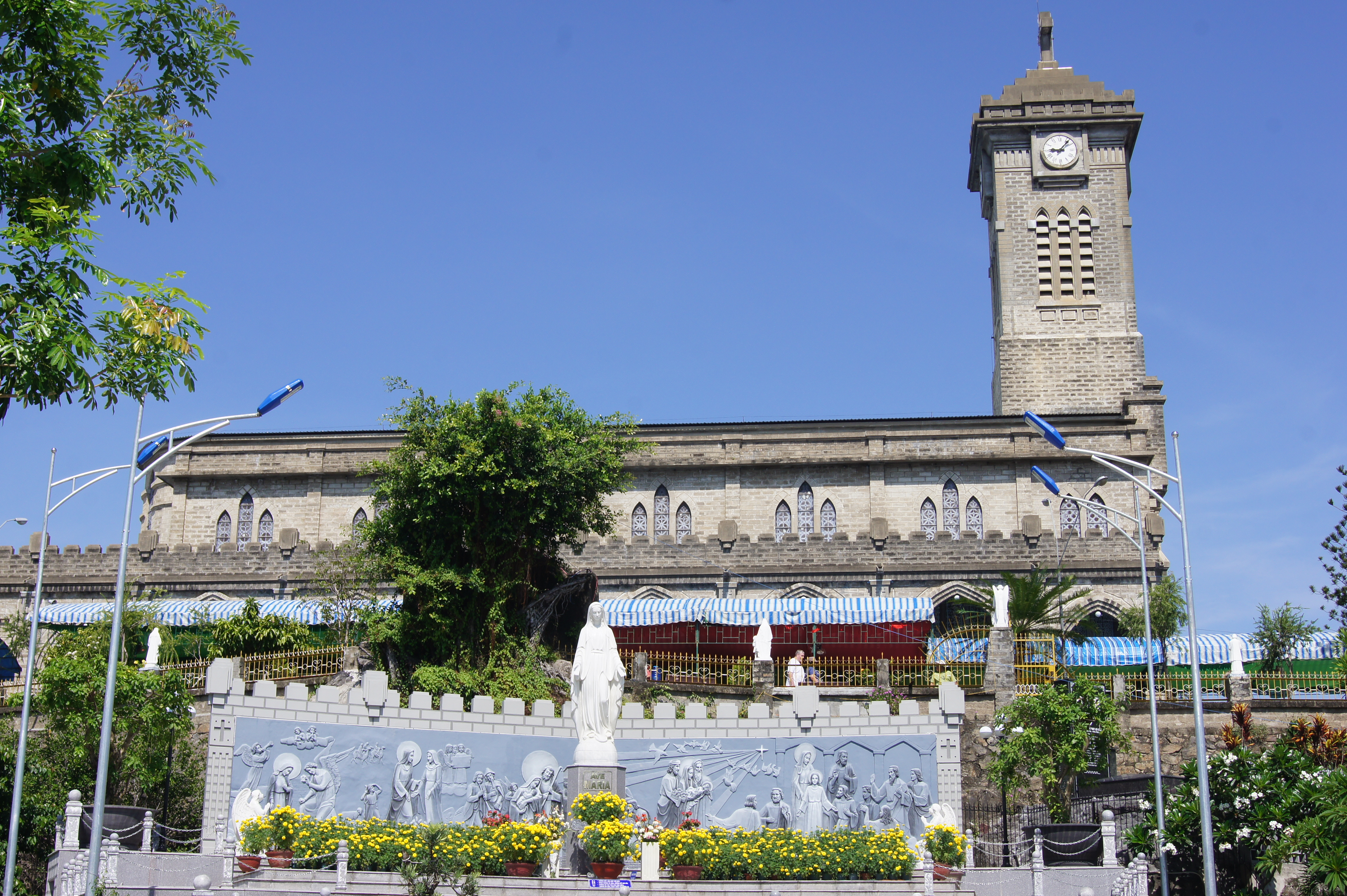
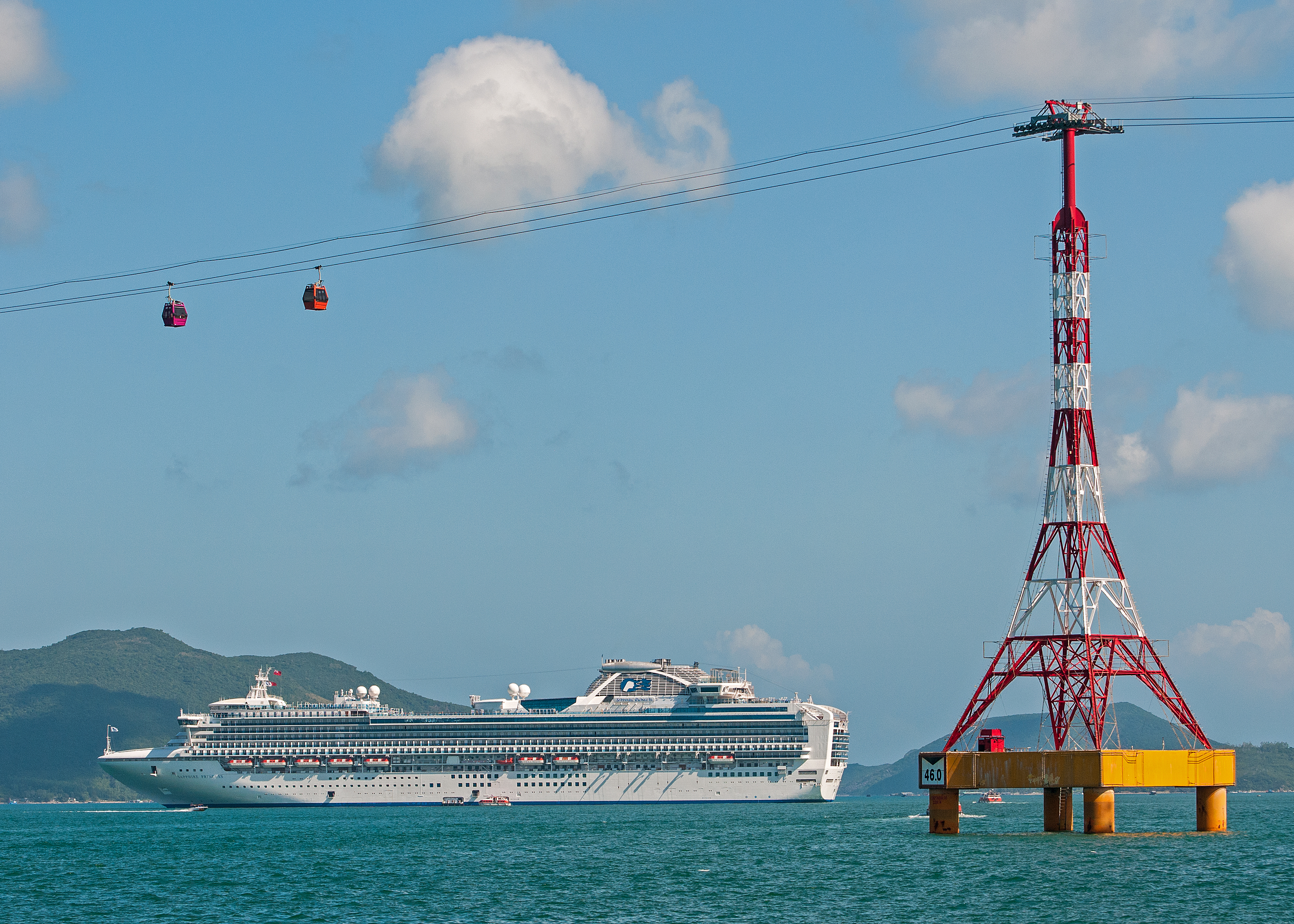
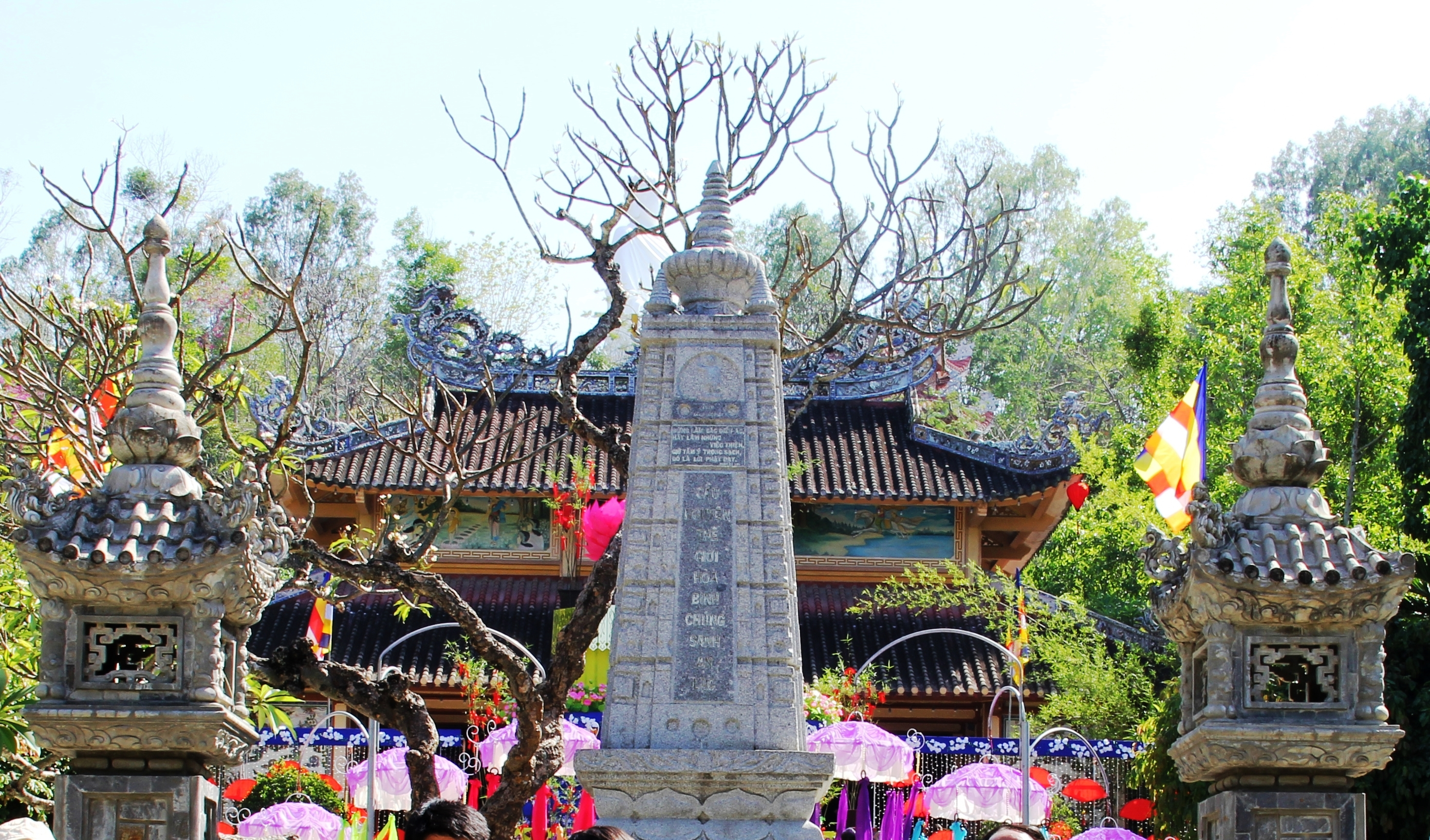
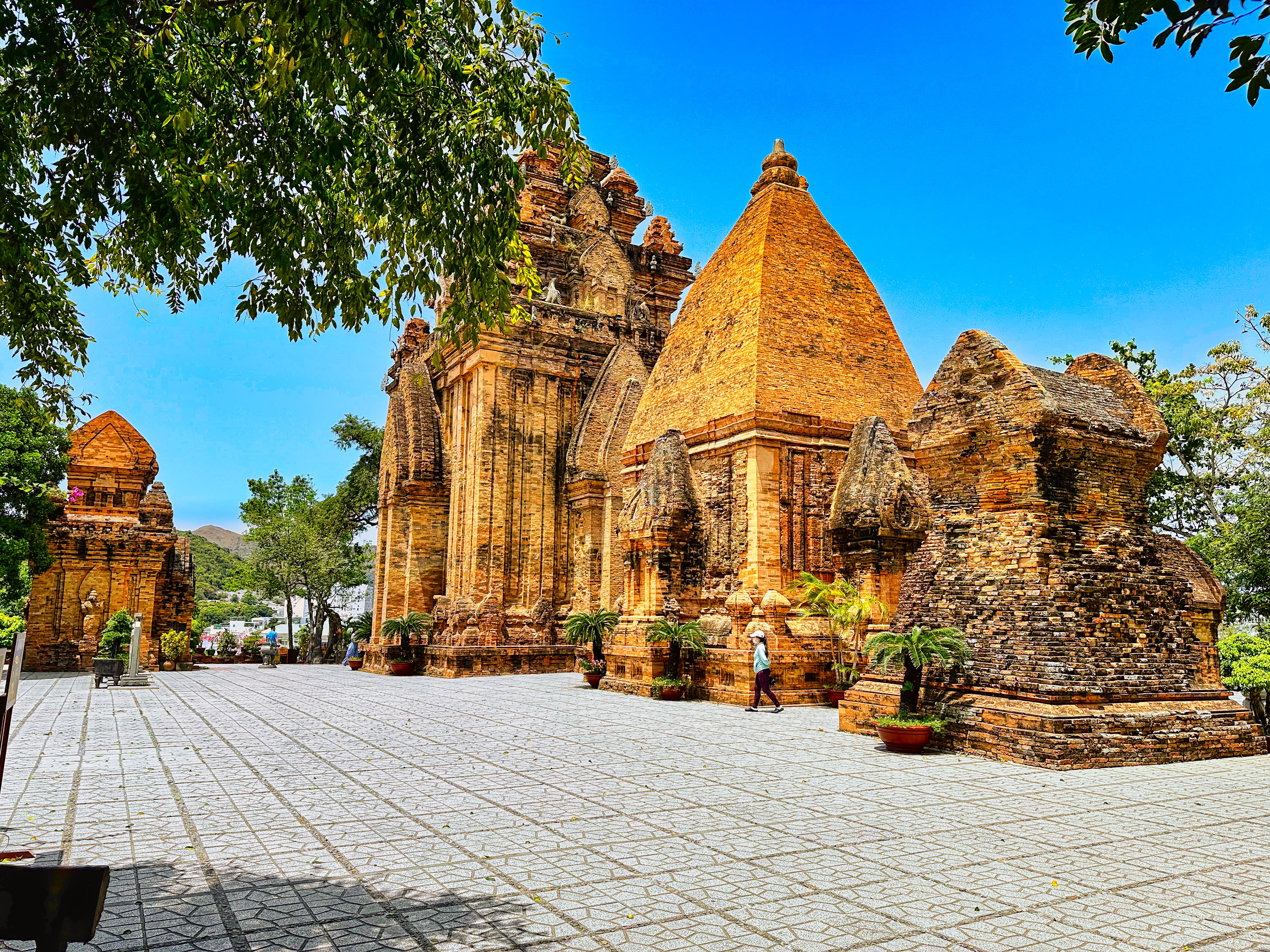
- Skyline alongside Nha Trang Beach Christ the King Cathedral Nha Trang Bay Long Sơn Temple Po Nagar Towers

- Seal

- Location in Vietnam Nha Trang (Southeast Asia) Nha Trang (Asia)
- Coordinates: 12°14′42″N 109°11′30″E
- Country: Vietnam
- Region: South Central Coast
- Province: Khánh Hòa
- Founded: March 30, 1977
- Dissolved: July 1, 2025

Area
  - Provincial city (Class-1): 254.29 km^{2} (98.18 sq mi)

Population (2023)
  - Provincial city (Class-1): 579,000
  - Density: 2,280/km^{2} (5,900/sq mi)
  - Urban: 407,000
  - Ethnicities: Kinh; Hoa; Cham

Metro GDP (PPP, constant 2015 values)
  - Year: 2023
  - Total: $3.9 billion
  - Per capita: $11,500
- Time zone: GMT + 7
- ZIP code: 625080
- Climate: As
- Website: nhatrang.khanhhoa.gov.vn

Nha Trang (English: /ˌnjɑːˈtræŋ/ or /ˌnɑːˈtræŋ/; Vietnamese: [ɲa˧ ʈʂaŋ˧]) is a former coastal city and the former capital of Khánh Hòa, on the South Central Coast of Vietnam. It was bounded on the north by the Ninh Hoà town, on the south by Cam Ranh city and on the west by Diên Khánh District. The city had a population of about 535,000 people in 2023.

Historically, the city was known as Kauthara under rule of the Kingdom of Champa. The city is still home to the famous Po Nagar Towers built by the Champa. Being a coastal city, Nha Trang is a center for marine science based at the Nha Trang Oceanography Institute. The Hon Mun marine protected area is one of four first marine protected areas in the world admitted by the IUCN.

Nha Trang is well known for its beaches and scuba diving and has developed into a popular destination for international tourists, attracting large numbers of backpackers, as well as more affluent travelers on the south-east Asia circuit; it is already very popular with Vietnamese tourists, with Nha Trang Bay widely considered as among the world's most beautiful bays. Tourists are welcomed to participate in the Sea Festival, held biennially.

On 1 July 2025, Nha Trang ceased to exist as a municipal city following the elimination of district level units in Vietnam.

== Etymology ==
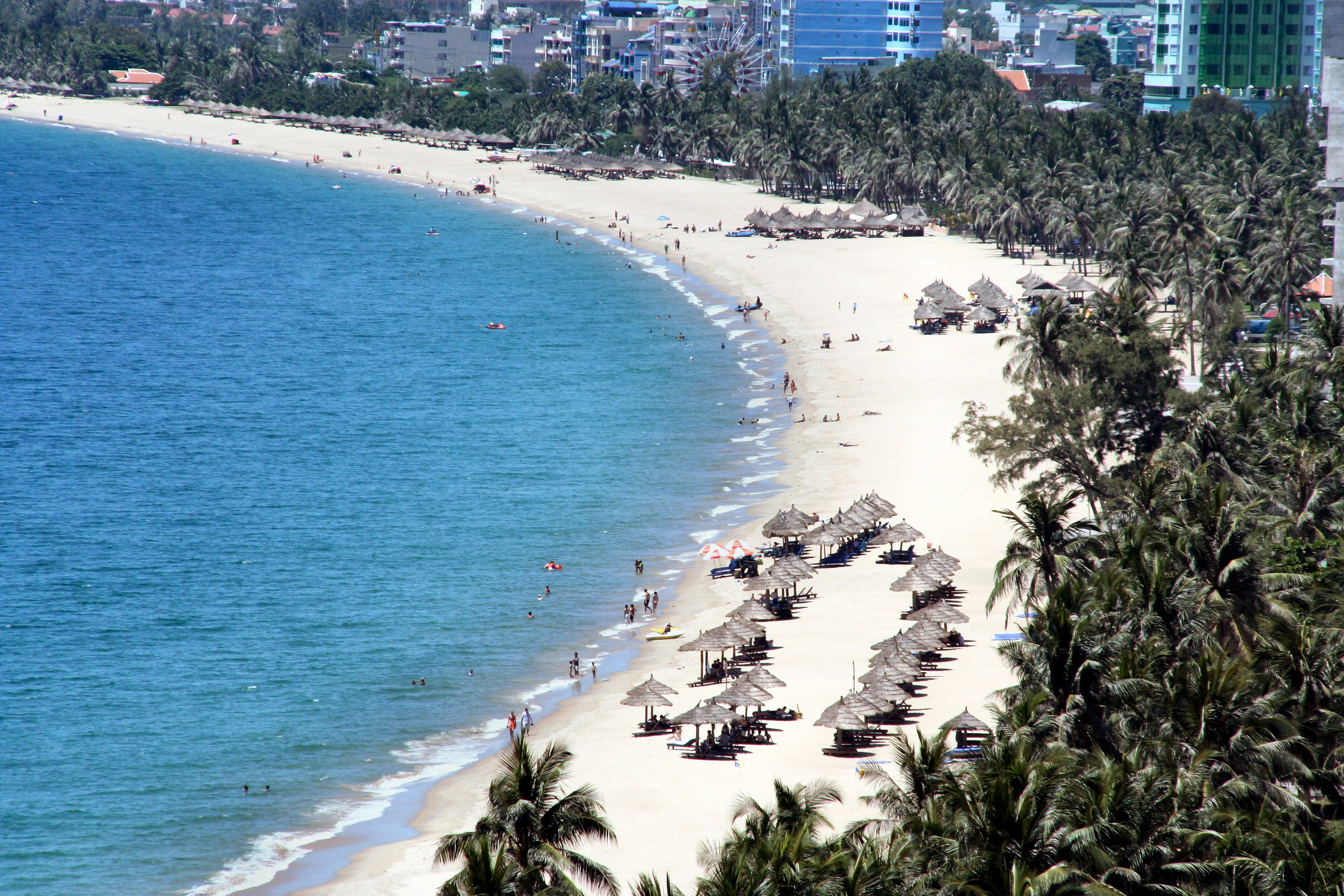
Nha Trang's beach

According to some researchers, the name Nha Trang derives from a Vietnamese spelling of the Cham language name of the site Ea Dran (literally "Reed River"), the name of the Cai River as referred to by the Cham people. From the name of this river, the name was adopted to call what is now Nha Trang, which was officially made Vietnam's territory in 1698. Ea Dran is a common Cham and Montagnard place name, same as Ia Drang Valley.

As far as the recorded naming of Nha Trang is concerned, in Toàn tập Thiên Nam Tứ Chí Lộ Đồ Thư, a geographical book written by a Vietnamese scholar with the family of Đỗ Bá in the second half of the 18th century, the name Nha Trang Môn ("Nha Trang gate") was mentioned. In another map dating to the 17th century, known as Giáp Ngọ Niên Bình Nam Đồ by a noble called Đoan Quận công Bùi Thế Đạt, the name Nha Trang Hải môn (Nha Trang Sea Gate) was also cited. In Vietnamese recorded historic bibliographies, these books are perhaps the earliest ones that mentioned this place name.

In a work by Lê Quý Đôn called Phủ biên tạp lục (1776), many Nha Trang-related names were mentioned, such as đầm Nha Trang, dinh Nha Trang, nguồn Nha Trang, and đèo Nha Trang.

== History ==
Kauthara, also translated as an ancient clam, is a constituent state of the empire-leading kingdom and its ruling area is located in the area from today's Fu A province to Cam Ranh. Yanpunagara, the capital of Yangpu, occupies the faith of a man and is deeply influenced by religions such as Hinduism and Buddhism. However, in addition to that, the gods who formerly occupied ruled the indigenous faith in the motherland, such as Çri Maladakuthara (釋利摩落陀古笪羅) in the ancient Gur'an region in the south, are one of those who can preserve the old God Most of the old gods who dominated the motherland were replaced by brahmanist gods such as the goddess Yan Pu Nagara (楊浦那竭羅) and the Bhagavati (妻婆伽婆底), Replaced, located in Nha Trang near today. Bhagavati is mixed with Yan Pu Nagara, a goddess in the local faith, which is quite revered by the people and has dedicated ancestral temples to enshrine it.

From 1653 to the 19th century, Nha Trang was a deserted area rich in wildlife (animals like tigers) and was a part of Hà Bạc, Vĩnh Xương County, Diên Khánh Province. After just two decades in the early 20th century, Nha Trang underwent a rapid change. On August 30, 1924, the Governor-General of French Indochina decreed Nha Trang as a townlet (urban centre). Nha Trang Townlet was established from the ancient villages of Xương Huân, Phương Câu, Vạn Thạnh, Phương Sài, and Phước Hải.

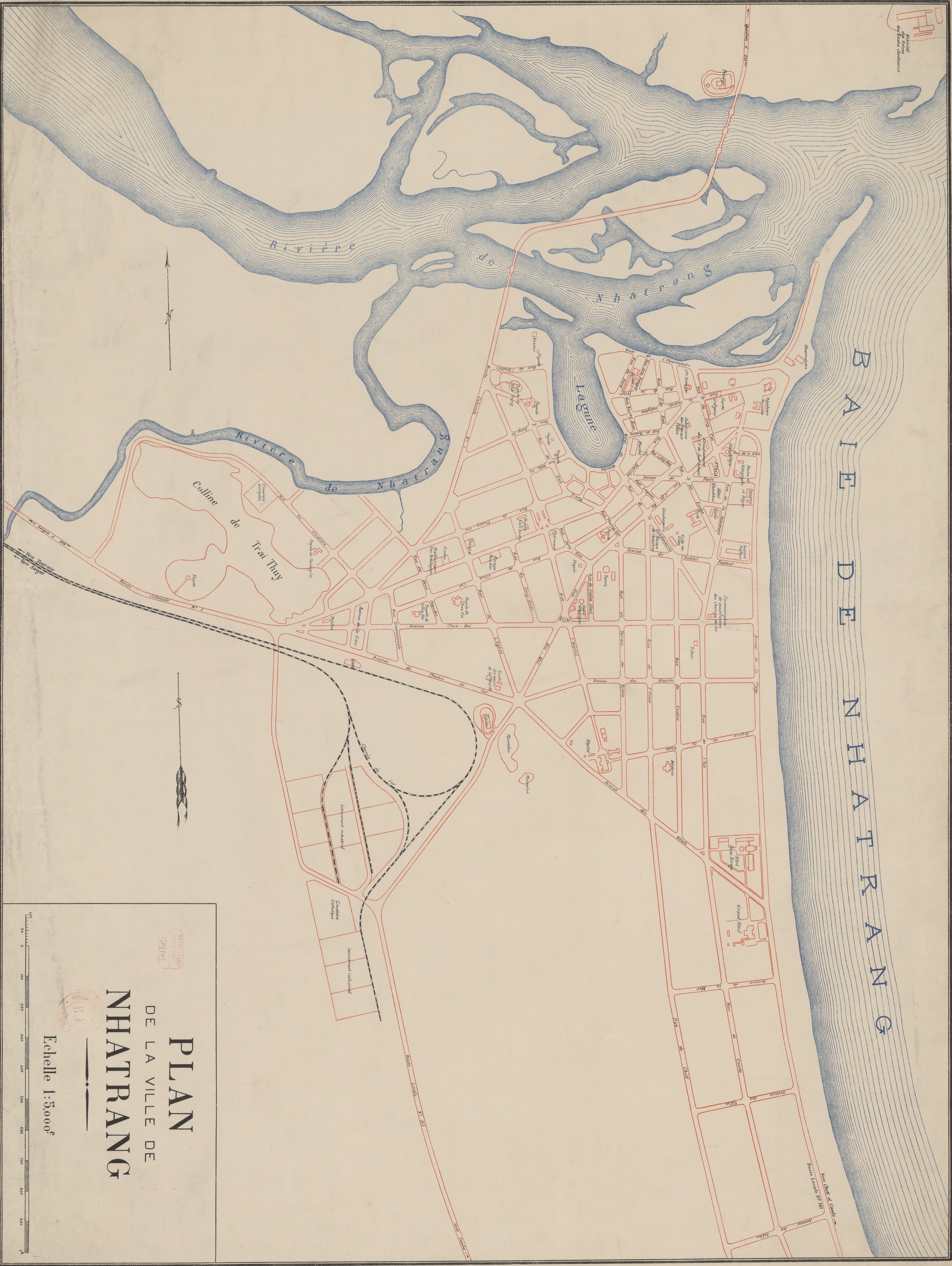
Map of Nha Trang in 1933

During French Indochina, Nha Trang was seen as de facto capital of Khánh Hòa Province. The colonial administration offices (like Envoy Office, Commanding Office, Trade Office, Post Office) were situated in Nha Trang. Local royal offices like Province Chief, Provincial Judge, Military Commander are in Diên Khánh city (a walled military city 10 km south-west of Nha Trang).

On 7 May 1937, the Governor-General of French Indochina by another decree upgraded Nha Trang Townlet to town. At this time, Nha Trang Town had five wards based on the ancient villages merged to make the town: Xương Huân, Phương Câu, Vạn Thạnh, Phương Sài, and Phước Hải.

On 27 January 1958, the president of the Republic of Vietnam, Ngô Đình Diệm by Decree 18-BNV abrogated the town status of Nha Trang and divided Nha Trang into two rural communes: Nha Trang Đông (Eastern Nha Trang) and Nha Trang Tây (Western Nha Trang), under the administration of Vĩnh Xương County.

During the late 1960s, the U.S. Army's First Field Force, Vietnam (1FFV) was headquartered in Nha Trang. 1FFV was a corps-level major subordinate command of the U.S. Army Military Assistance Command, Vietnam (MACV).

On 22 October 1970, the government of the Republic of Vietnam by Decree 132-SL/NV reestablished Nha Trang Town on the ground of Nha Trang Đông and Nha Trang Tây and other rural communes. Following that establishment, the government by Decree 357-ĐUHC/NC/NĐ dated 5 June 1971 divided Nha Trang into 11 urban zones.

On 2 April 1975, communist (Viet Cong/PRG/VPA) forces captured the city. On 4 April 1975, Khánh Hòa Military Commission (Ủy ban Quân quản Khánh Hòa) divided Nha Trang into three administrative districts: District 1, District 2 and Vĩnh Xương District. In September 1975, the districts were merged to become one entity, the town of Nha Trang.

On 30 March 1977, the Council of the Government (now the cabinet) of the Socialist Republic of Vietnam by Decision 391-CP/QĐ upgraded Nha Trang to city status, a county-level city under the administration of Phú Khánh Province (a province created by merger of now Phú Yên Province and Khánh Hòa Province). Seven communes of former Vĩnh Xương County, namely Vĩnh Thái, Vĩnh Ngọc, Vĩnh Hiệp, Vĩnh Lương, Vĩnh Trung, Vĩnh Thạnh, Vĩnh Phương was split from Khánh Xương County to become Nha Trang City territory.

On 27 March 1978, the provincial government by Decision 54-BT founded Phước Đồng Commune under Nha Trang City.

On 1 July 1989, Khanh Hoa was split from Phu Khanh Province to become Khánh Hòa Province as it was before, Nha Trang was made the capital of Khánh Hòa Province. On April 22, 1999, Phan Văn Khải by Decision 106/1999 recognized Nha Trang City as a second-class municipal city. On April 22, 2009, former Prime Minister Nguyễn Tấn Dũng recognized Nha Trang City as a first-class municipal city.

== Geography ==
Nha Trang city has a metropolitan area of 251 km^{2} (97 sq mi) and population of about 500,000. It borders Ninh Hòa town in the north, Cam Ranh city in the south, Diên Khánh town in the west and the East Sea to the east. The city is on the beautiful Nha Trang Bay, which was chosen by Travel + Leisure in two succeeding years as one of 29 most beautiful bays in the world. Nha Trang is surrounded on all three sides by mountains and a large island and four smaller ones on the fourth side (in the ocean directly in front of the city's main area), blocking major storms from potentially damaging the city.

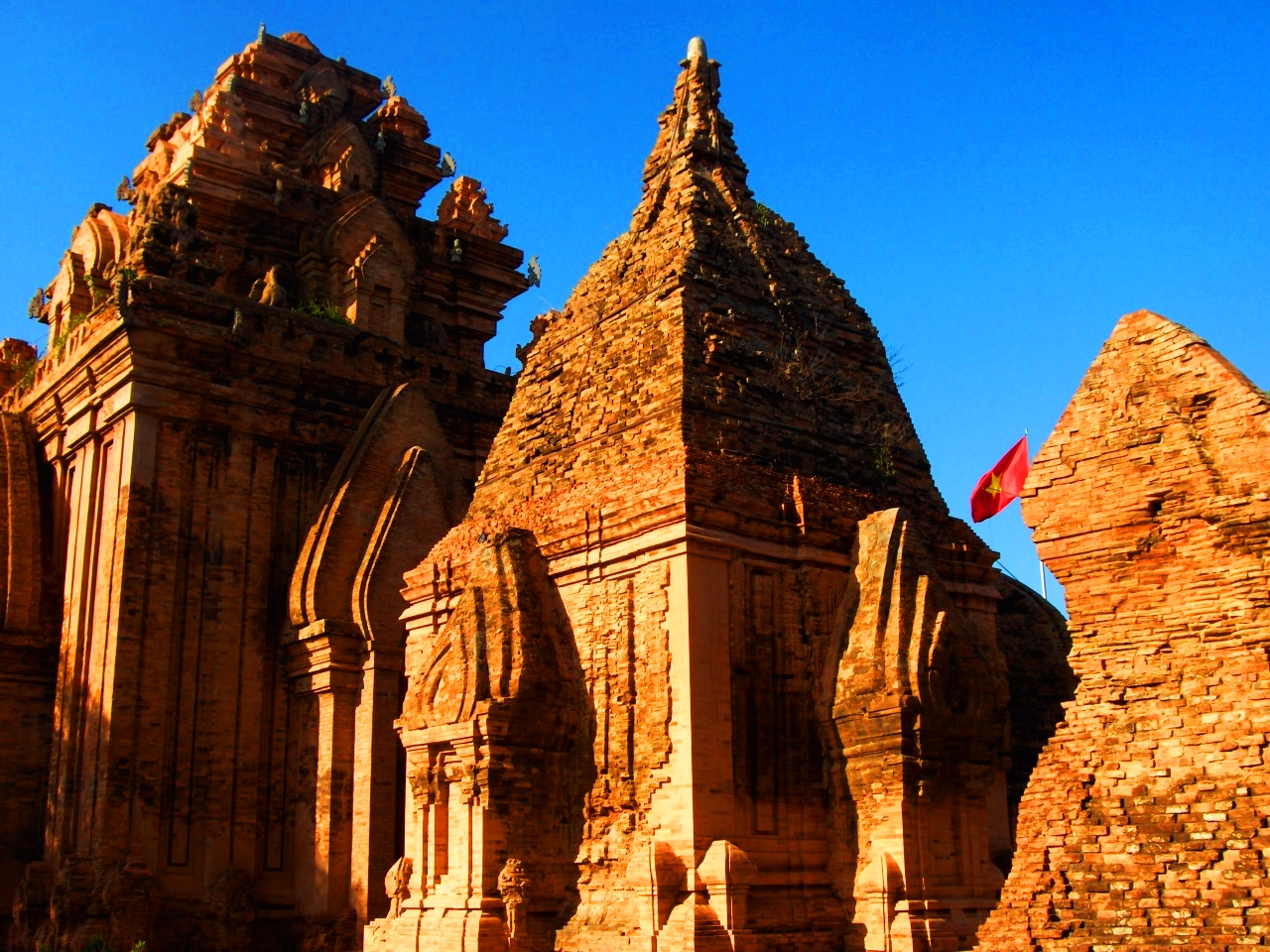
Po Nagar towers at the mouth of Cái River

=== Climate ===
Nha Trang has a tropical savanna climate (Köppen climate classification: As), with a lengthy dry season from January to August and a shorter wet season from September to December, when 1,029 mm (41 in) of the city's total annual rainfall of about 1,300 mm (51 in) is received from the north-east monsoon. During the wet season extremely heavy rainfall from typhoons is not uncommon, though the city is shielded from the worst winds.

Climate data for Nha Trang
Month	Jan	Feb	Mar	Apr	May	Jun	Jul	Aug	Sep	Oct	Nov	Dec	Year
Record high °C (°F)	31.9 (89.4)	33.3 (91.9)	34.2 (93.6)	35.9 (96.6)	38.5 (101.3)	39.5 (103.1)	39.0 (102.2)	39.5 (103.1)	38.3 (100.9)	34.8 (94.6)	34.3 (93.7)	32.8 (91.0)	39.5 (103.1)
Mean daily maximum °C (°F)	27.2 (81.0)	28.0 (82.4)	29.4 (84.9)	31.1 (88.0)	32.3 (90.1)	32.7 (90.9)	32.5 (90.5)	32.6 (90.7)	31.7 (89.1)	30.0 (86.0)	28.6 (83.5)	27.3 (81.1)	30.3 (86.5)
Daily mean °C (°F)	24.0 (75.2)	24.6 (76.3)	25.8 (78.4)	27.4 (81.3)	28.6 (83.5)	28.8 (83.8)	28.5 (83.3)	28.5 (83.3)	27.8 (82.0)	26.7 (80.1)	25.8 (78.4)	24.7 (76.5)	26.8 (80.2)
Mean daily minimum °C (°F)	21.4 (70.5)	21.8 (71.2)	23.0 (73.4)	24.6 (76.3)	25.5 (77.9)	25.7 (78.3)	25.6 (78.1)	25.5 (77.9)	24.9 (76.8)	24.2 (75.6)	23.5 (74.3)	22.3 (72.1)	24.0 (75.2)
Record low °C (°F)	14.6 (58.3)	14.6 (58.3)	16.4 (61.5)	19.4 (66.9)	19.7 (67.5)	19.8 (67.6)	20.6 (69.1)	21.5 (70.7)	21.3 (70.3)	18.8 (65.8)	16.9 (62.4)	15.1 (59.2)	14.6 (58.3)
Average rainfall mm (inches)	43.0 (1.69)	16.1 (0.63)	30.3 (1.19)	41.8 (1.65)	51.5 (2.03)	49.8 (1.96)	41.7 (1.64)	81.7 (3.22)	165.8 (6.53)	312.3 (12.30)	381.6 (15.02)	191.4 (7.54)	1,399.2 (55.09)
Average rainy days	8.6	4.3	4.1	5.0	9.2	8.3	8.4	9.8	14.4	17.6	18.0	14.4	122.2
Average relative humidity (%)	78.1	78.7	79.6	80.4	78.8	77.2	76.9	77.2	80.0	82.6	81.8	79.7	79.3
Mean monthly sunshine hours	179.6	208.7	256.5	258.5	259.1	235.2	243.5	236.0	203.8	183.1	140.4	136.5	2,538.8
Source 1: Vietnam Institute for Building Science and Technology
Source 2: The Yearbook of Indochina

== Administrative divisions ==
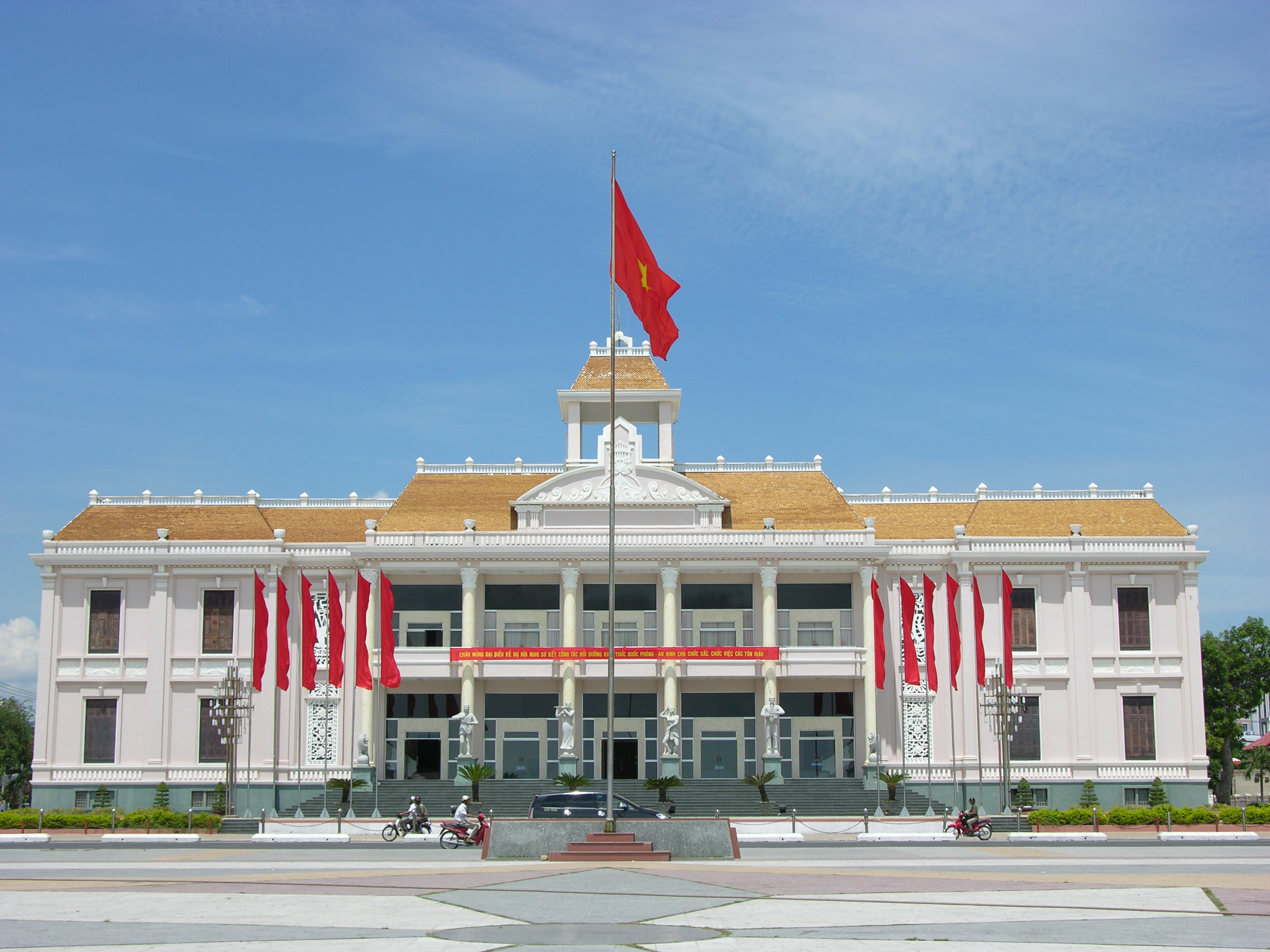
Nha Trang City Hall

Trầm Hương Tower (literally: Agarwood), a city icon

Nha Trang is subdivided into 22 wards and communes, of which 14 are urban wards: Vĩnh Hải, Vĩnh Phước, Vĩnh Thọ, Vạn Thạnh, Phương Sơn, Ngọc Hiệp, Phước Hòa, Tân Tiến (founded in November 2024), Phước Hải, Lộc Thọ, Vĩnh Nguyên, Vĩnh Trường, Phước Long, Vĩnh Hòa; and 8 suburban communes: Vĩnh Phương, Vĩnh Trung, Vĩnh Thạnh, Vĩnh Thái, Vĩnh Hiệp, Vĩnh Ngọc, Vĩnh Lương, and Phước Đồng.

Since 1998, due to the high pace of urbanization, many urban planned zones have been built: Hòn Rớ, Bắc Việt, Thánh Gia, Đường Đệ, and Nam Hòn Khô.

== Education ==
Nha Trang is home to the multidisciplinary Nha Trang University (formerly Nha Trang Fishery University); the Naval and Aviation Academy; a teachers' training college; Khanh Hoa University, as well as the Nha Trang Oceanography Institute a unique institute of oceanography in Vietnam and the Pasteur Institute of Nha Trang, one of the many famous Pasteur Institutes.

=== Nha Trang Pasteur Institute ===
The French-Swiss bacteriologist Alexandre Yersin, discoverer of the Yersinia pestis bacterium lived in Nha Trang for 50 years and was affectionately known as Ông Năm. He established the Indochinese Pasteur Institute (now known as the Pasteur Institute of Nha Trang), devoted to researching the bubonic plague. Yersin died in Nha Trang on 1 March 1943. A street in the city is named after him, and a shrine has been built over his tomb. There is a Yersin Museum dedicated to his achievements.

== Economy ==
Nha Trang's economy relies largely on tourism. In the suburban areas around the city, the shipbuilding industry has developed and contributed significantly to the local economy. Fishery and services are also important to the city. Khanh Hoa Province in general and Nha Trang is particular are among the largest contributors to Vietnam's annual budget revenues. Lobster farming on the sea is an important industry for the people living in suburban areas.

To the south of the city, by Cam Ranh Bay, several industrial parks are under construction and have been partly available for investors. Once the construction of the deep-water port on Vân Phong Bay has been completed, this area will become the third important economic zone in the province (besides Nha Trang and Cam Ranh).

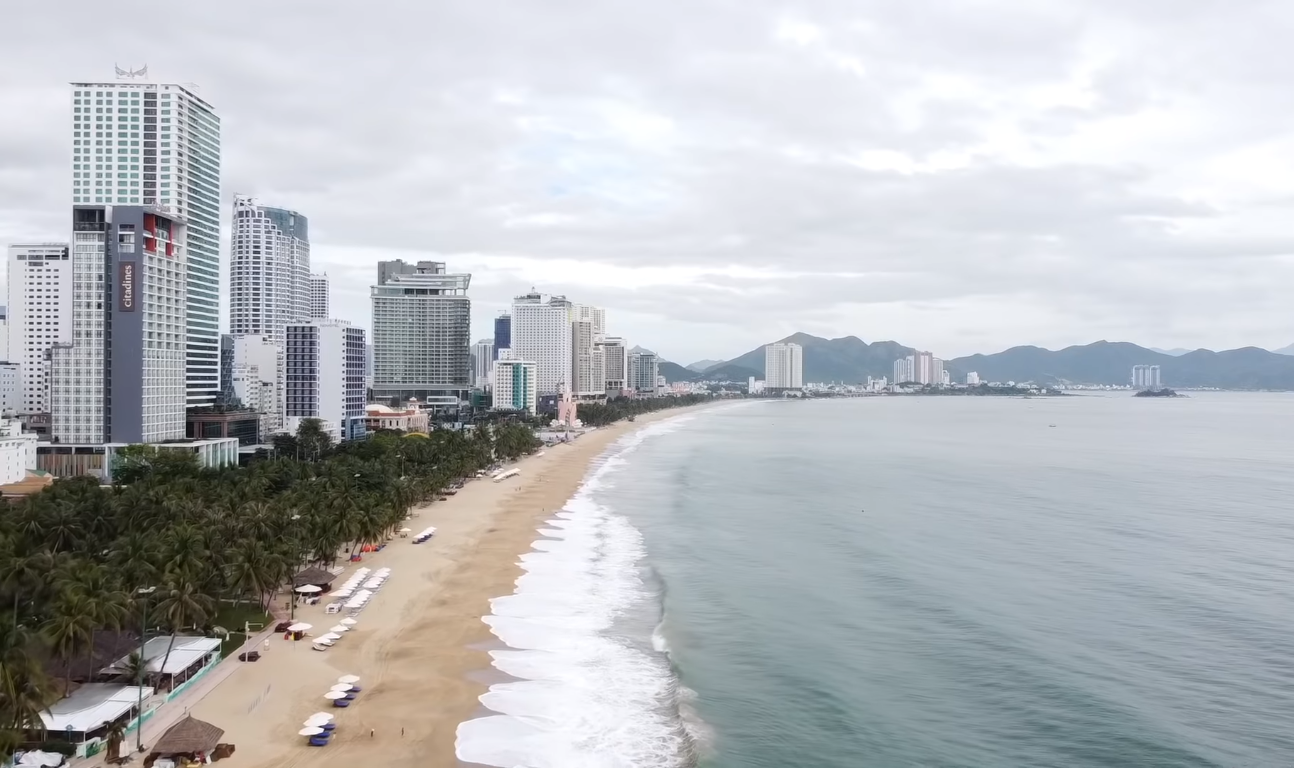
Coastline of Nha Trang in December 2020.

=== Tourism ===
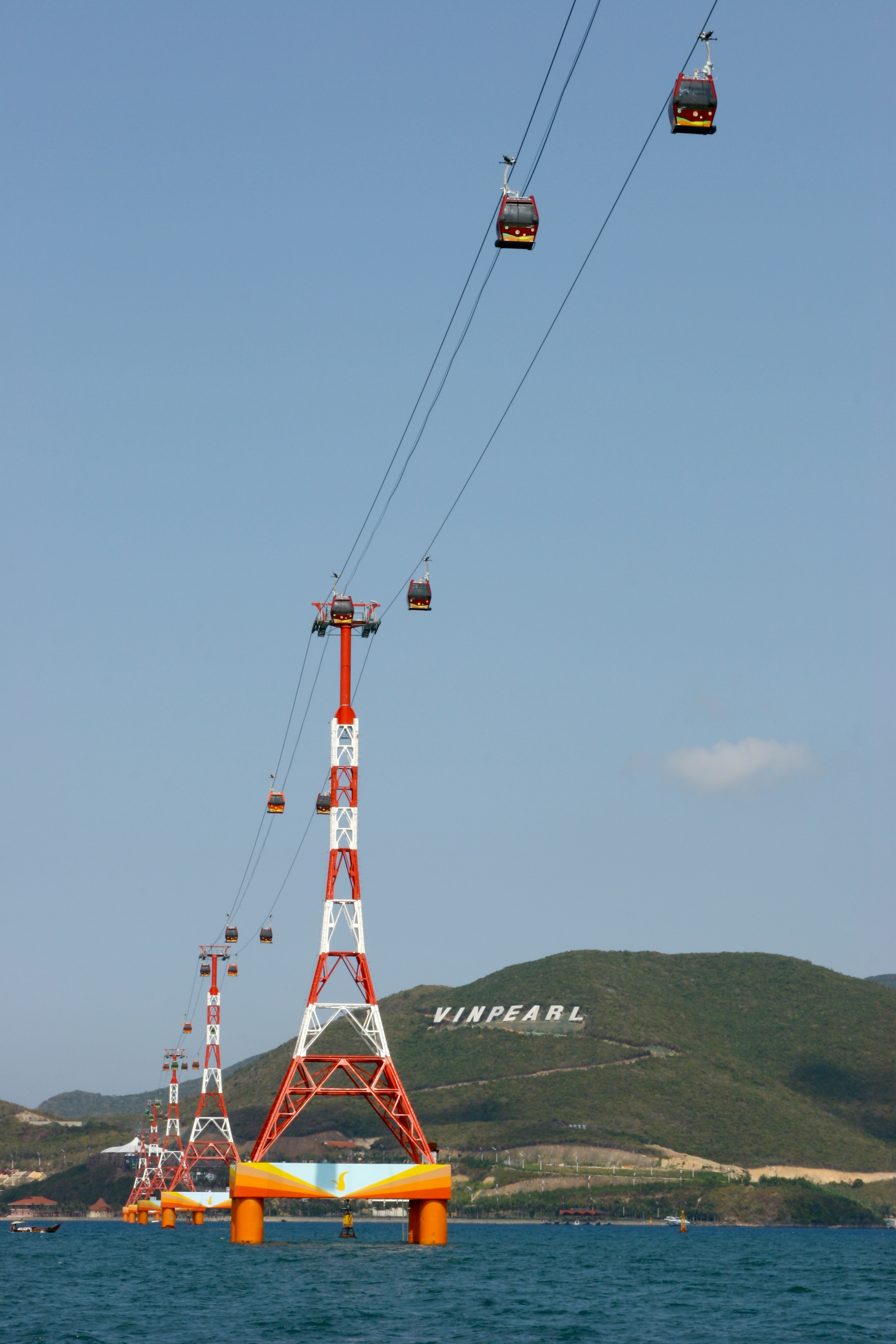
Vinpearl Cable Car

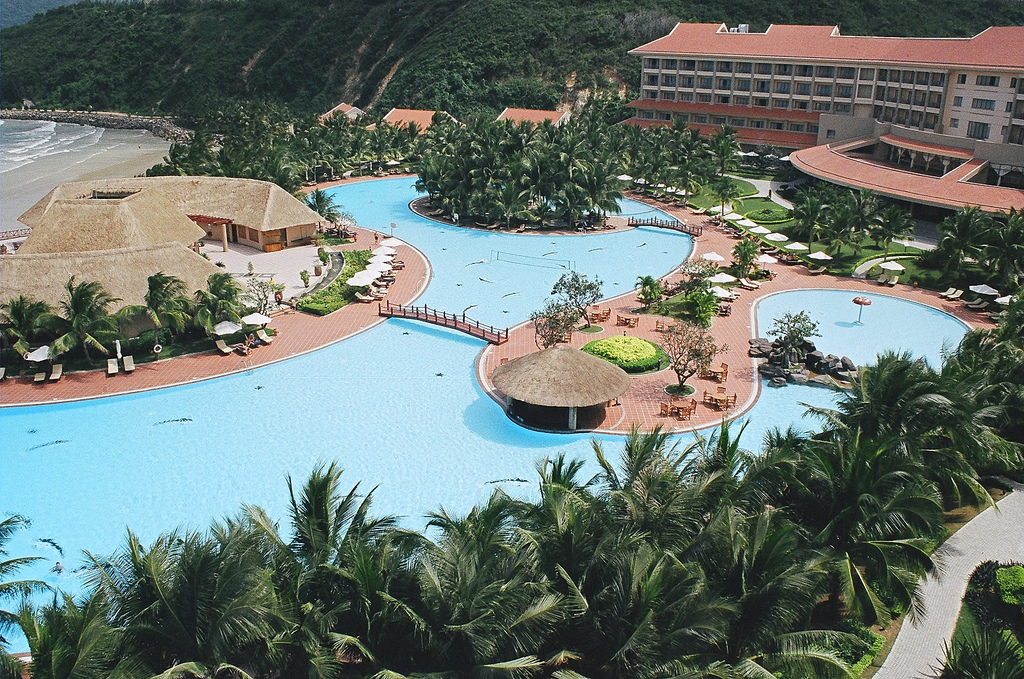
Vinpearl Resort & Spa

Nha Trang Bay

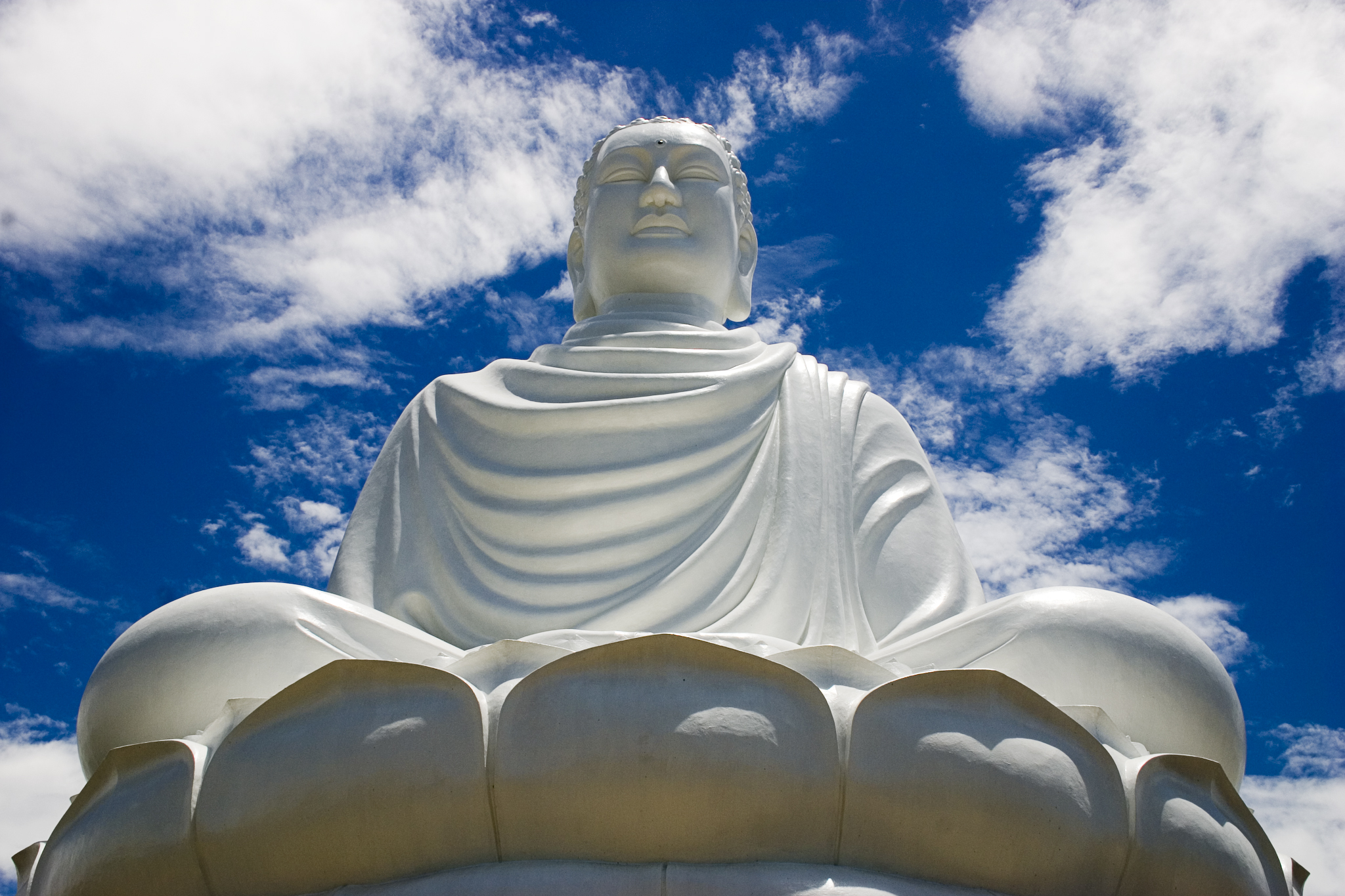
A Buddha statue

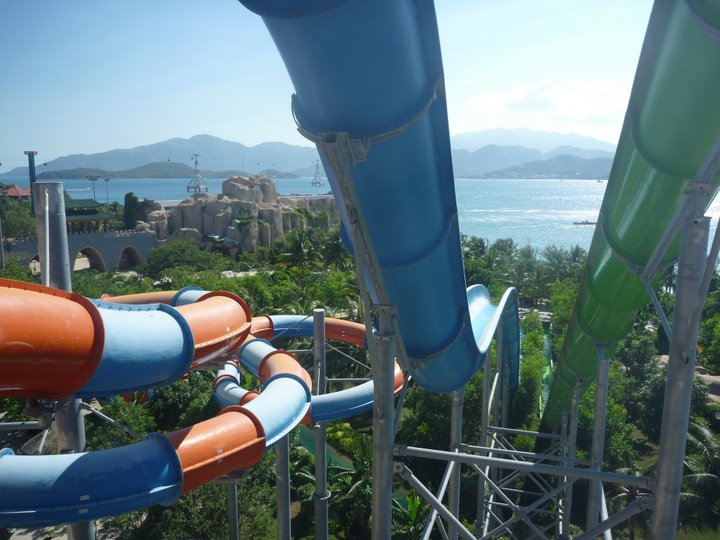
Vinpearl waterpark

Nha Trang is one of the most important tourist hubs of Vietnam, thanks to its beaches with fine and clean sand and the clear ocean water with mild temperatures all year round. There are several resorts — such as Vinpearl, Diamond Bay and Ana Mandara — and amusement and water parks, in the city and on islands off the coast. The possibly most beautiful street of Nha Trang is Tran Phu Street along the seaside, sometimes referred to as the North-South Expressway East of Vietnam.

Lying off Nha Trang is the Hon Tre Island (Bamboo Island), with a major resort operated by the Vinpearl Group. The Vinpearl Cable Car, a gondola lift system, links the mainland to the five-star resort and theme park on Hon Tre Island.

Nha Trang is a stopover for annual yacht races starting in Hong Kong. In recent years, the city has welcomed many five-star sea cruises. In addition to sailboat racing, Nha Trang provides a rich variety of tourist activities for visitors. Island hopping, scuba diving, water sports and other sporting activities can be enjoyed. The Nha Trang Tourist Information Center (a non-governmental organisation), located near the Cho Dam Market has been set up to provide information for visitors.

The local cuisine is most famous for fresh seafood and barbecued pork rolled in rice paper. especially nem nướng Nha Trang, a signature dish of the region. Other notable specialties include bún chả cá (fish cake noodle soup), bánh căn, bánh xèo, and gỏi cá mai.

The area's bird's nest soup is deemed one of the best in Vietnam. Bird's nests are collected in the wild, on bird farms on the islands off the coast and even in some houses in the inner city. The farmed bird in question belongs to the swiftlet group, popularly referred to as yến hàng (Aerodramus fuciphagus and A. germani).

=== Tourist attractions ===
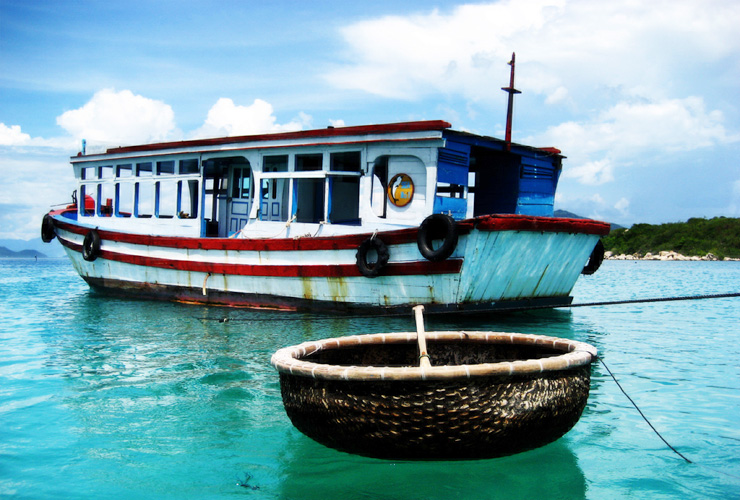
A popular fishery boat and a round bamboo coracle in Nha Trang

Scuba diving and kite boarding are available, as are catamaran sailboats. Winds are steady.

- Alexandre Yersin Museum
- Pasteur Institute of Nha Trang
- Nha Trang Oceanography Institute, the largest of its kind in Indochina where thousands of oceanic life samples, exhibits are on display. It is home to the largest oceanic library in Vietnam.
- Chánh Tọa Church (or Mountain Church)
- Long Son Pagoda, and its statue of Gautama Buddha.
- Tong Lam Lo Son Pagoda, and its statue of Amitabha Buddha.
- Magical Mystery Tour Nha Trang
- Boat tour on Cai River, visiting islands off the coast and Ba Hồ Waterfall
- Palace of Emperor Bảo Đại
- Thap Ba Hot Spring (Lady Tower hot spring)
- Nha Phu Lagoon
- Hoa Lan Stream (Orchid Flower stream)
- Monkey Island
- Sạn Beach
- Hòn Tằm Island (Silkworm island)
- Hòn Mun Island (Ebony island)
- Hòn Con Sẻ Tre Island (Bamboo Sparrow island)
- Hòn Ông Island
- Đảo Yến Island (Swiftlet island)
- Hòn Tre Island (Bamboo island)
- Suối Đổ Stream
- Suối Tiên Stream (Fairy stream)
- Hòn Bà Mountain
- Cai River Minigolf & Restaurant & Marina
- Yangbay Waterfall
- Tháp Bà Pô Nagar Nha Trang (a Champa Tower)
- Chùa Long Sơn (Long Son Pagoda, literally "The Dragon Mountain Pagoda" — or White Buddha Pagoda)
- Trí Nguyên Aquarium (an aquarium where hundreds of rare oceanic species are fed)
- Vinpearl Cable Car
- Tháp Trầm Hương (symbol of Nha Trang City)
- Trần Phú Walking Street
- Vân Phong Bay
- Nha Trang Stone Church

== Culture ==
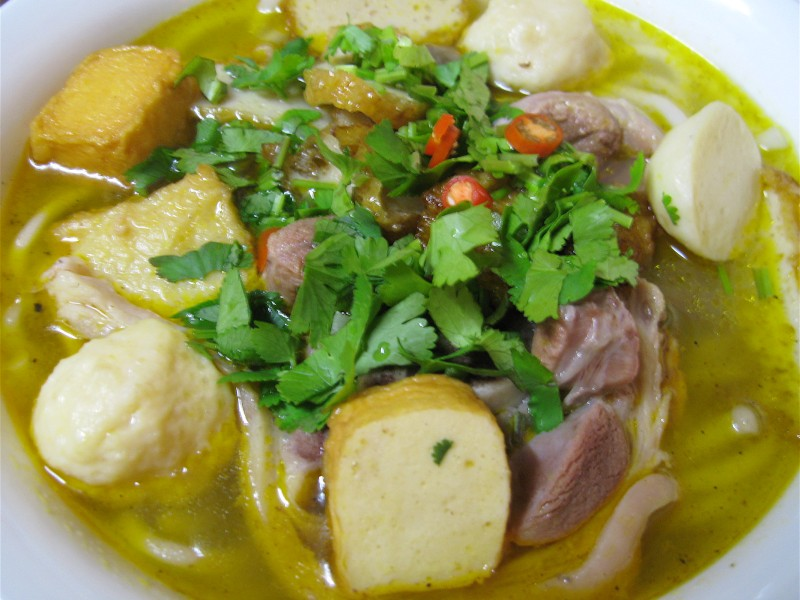
Banh canh noodle soup

=== Cuisine ===
Nha Trang cuisine, originating from the coastal city of Nha Trang in Khánh Hòa Province, is strongly shaped by the region’s marine environment and long-standing fishing traditions. The dishes are made with fresh seafood and light cooking methods that highlight natural flavors. Signature local foods include bún cá sứa, bún cá chả cá, nem nướng Nha Trang, gỏi cá trích, gỏi cá mai, bánh căn and bánh canh chả cá.

== Transportation ==
When Cam Ranh Bay used to be an important naval base, Nha Trang Airport was the main airport of the city. This airport was used by the United States Air Force and Republic of Vietnam Air Force during the Vietnam War. When part of Cam Ranh Bay was made an economic development zone by the Vietnamese government, Cam Ranh International Airport (also a military airport built by the United States during Vietnam War) was made the new civilian airport of the city. This airport is located by Cam Ranh Bay, 28 km (17 mi) south of the city and was (as of 2007) the fourth busiest airport in passenger traffic in Vietnam serving more than 683,000 passengers in 2008. As of 2016, the airport has domestic connections to Hanoi, Hồ Chí Minh City, Hải Phòng, Đà Nẵng, and Vinh. The airport also provides direct international flights to Seoul, Moscow, Kuala Lumpur, Bangkok and Hong Kong.

The city is next to the National Route 1, the backbone north–south road of the country. The Reunification Railway crosses the city and stops at Nha Trang Railway Station. The construction work of Vân Phong Port, north of the city, a deep-water project capable of handling ships up to 100,000 tonnes, and with a capacity of 100 million tonnes of cargo per annum, is under progress by a consortium of Japanese corporations. The estimated investment capital for this port-city complex project is expected to reach US$15 billion.

== Gallery ==
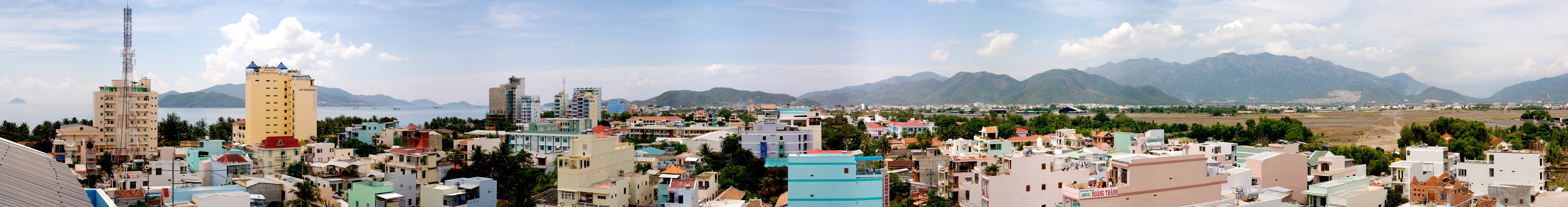
Nha Trang coastal city viewed from above

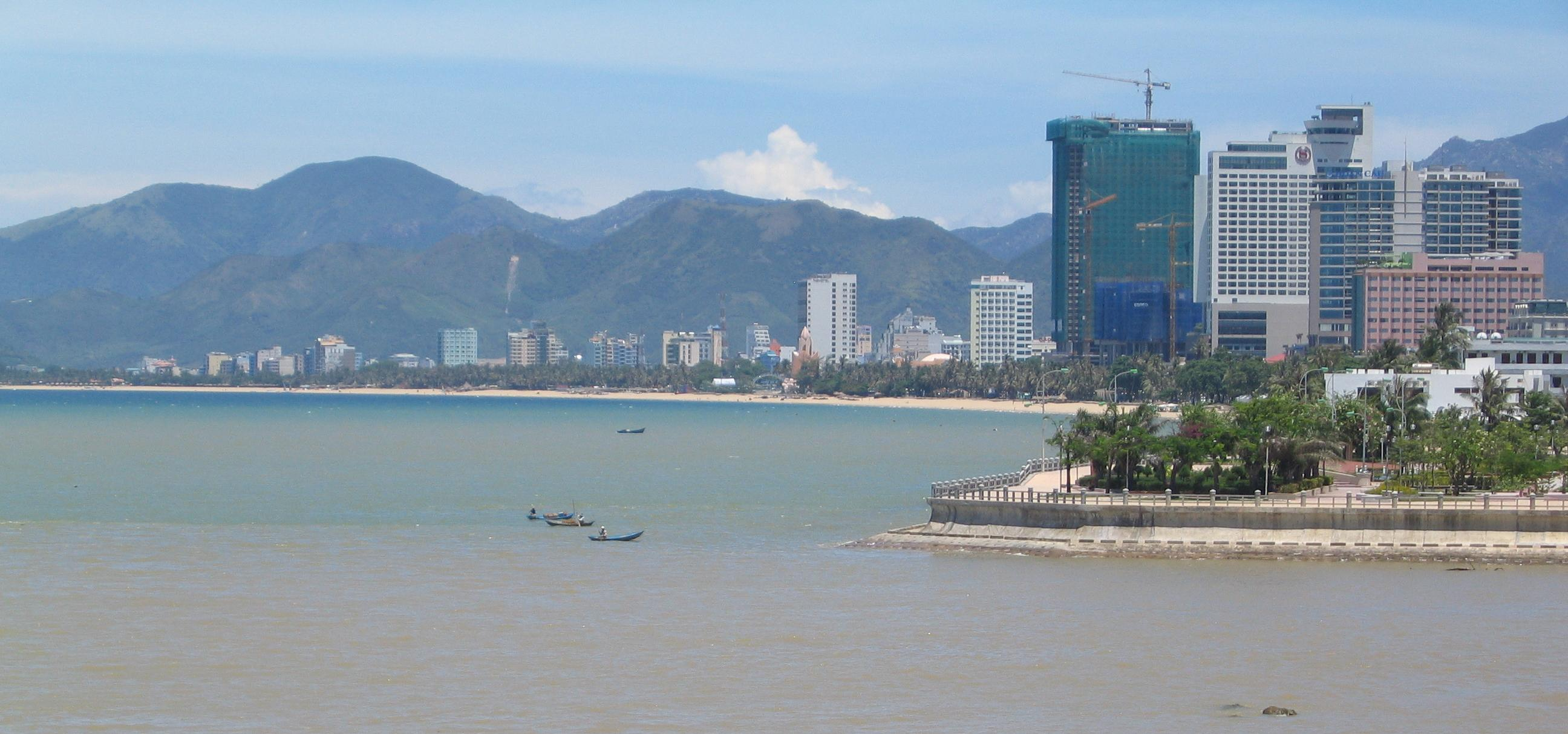
Nha Trang's skyline

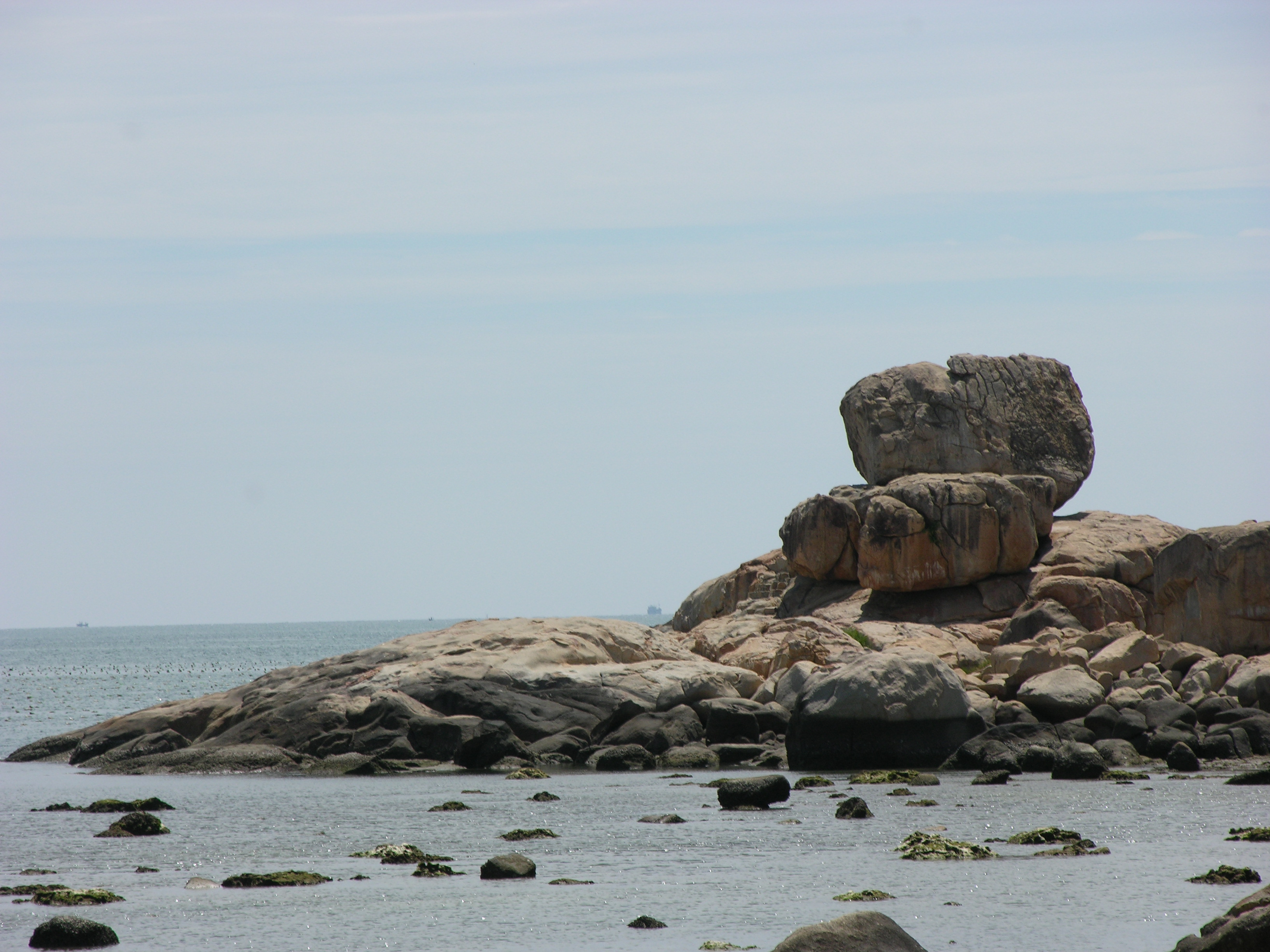
Hon Chong rocks

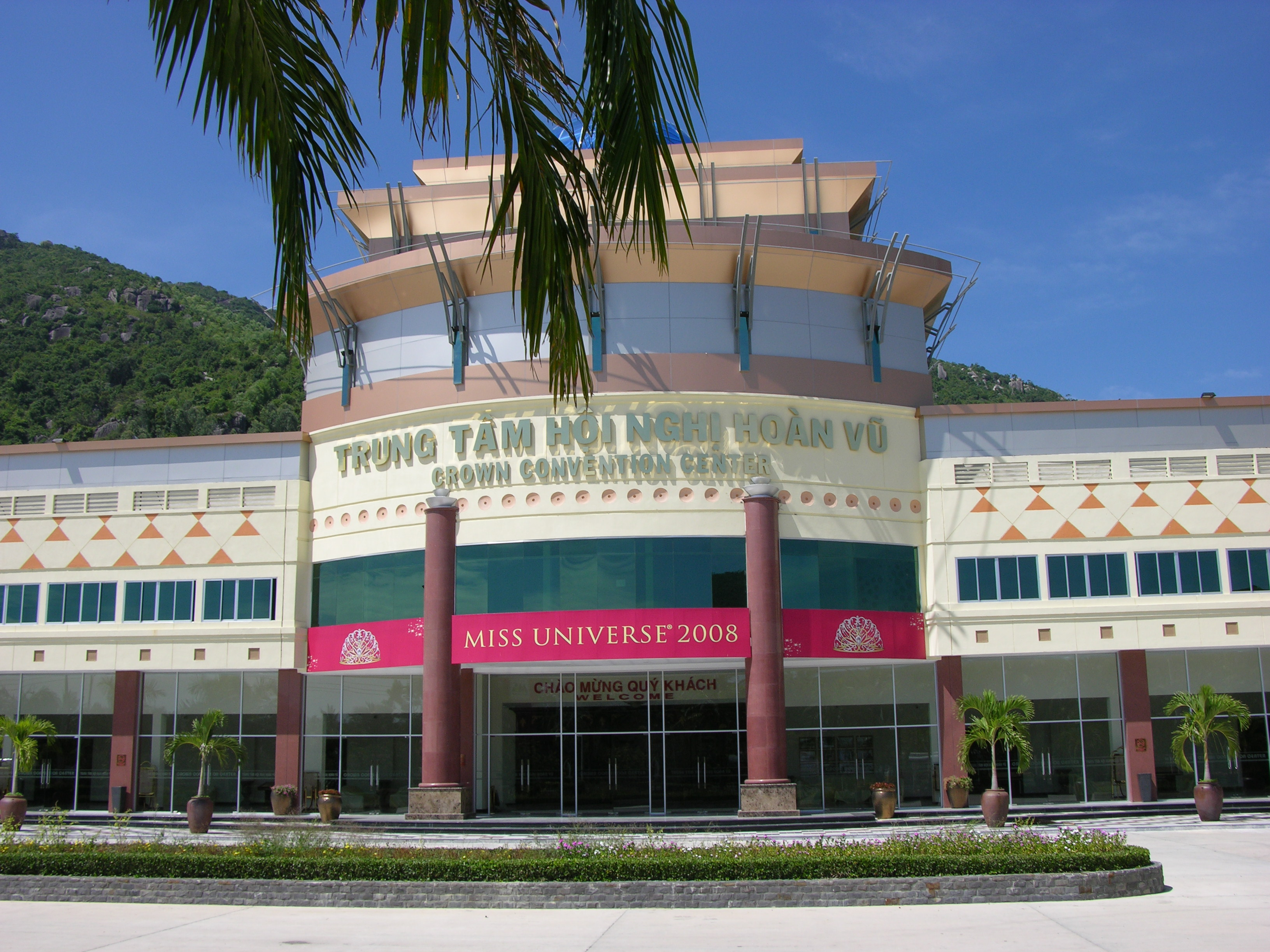
The official venue of Miss Universe 2008 pageant

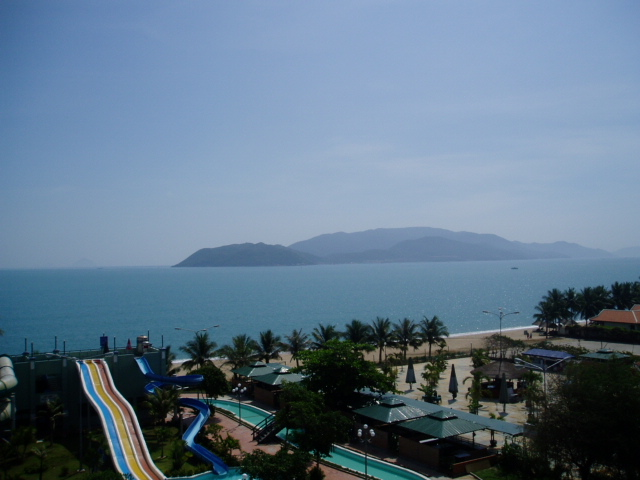
Nha Trang Bay

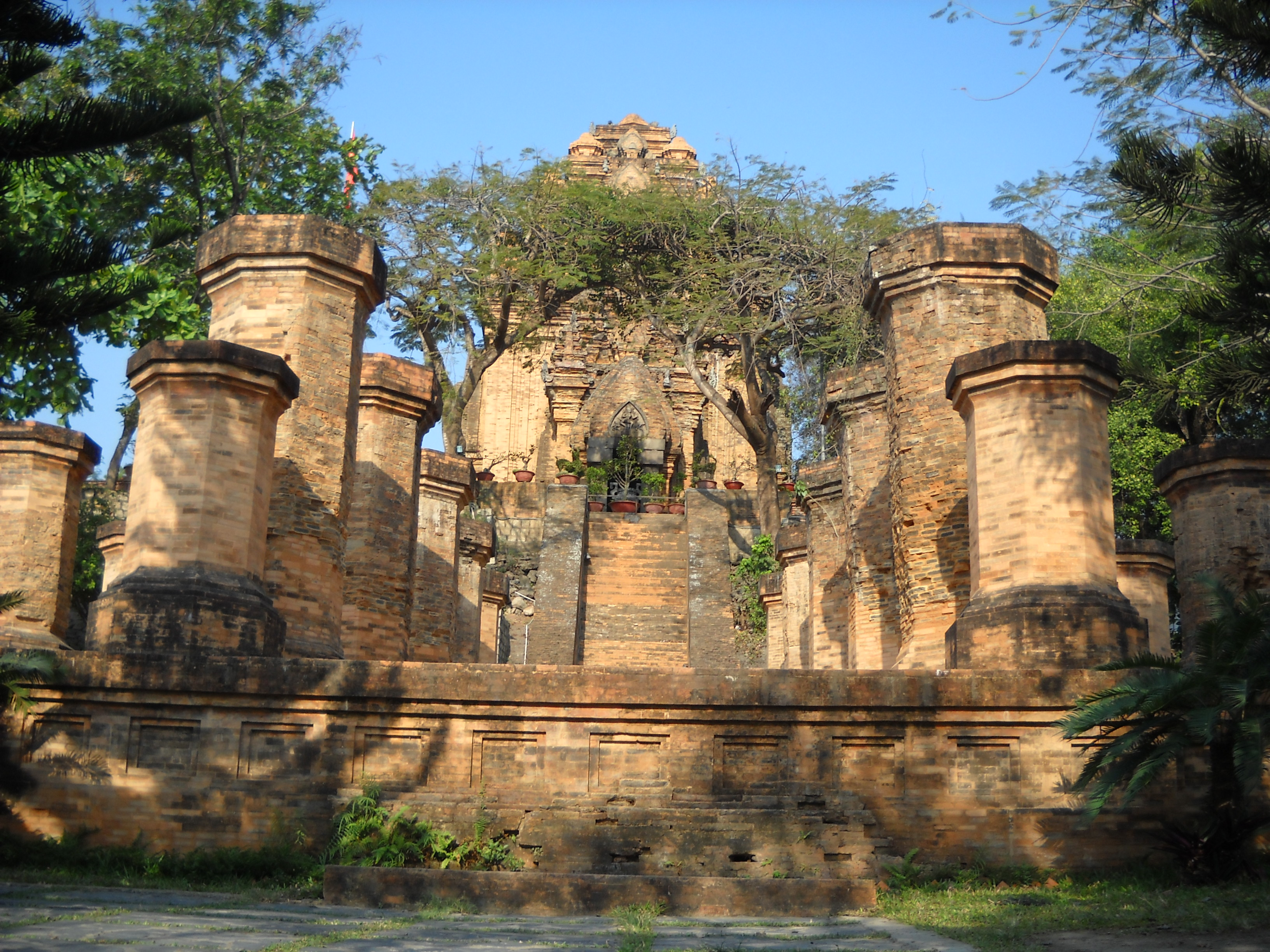
Another view at Po Nagar temple

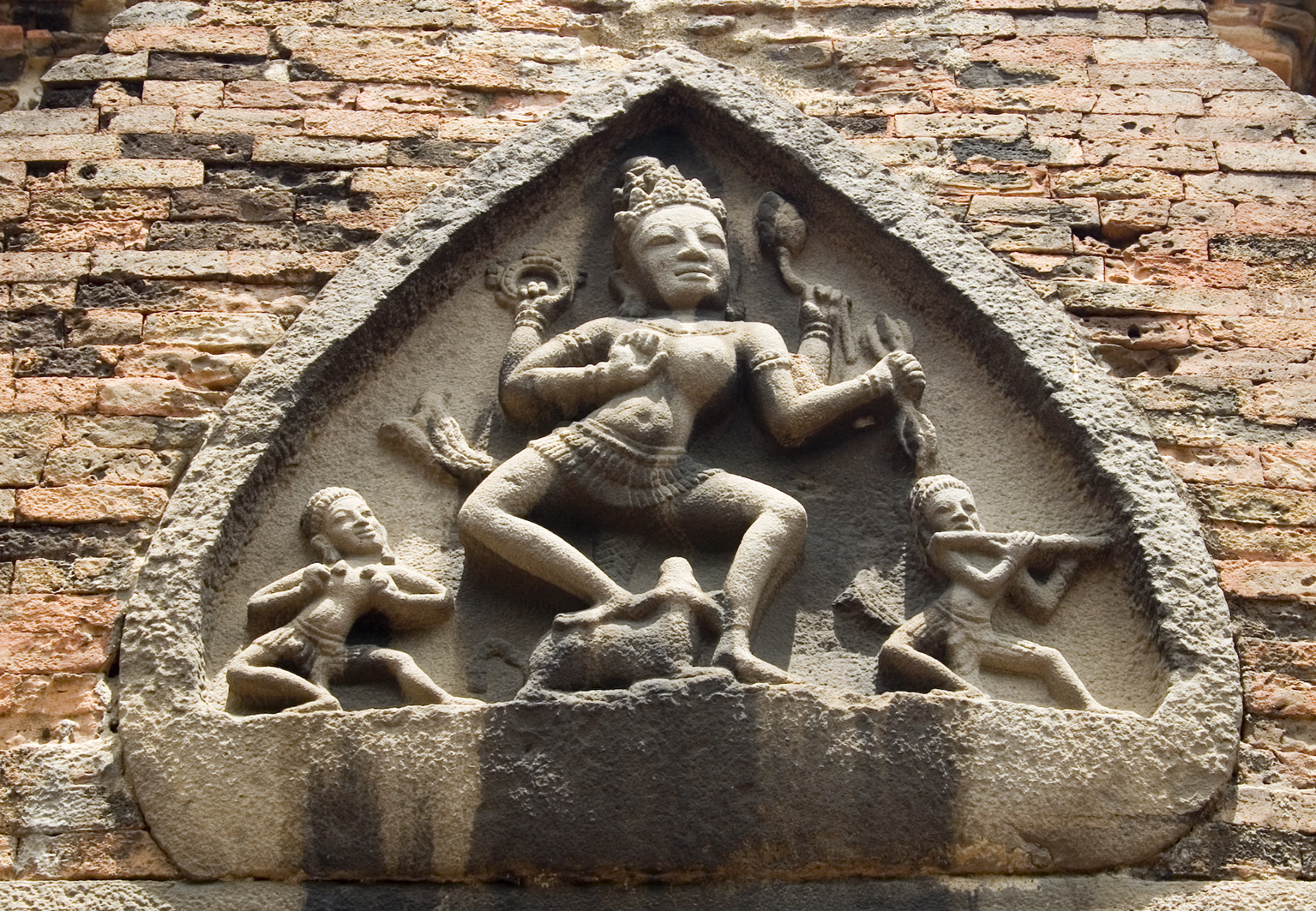
A Durga ornament

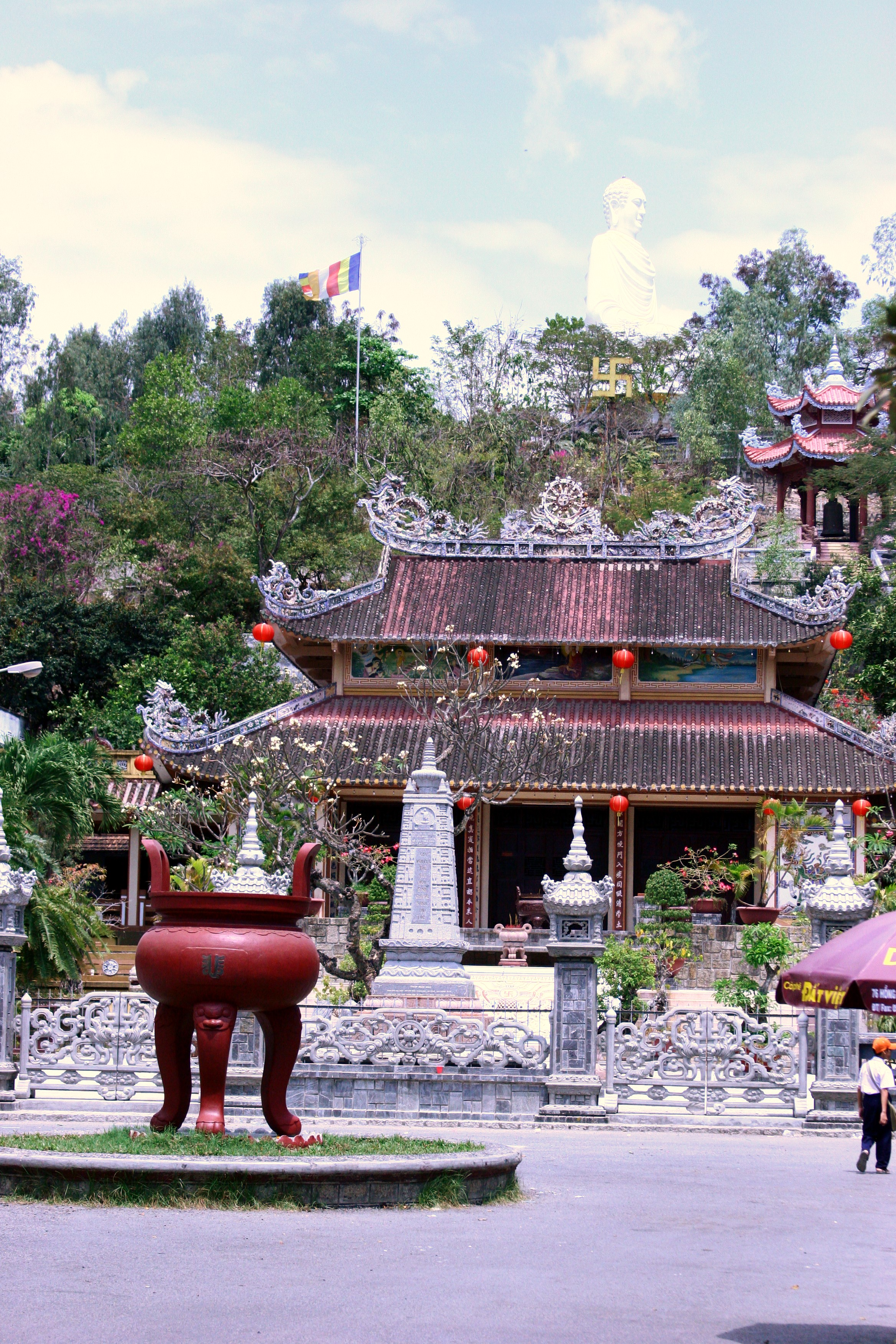
Long Son pagoda

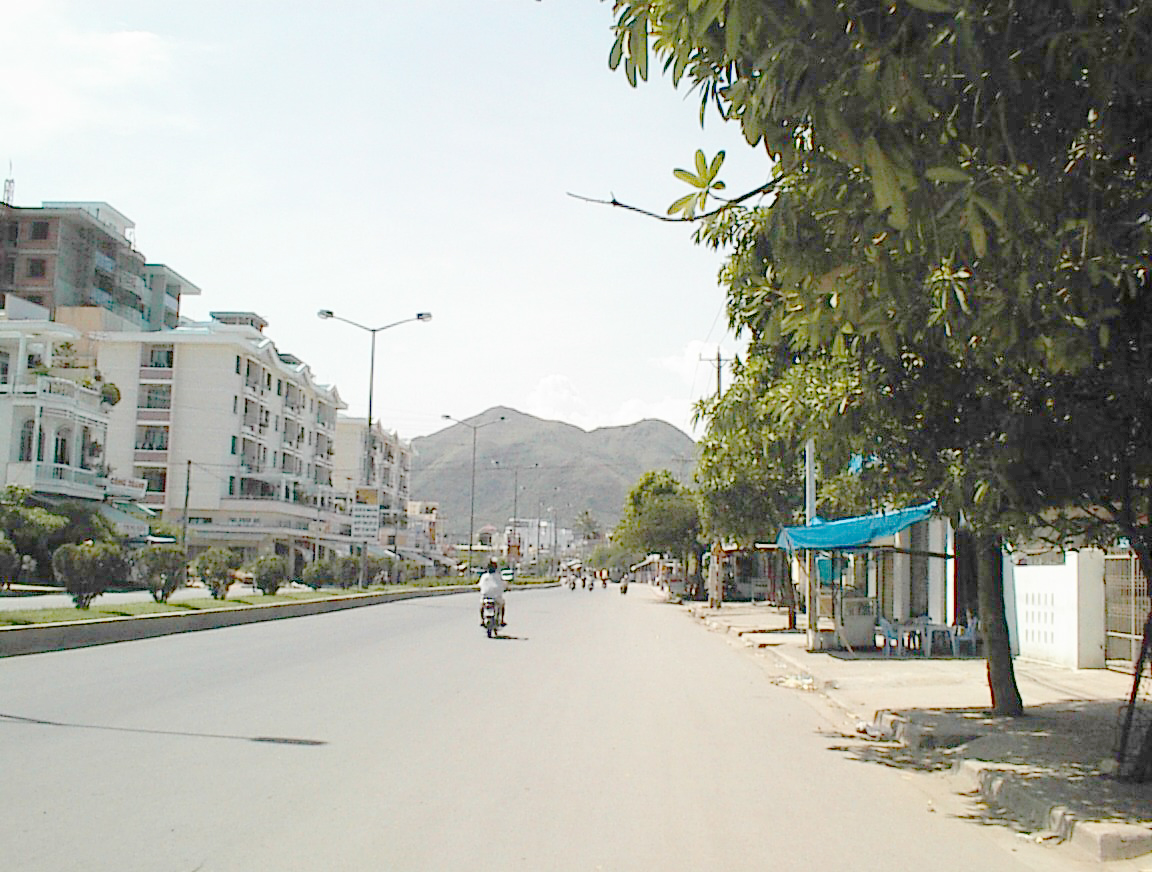
A typical street in Nha Trang City

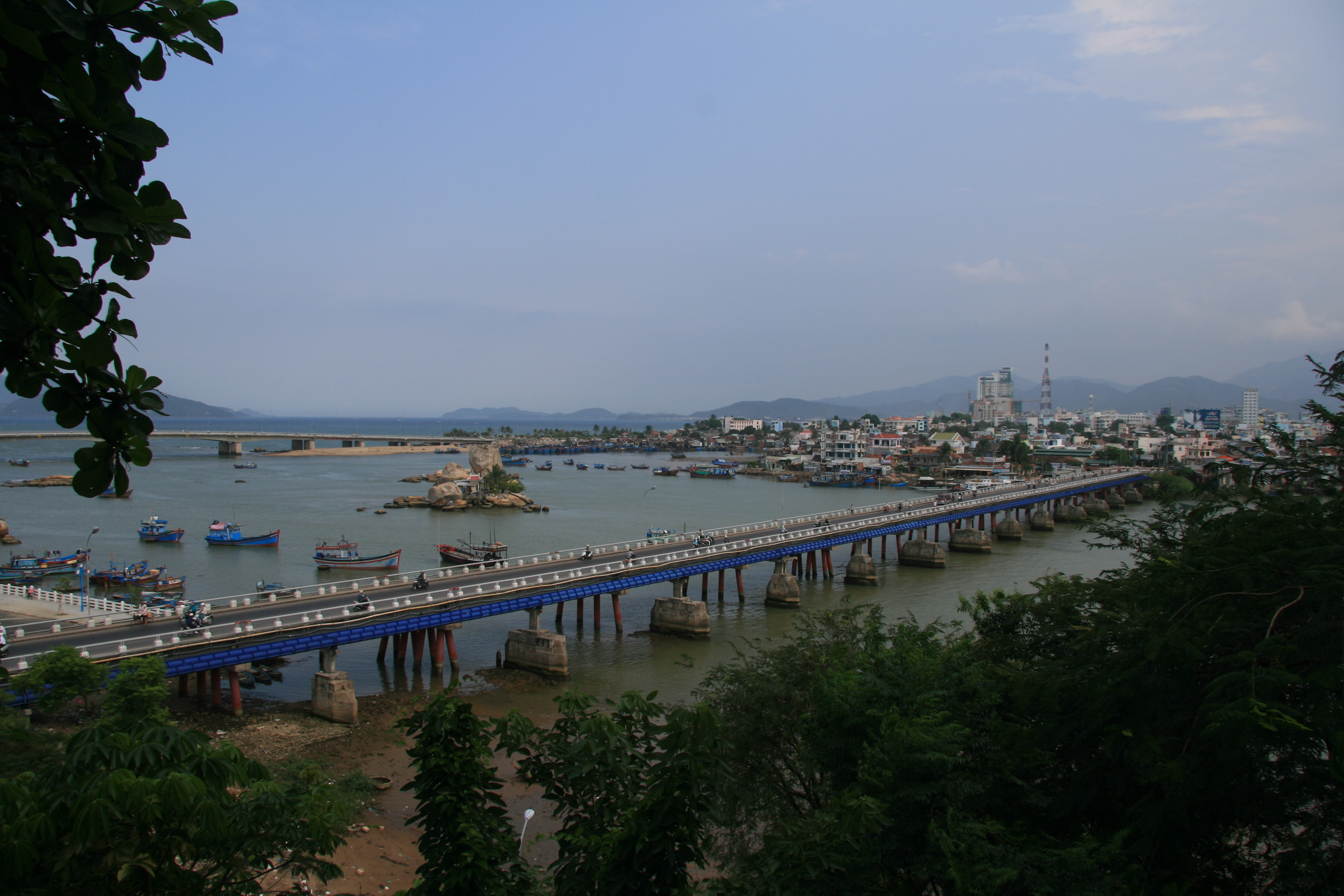
Xóm Bóng Bridges (1975–2022)

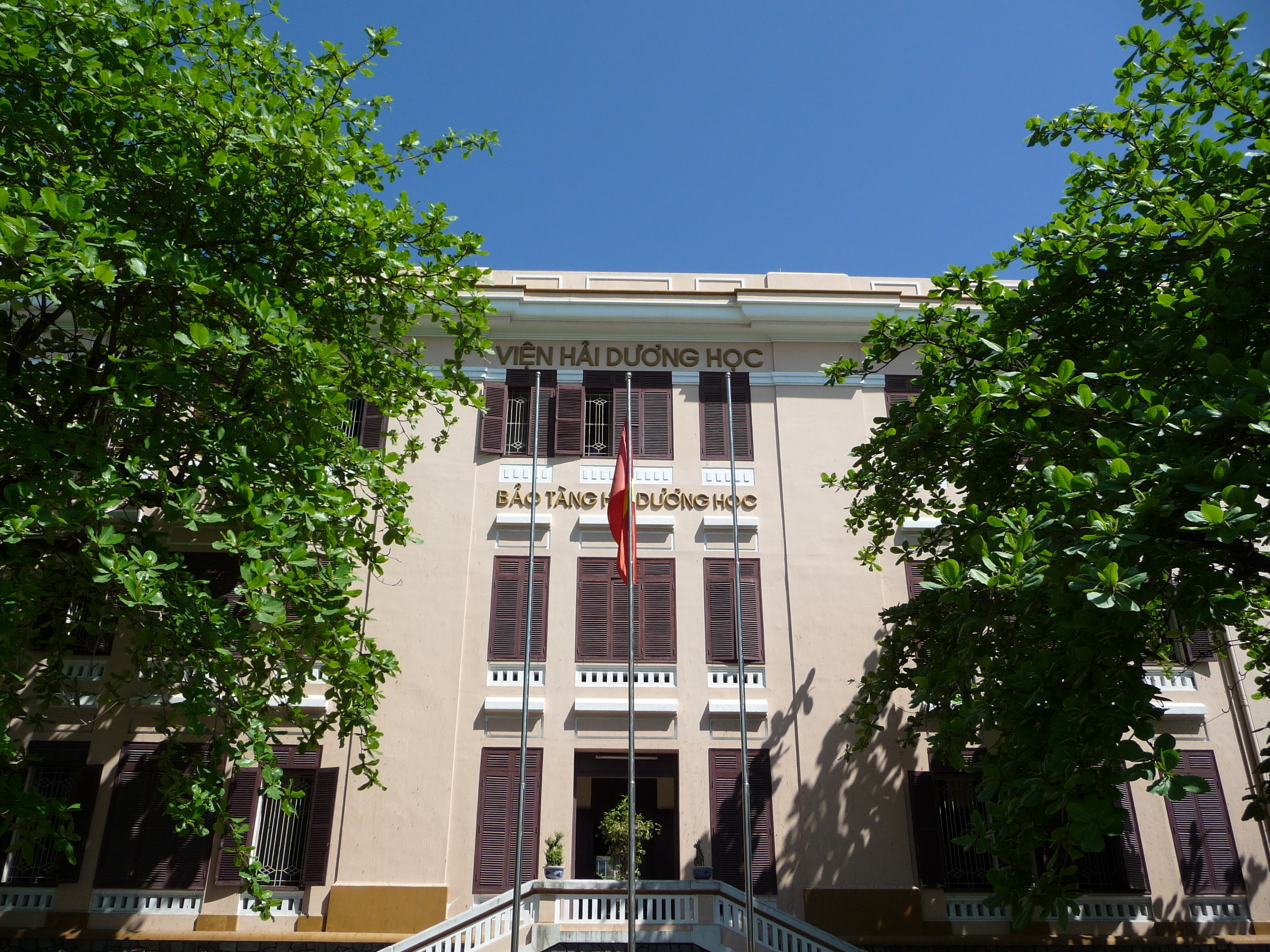
Oceanographic Institute

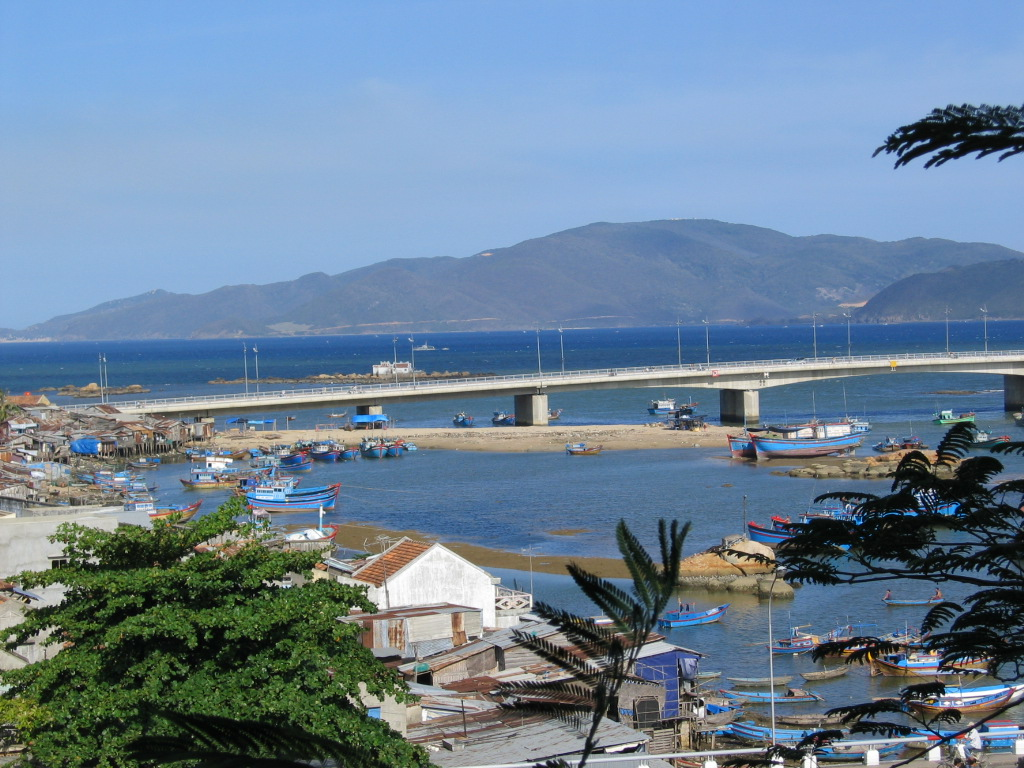
Another view

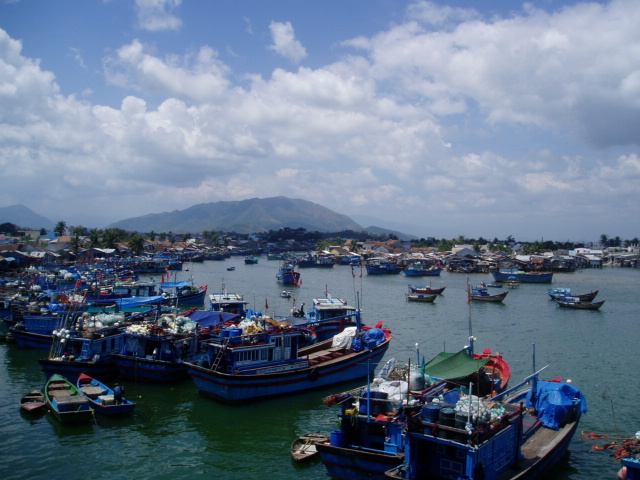
The fishing harbour

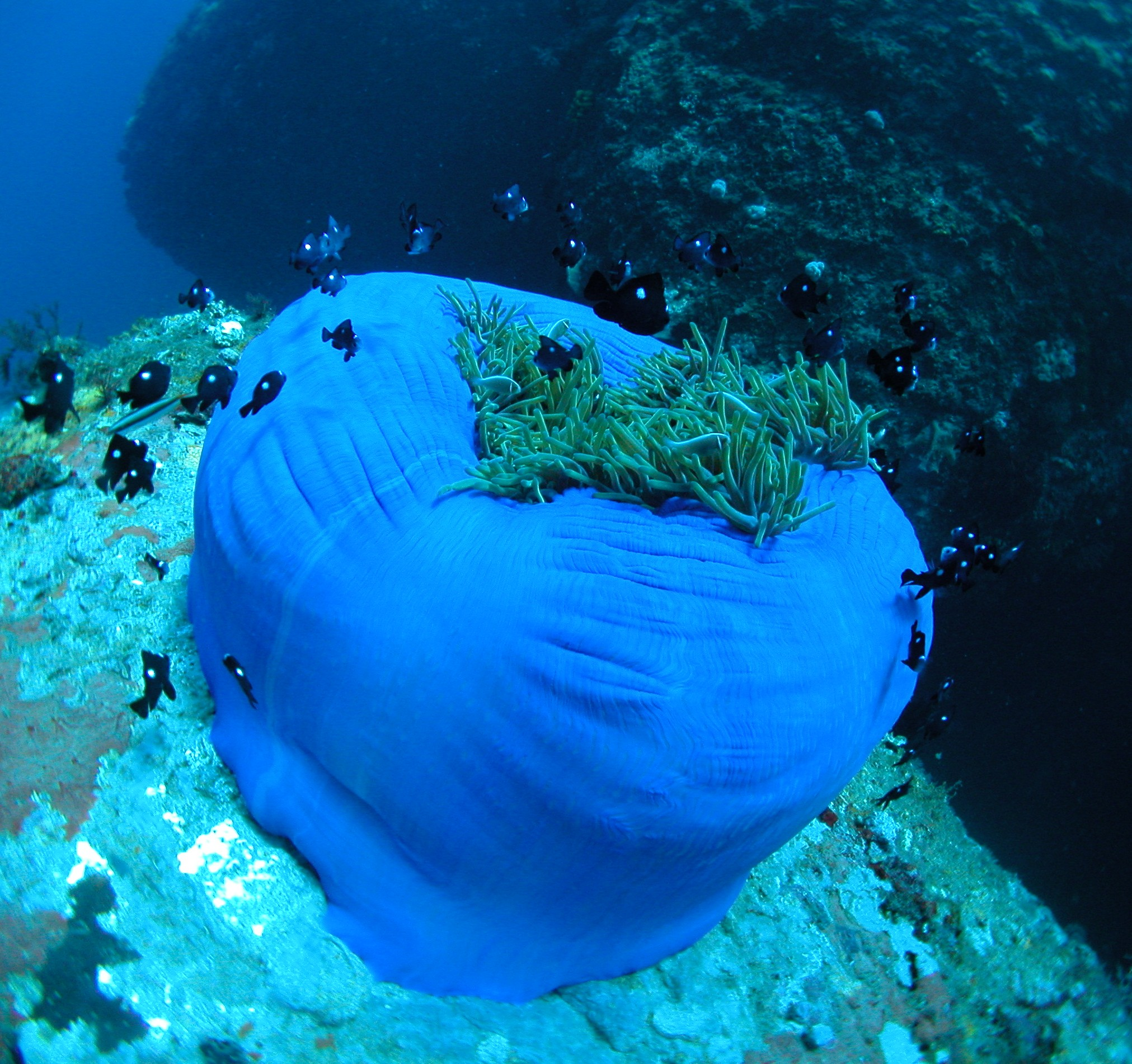
Sea anemone

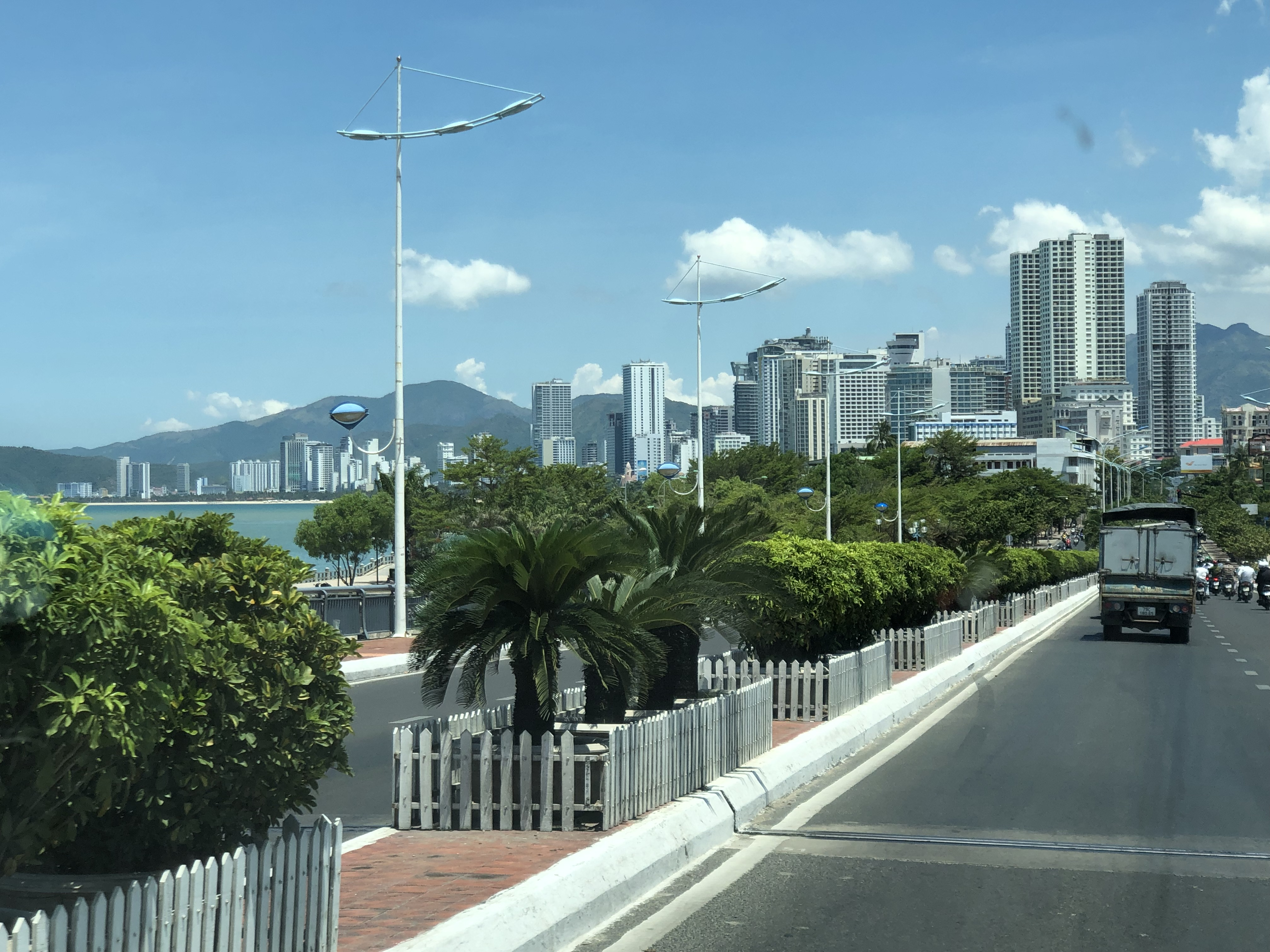
The center of Nha Trang city

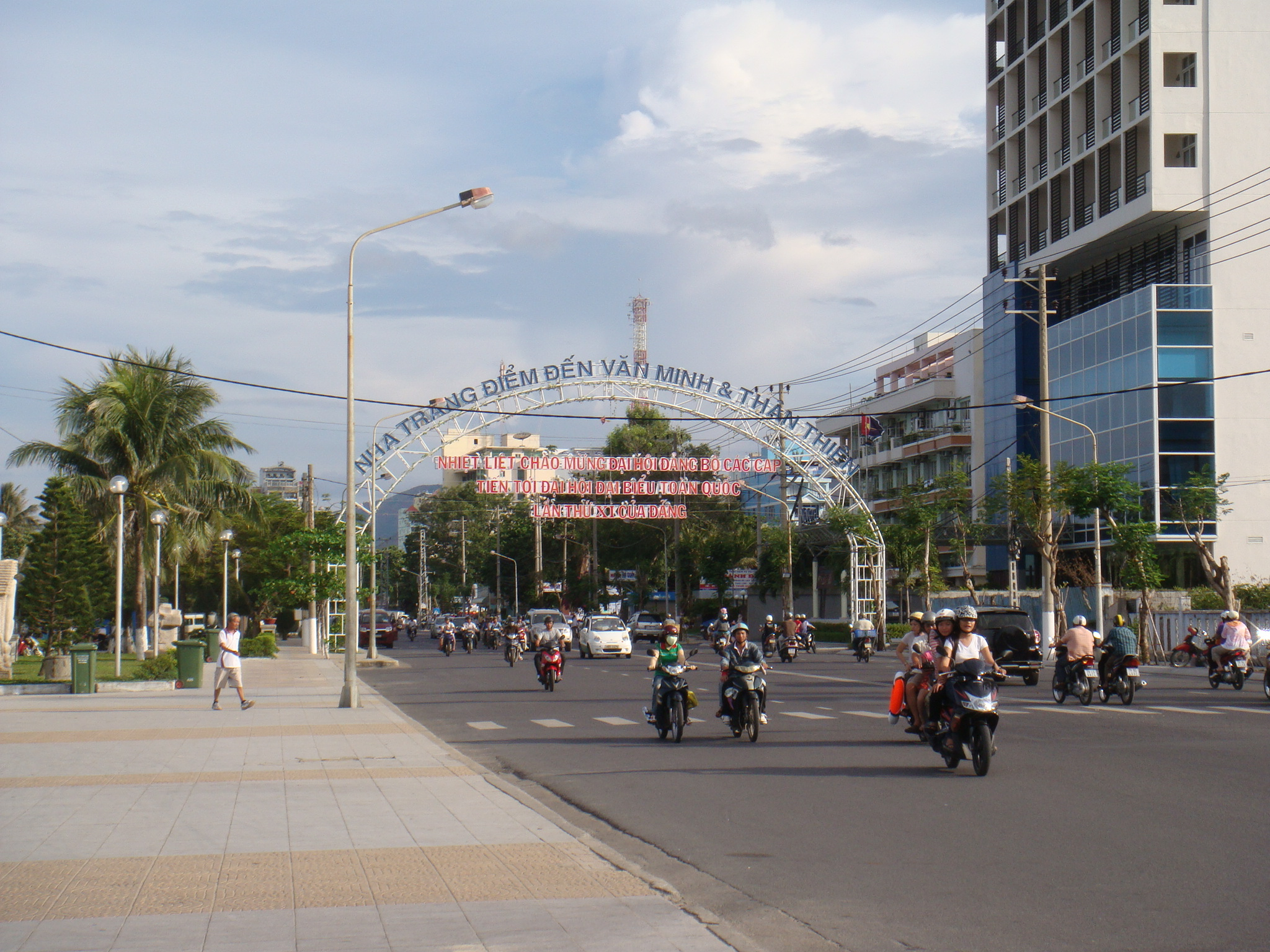
Street Nha Trang

== See also ==
- Entovalva nhatrangensis

Preceded by Auditorio Nacional; Mexico City, Mexico	Miss Universe; Venue; 2008	Succeeded by Atlantis Paradise Island; Nassau, Bahamas

Preceded by Boracay Convention Center; Boracay, Philippines	Miss Earth; Venue; 2010	Succeeded by University of the Philippines Theater; Quezon City, Philippines
