= Vân Phong Port =

Coordinates: 12.671°N 109.278°E

- Click on the map for a fullscreen view

Location
- Country: Vietnam
- Location: Khánh Hòa

Vân Phong Port is a deep-water port planned for development in Van Phong Bay, north of Nha Trang, Khánh Hòa Province, Vietnam. Vân Phong Bay has a natural average depth of 22 to 27 metres and is naturally protected by the Hòn Gốm Peninsula.

The first stage of construction started in September 2009 and includes two piers that will be capable of handling ships of up to 9,000 TEU and a draught of 16.5 metres. Later stages of construction will include facilities to receive largest container ships of 15,000 TEU and more.

Construction of the port was suspended in May 2011 with no indication of a resumption date. News reports indicate that it has been difficult to mobilise capital for the project and unforeseen geological issues caused faults in the pile design. To date, only six per cent of the total number of piles have been completed.
