= Pasteur Institute of Nha Trang =

Medical research institute in Vietnam

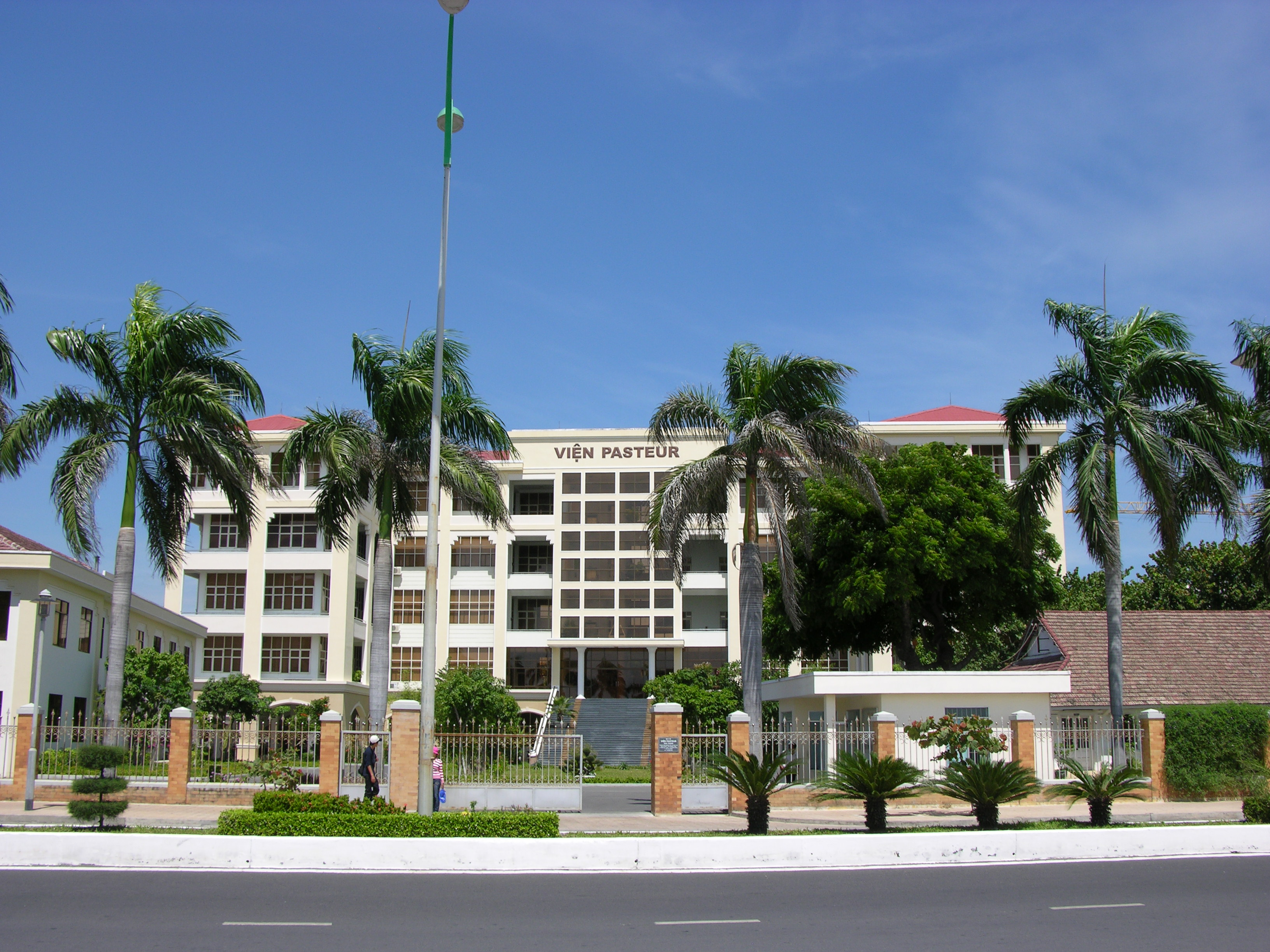
- Front of the institute
- Established: 1895 (131 years ago)
- Head: Dr Đỗ Thái Hùng
- Address: 06-08-10 Trần Phú st., Nha Trang ward
- Location: Khánh Hòa Province, Vietnam
- Coordinates: 12.2521546°N 109.1962466°E
- Interactive map of Pasteur Institute of Nha Trang
- Website: www.pasteur-nhatrang.org.vn

The Pasteur Institute of Nha Trang (French: Institut Pasteur de Nha Trang, Vietnamese: Viện Pasteur Nha Trang) is one of two Institut Pasteur in Vietnam. Located in Nha Trang, it was established during the French colonization of Vietnam. It operates directly under the authority of the Vietnamese Ministry of Health.

== Early history ==
Established by Alexandre Yersin in 1895, it specialized in the study of animal disease, their prophylaxis and treatment. Yersin bought a 500 hectare property in Suoi Giao (about 20 km outside Nha Trang) on which to raise 600 goats, sheep, cattle and water buffalo, all needed for research at the institute. The property was cleared by Yersin and his coolies, and they built stables for the research animals. Yersin hung a bell around the neck of each animal to keep local tigers from attacking them. Within a few years, veterinarians joined the researchers at the institute and developed an anti-plague serum for human use and several serum for use in cattle.

In the first few years, Yersin and his team studied most of the local diseases commonly found in animals in Indochina, developing treatments and making them available to the local populace.

The research was expensive; despite government subsidies and donations, he would have to find a local source of financing. Yersin introduced rubber trees (Hevea brasiliensis) to the property. The first crop planted in 1898 gave a latex harvest in 1904 (this was sold to the local Michelin producer). The rubber crop helped support the institute’s activities. (This property was bequeathed to the Nha Trang Institute after his death.)

Ten years after the introduction of the rubber plants, Yersin introduced Cinchona plants for the production of quinine. His effort would take 20 years to give favourable results. After his death, Yersin was buried on the Suoi Giao property.

An epidemic of plague came to Nha Trang in 1898 and was one of the first diseases studied at the institute. The Nha Trang facilities were placed under the supervision of the Pasteur Institute in Paris in 1904 and Yersin assumed the leadership of the facility that same year.

== Later history ==
After the reunification of Vietnam in 1975, the Nha Trang facility was made into a provincial hygiene institute by the government.

In 1990, Nha Trang rejoined the family of worldwide Pasteur Institutes. In 1992, scientists from Nha Trang traveled to Paris to study at the Pasteur Institute. In 1997, a museum dedicated to Alexandre Yersin was opened in Nha Trang, attracting many tourists.

The institute is still conducting medical research.
