= Vinpearl Cable Car =

Cable car over the sea in Vietnam

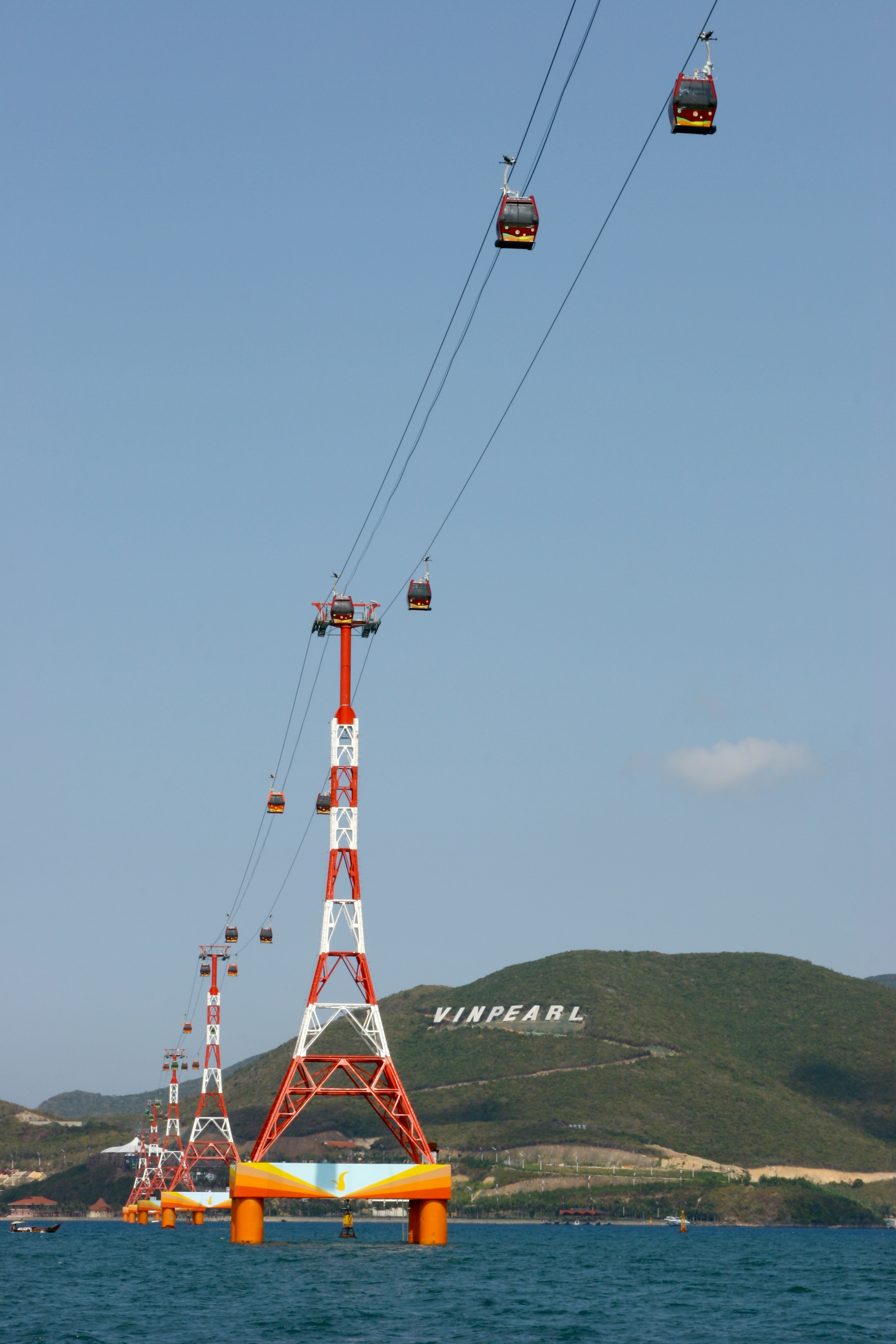

Vinpearl Cable Car is a 3,320-metre-long gondola lift, which links Hon Tre Island with Nha Trang in Vietnam. It has been called the longest cable car over the sea.

It was built by POMA and uses seven offshore support Eiffel- type towers that all stand in the sea. The tallest is 115 metres high, with 40 metres of its structure below the water level. Each tower is supported by 4 steel pipe piles with diameter 2500 mm, filled by reinforced concrete. The length of piles are 74 m to 94 m drilled to the bedrock. The depth of sea water is average 25 m based on the local mean sea level. Currently, the main cable, which was 52 mm stainless steel, has temporarily been removed (as have the gondolas). The structure is designed earthquake resist Mark <= 7 on the Richter scale. The foundations and the towers were constructed by two Vietnamese companies: Foundations : Kim Do Thanh Co., Ltd., Towers : Nam Dong Duong Co., Ltd., Consultant: KPCC, KhanhHoaPublicWorksConsultantCompany. All the project was constructed in 12 months. Total cost 240 billions VN dong. One way runtime is about 15 minutes depending on the wind conditions. Operating hours: Currently out of service.

== Location ==
- Nha Trang Station: 12°12′6.86″N 109°12′53.5″E
- Tower 1: 12°12′10.77″N 109°13′0.77″E
- Tower 2: 12°12′17.83″N 109°13′13.8″E
- Tower 3: 12°12′24.11″N 109°13′25.5″E
- Tower 4: 12°12′31.34″N 109°13′38.9″E
- Tower 5: 12°12′38.4″N 109°13′52″E
- Tower 6: 12°12′45.44″N 109°14′5.23″E
- Tower 7: 12°12′52.14″N 109°14′17.6″E
- Hon-Tre Island Station: 12°12′58.37″N 109°14′29.1″E
