= Nha Trang Oceanography Institute =

Research institute in Vietnam

Institute of Oceanography, Nha Trang
- Viện Hải dương học
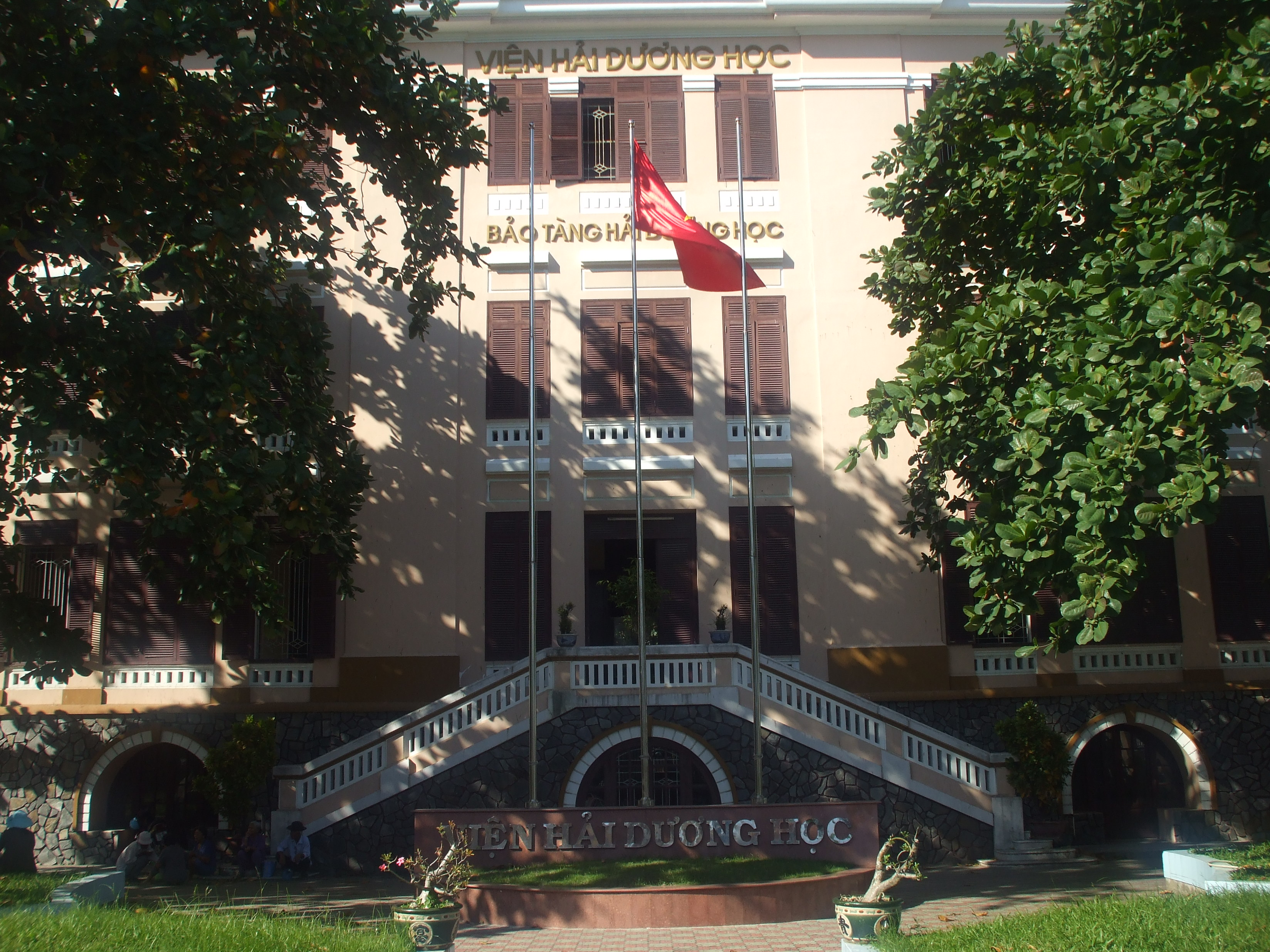
- Formation: September 14, 1922
- Type: Research institute
- Purpose: Marine science research
- Location: 1 Cầu Đá, Nha Trang, Khánh Hòa Province, Vietnam
- Parent organization: Vietnam Academy of Science and Technology
- Staff: 154
- Website: vnio.org.vn

The Institute of Oceanography, Nha Trang (Vietnamese: Viện Hải dương học Nha Trang) is a marine science research institute located in Nha Trang, Khánh Hòa Province, Vietnam. Established on September 14, 1922, it is one of the oldest scientific research institutions in Vietnam and serves as a leading center for tropical oceanographic research in Southeast Asia. The institute operates under the Vietnam Academy of Science and Technology (VAST) and focuses on basic and applied research in marine sciences, resource management, environmental protection, and education.

== History ==
The institute was founded in 1922 as the Sở Hải dương học nghề cá Đông Dương (Indochina Fisheries Oceanography Department) during the French colonial period, following a proposal by Dr. Alexandre Yersin. In 1929, it was upgraded to the Viện Hải dương học Đông Dương (Indochina Oceanography Institute), with Dr. A. Krempf as its first director. After several name changes and reorganizations, including Hải học viện Nha Trang in 1952, it was officially renamed the Institute of Oceanography in 1993. In 2001, its branches in Hanoi and Hai Phong were separated into independent institutes: the Institute of Marine Geology and Geophysics (Hanoi) and the Institute of Marine Environment and Resources (Hai Phong).

Over its century-long history, the institute has participated in major international programs, such as the NAGA (1959–1960) and CSK (1965–1977) initiatives, focusing on marine ecosystems and currents like the Kuroshio. In 2022, on its 100th anniversary, the institute was awarded the First-Class Labor Medal for its contributions to marine science, environmental protection, and national sovereignty over seas and islands.

== Oceanography Museum ==
The Oceanography Museum, part of the institute, is renowned for its collection of over 24,000 specimens representing more than 5,000 marine and freshwater species, including an 18-meter whale skeleton.

== See also ==
- Vietnam Academy of Science and Technology
- Marine biology
- Oceanography
