= Trầm Hương Tower =

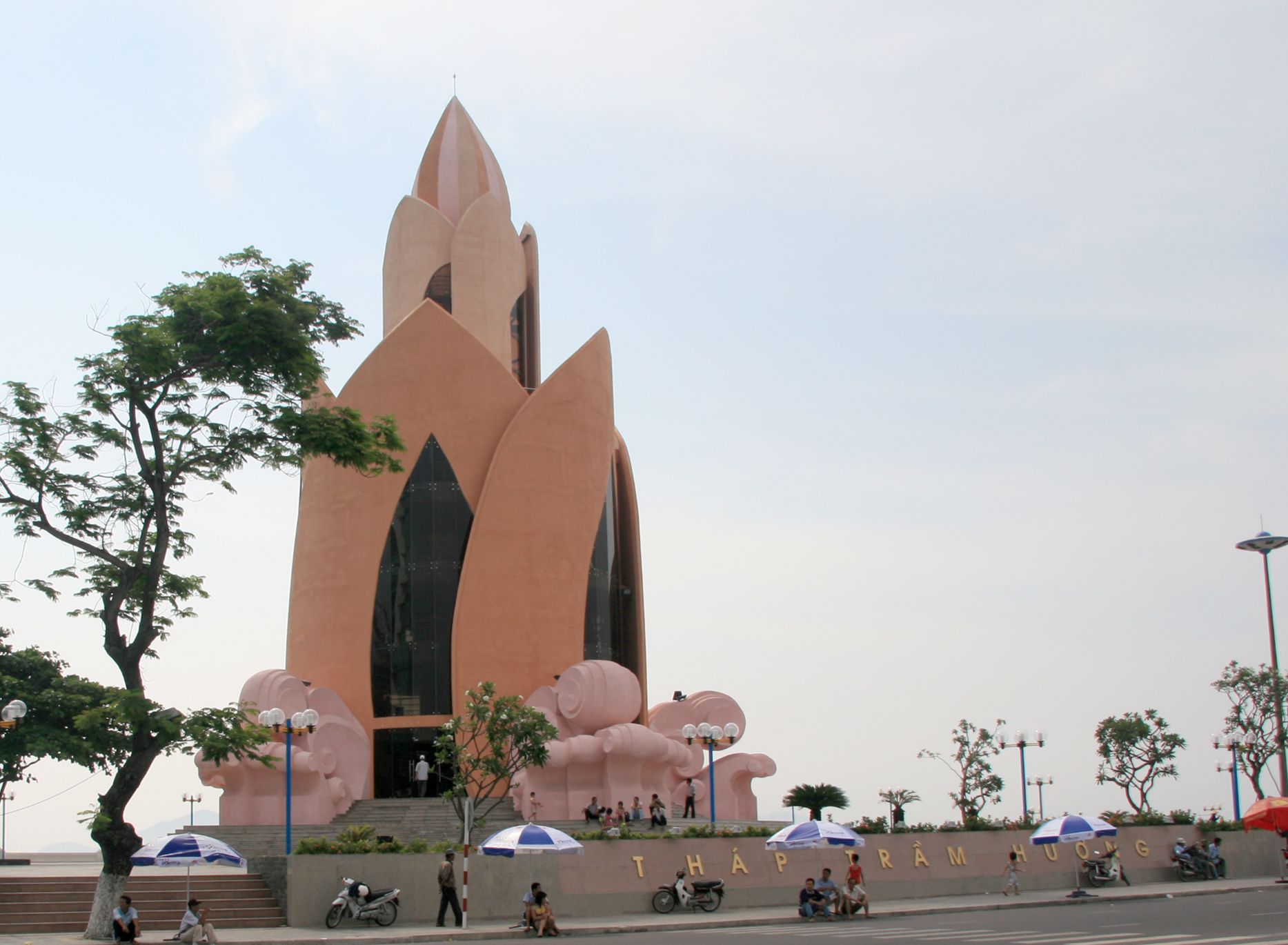
- Trầm Hương Tower, viewed from Trần Phú Street
- Interactive map of the Trầm Hương Tower area

General information
- Status: Completed
- Type: Museum display
- Location: Lộc Thọ, Nha Trang, Khánh Hòa province, Vietnam
- Coordinates: 12°14′25.73″N 109°11′48.47″E
- Construction started: Year 2004
- Completed: 2008
- Opening: November 22, 2008
- Cost: VNĐ18.7 billion

Technical details
- Floor count: 6 floors

Design and construction
- Architects: Architect Lê Thanh Tùng and Beautiful Architecture Consulting Company Limited - Nha Trang
- Main contractor: Vinpearl Tourism & Trade Joint Stock Company and An Viên Joint Stock Company

The Trầm Hương Tower (Vietnamese: Tháp Trầm Hương, lit. 'Agarwood Tower') is a multi-venue Performing arts in Nha Trang, Vietnam. Located on the foreshore of Lộc Thọ, it is widely regarded as one of the distinctive buildings and a masterpiece of 21st-century architecture.
