= Vân Phong Bay =

Coordinates: 12.66°N 109.28°E

Vân Phong Bay is a scenic area in Khánh Hòa Province, Vietnam. It is one of 21 Vietnam National Tourist Areas.

On April 26 1905 the Russian fleet on the way to Battle of Tsushima anchored in the bay. Thirteen days later they were ordered to leave the bay by the French authorities after which they continued to leave and enter the bay until they were met by a fleet under Nikolai Nebogatov on May 9th. The combined fleets left for good on May 14.

The area is the site of the planned Vân Phong Port.
