= Nha Trang =

Nha Trang Phường Nha Trang
- Ward
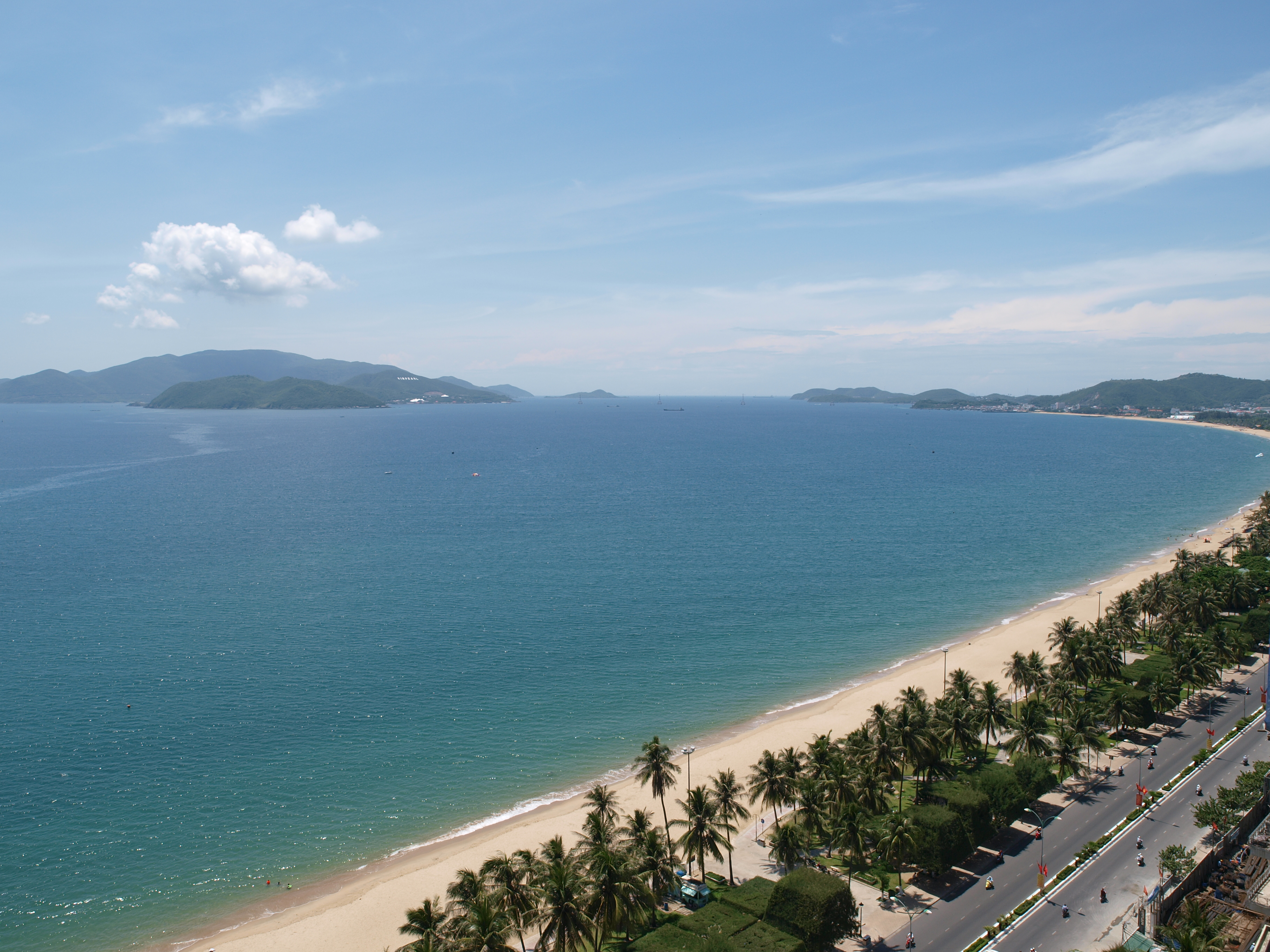
- Nha Trang Beach
- Interactive map of Nha Trang
- Coordinates: 12°14′28″N 109°11′28″E
- Country: Vietnam
- Province: Khánh Hòa province
- Established: June 16, 2025

Area
  - Total: 18.20 sq mi (47.13 km^{2})

Population (2024)
  - Total: 136,118
  - Density: 7,480/sq mi (2,888/km^{2})
- Time zone: UTC+07:00 (Indochina Time)
- Administrative code: 22366

Nha Trang (Vietnamese: Phường Nha Trang) is a ward of Khánh Hòa province, Vietnam. It is one of the 65 new wards, communes and special zones of the province following the reorganization in 2025.

== History ==
On June 16, 2025, the National Assembly Standing Committee issued Resolution No. 1667/NQ-UBTVQH15 on the arrangement of commune-level administrative units of Khánh Hòa province in 2025 (effective from June 16, 2025). Accordingly, the entire land area and population of Vạn Thạnh, Lộc Thọ, Vĩnh Nguyên, Tân Tiến and Phước Hòa wards of the former Nha Trang city will be integrated into a new ward named Nha Trang (Clause 49, Article 1).
