= Pasteur Network =

Global alliance of health and research organizations

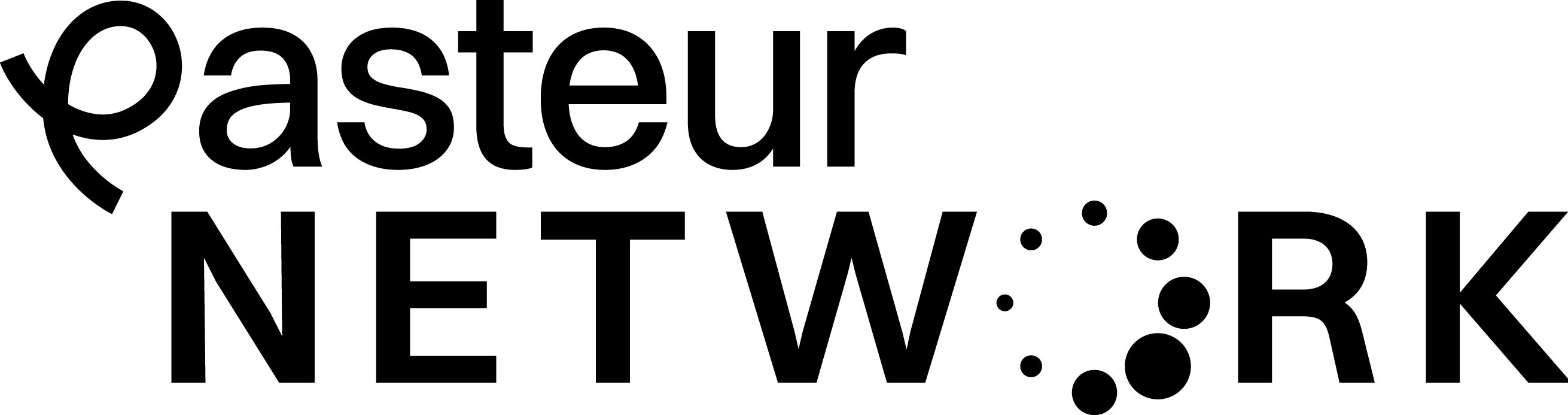
- Named after: Louis Pasteur
- Formation: 2011
- Headquarters: 25 Rue du Docteur Roux, 75015 Paris
- Location: Paris, France Dakar, Senegal
- Members: 32
- Executive Director: Rebecca Grais
- R.O.R. Id: https://ror.org/04cb2ne58
- Website: https://pasteur-network.org/
- Formerly called: Pasteur Institute International Network

The Pasteur Network, (formerly known as the Pasteur Institute International Network), is a global alliance of 32 institutes, most named after Louis Pasteur, dedicated to addressing public health challenges through scientific research, innovation, and collaboration. Initially founded in 2011 as the Pasteur International Network, the association adopted a new governance model in 2021 and became the Pasteur Network.

Recognized as a non-state actor by the World Health Organization (WHO), the Pasteur Network maintains close ties with national health authorities, with many of its members working alongside local Ministries of Health. The network supports a global infrastructure, comprising more than 50 national and regional reference laboratories, including multiple Biosafety Level 3 facilities, and WHO Collaborating Centers.

During major public health crisis, like Ebola, MPox, or COVID-19 pandemic, members from the Pasteur Network worked on different aspect of public health research to tackle the disease, including surveillance, testing and virology analysis.

== History and governance ==
The global network began to form shortly after, with early satellite institutes established in Saigon (now Ho Chi Minh City) in 1891, Tunis in 1893, Algiers in 1894, Senegal in 1896, and Brazzaville in 1908. Louis Pasteur's inspiring message, "Science knows no countries", led to the creation of the extensive network of centers. Each center maintains its own network, strategy, and collaborations locally, within the Pasteur Network, and with other organizations. The Network's governance underwent a significant transformation starting in June 2021, with the appointment of an Executive Director, Rebecca F. Grais, and the implementation of a more participatory and balanced governance structure designed to enhance collective action and amplify member voices. This structural adjustment in 2023 focused on strengthening collaborative governance and enhancing regional representation, leading to improved regional and thematic coordination, financial planning, and the establishment of clear terms of reference for its Board. This renewal marked a crucial step towards realizing the Network's full potential as a non-state, not-for-profit, global actor and leader. Leadership was transferred from the Institut Pasteur to a board of directors and an executive committee made up of the Network's constituent members, led by an elected president.

== Members ==
The Pasteur Network is an alliance of 32 institutes worldwide. Its members meet regularly to discuss about their collaboration and coordination facing global public health challenges.

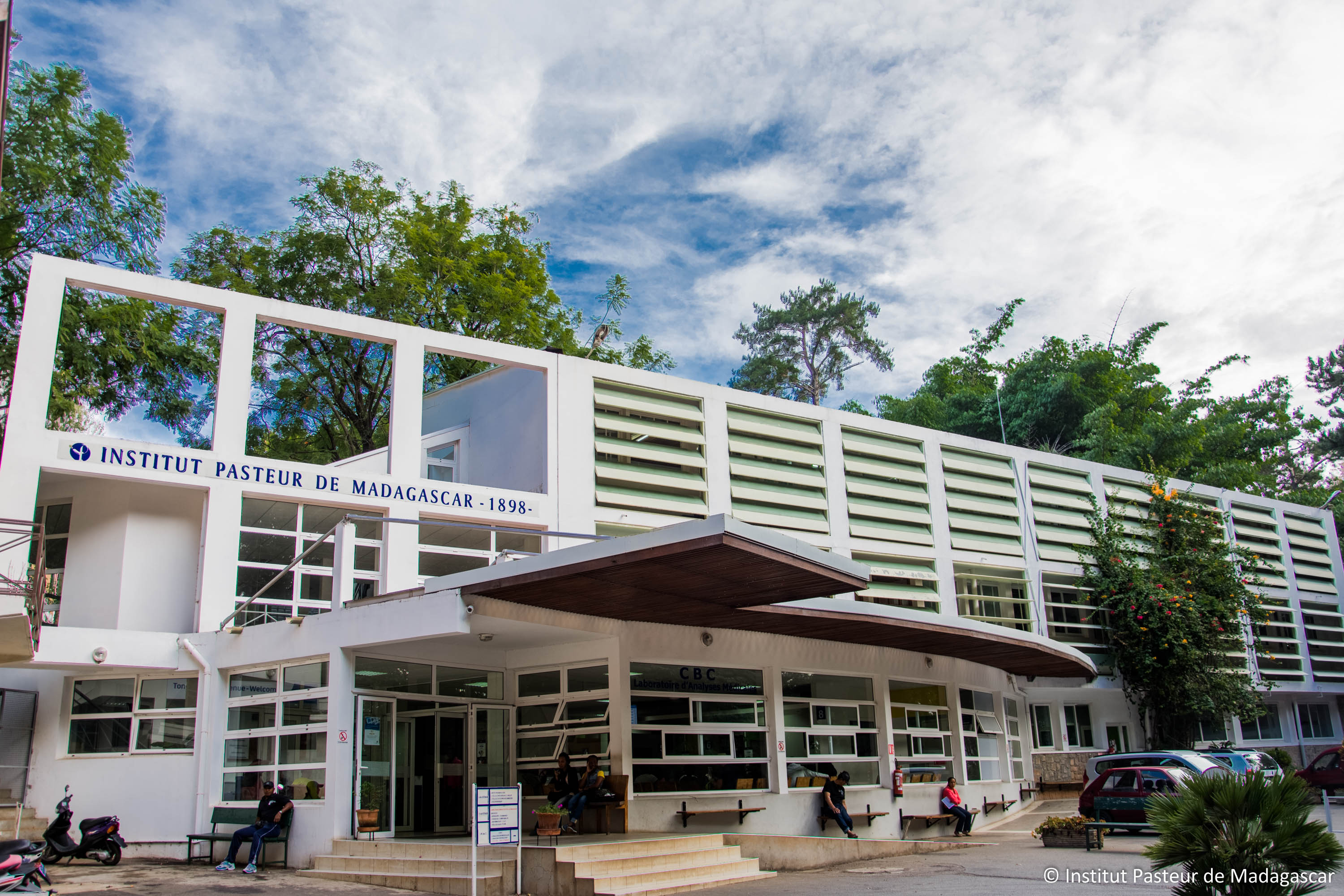
Bâtiment MONOD, Institut Pasteur de Madagascar

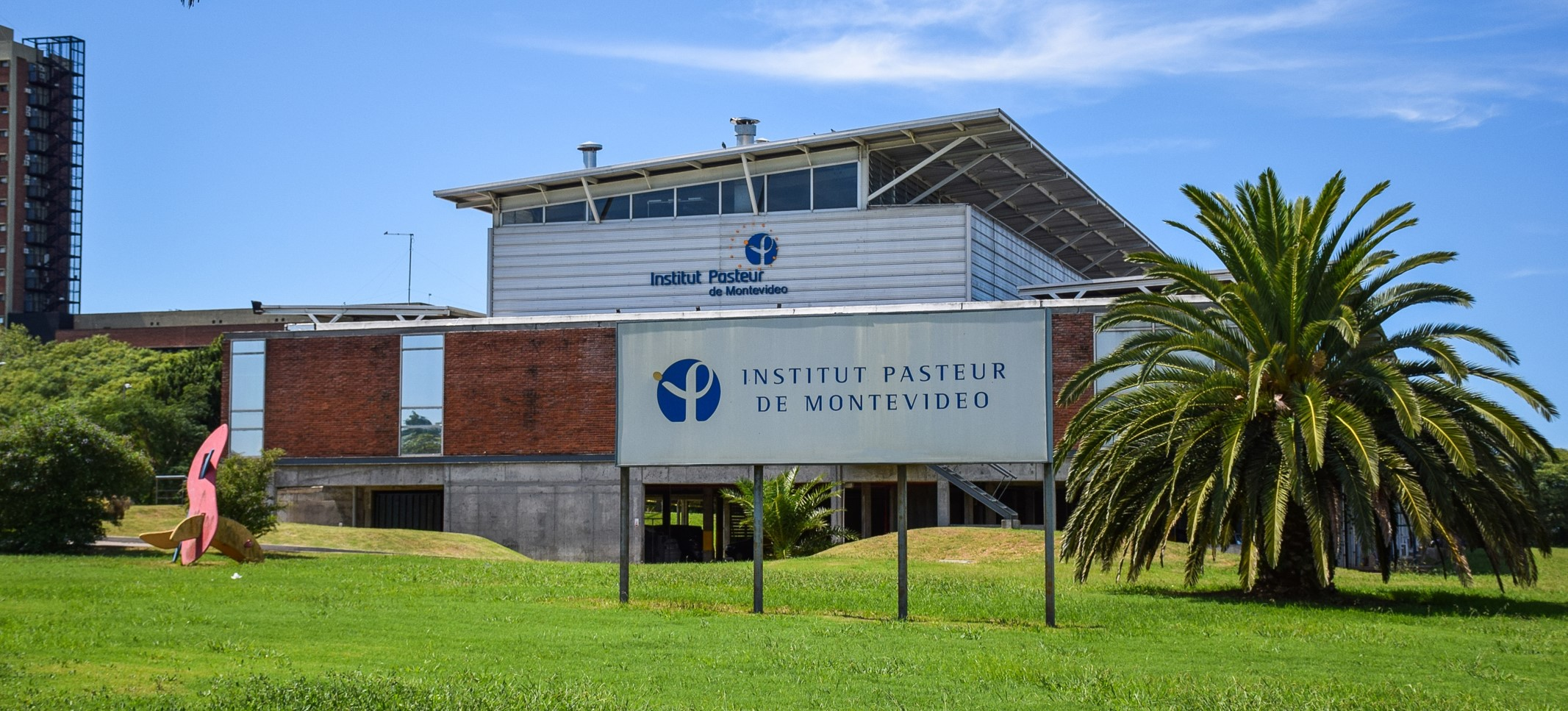
Institut Pasteur in Montevideo, Uruguay

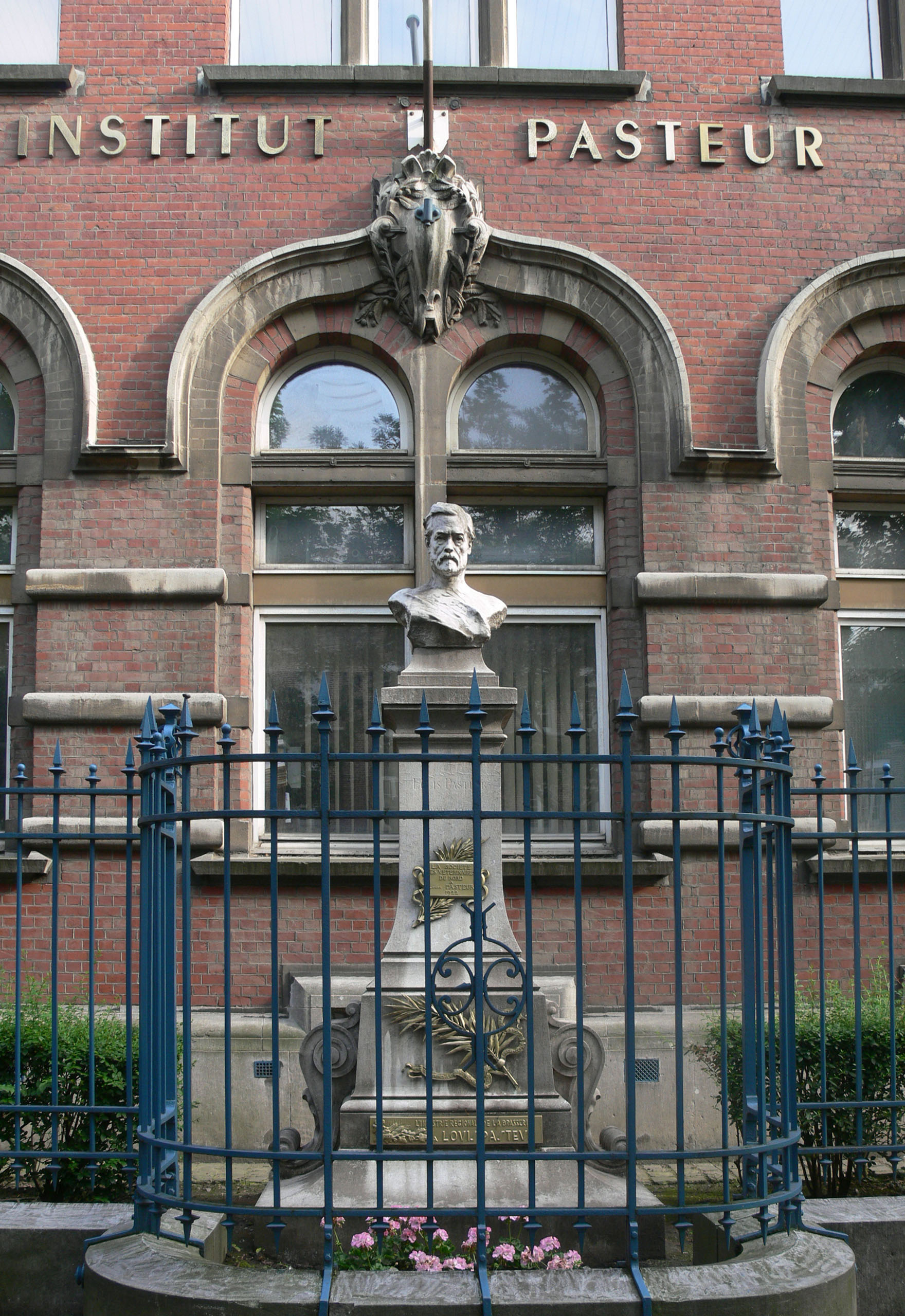
Institut Pasteur de Lille

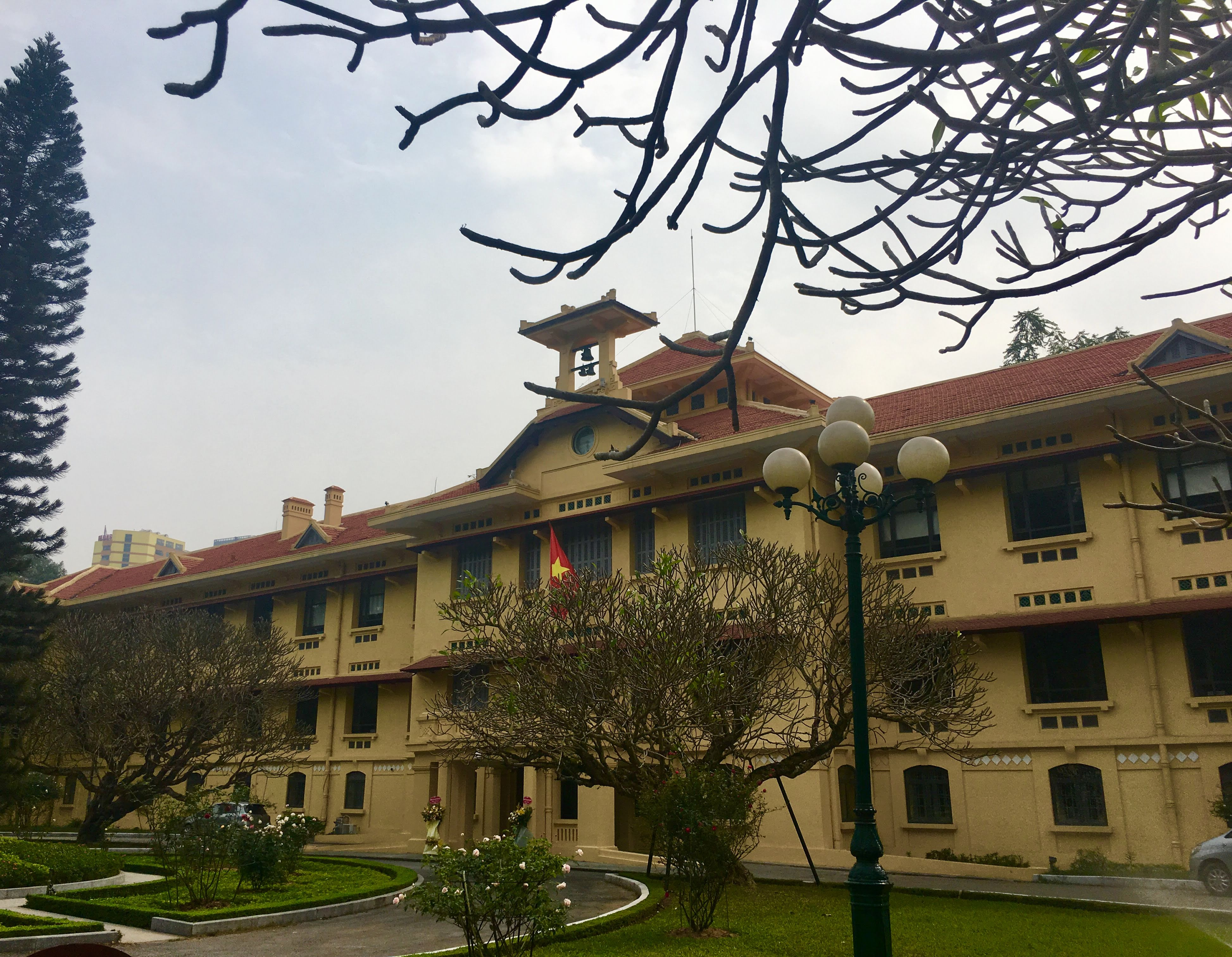
Pasteur Institute in Hanoi, Vietnam

| Region | City | Country | Institute name | Date Created |
|---|---|---|---|---|
| Euro-Mediterranean | Algiers | Algeria | Pasteur Institute of Algeria | 1894 |
| Euro-Mediterranean | Athens | Greece | Hellenic Pasteur Institute | 1920 |
| Africa | Bangui | Central African Republic | Institut Pasteur de Bangui | 1961 |
| Euro-Mediterranean | Brussels | Belgium | Sciensano | 1904 |
| Euro-Mediterranean | Rome | Italy | Istituto Pasteur Italia - Cenci Bolognetti Foundation | 1964 |
| Africa | Conakry | Guinea | Institut Pasteur de Guinée | 2015 |
| Americas | Rio de Janeiro, Fiocruz | Brazil | Oswaldo Cruz Foundation | 1900 |
| Americas | Sao Paulo | Brazil | Institut Pasteur de Sao Paulo | |
| Asia-Pacific | Phnom Penh | Cambodia | Institute Pasteur du Cambodge | 1953 |
| Africa | Dakar | Senegal | Institute Pasteur de Dakar | 1924 |
| Euro-Mediterranean | Lille | France | Institut Pasteur de Lille | 1984 |
| Americas | Pointe-à-Pitre | Guadeloupe, France | Institut Pasteur de Guadeloupe | 1924 |
| Americas | Cayenne | French Guiana, France | Institut Pasteur de la Guyane | 1940 |
| Euro-Mediterranean | Paris | France | Pasteur Institute | |
| Asia-Pacific | Ho Chi Minh City | Vietnam | Institut Pasteur in Ho Chi Minh City | 1891 |
| Asia-Pacific | Nha Trang | Vietnam | Pasteur Institute of Nha Trang | 1895 |
| Asia-Pacific | Hanoi | Vietnam | National Institute of Hygiene and Epidemiology | 1924 |
| Asia-Pacific | Vientiane | Laos | Institut Pasteur in Laos | 2007 |
| Asia-Pacific | Tehran | Iran | Pasteur Institute of Iran | 1919 |
| Africa | Abidjan | Côte d'Ivoire | Institut Pasteur de Côte d'Ivoire | 1972 |
| Africa | Tananarive | Madagascar | Institut Pasteur de Madagascar | 1898 |
| Euro-Mediterranean | Casablanca | Morocco | Institut Pasteur du Maroc | 1911 |
| Asia-Pacific | Nouméa | New Caledonia, France | Institut Pasteur in New Caledonia | 1955 |
| Euro-Mediterranean | St Petersburg | Russia | Institut Pasteur in Saint Petersburg | 1923 |
| Euro-Mediterranean | Tunis | Tunisia | Pasteur Institute of Tunis | 1893 |
| Americas | Montevideo | Uruguay | Institut Pasteur Montevideo | 2006 |
| Euro-Mediterranean | Sofia | Bulgaria | Stephan Angeloff Institute of Microbiology | 1947 |
| Africa | Niamey | Niger | CERMES | 1980 |
| Africa | Yaoundé, | Cameroon | Institut Pasteur du Cameroun | 1959 |
| Asia-Pacific | Seoul | South Korea | Institut Pasteur Korea | 2003 |
| Americas | Montreal, Laval | Canada | INRS - Armand-Frappier Santé Biotechnologie Research Centre | 1938 |
| Asia-Pacific | Hong Kong | China | Hong Kong University - Pasteur Research Centre | 1999 |
