= Jean-Paul Gonzalez =

French virologist

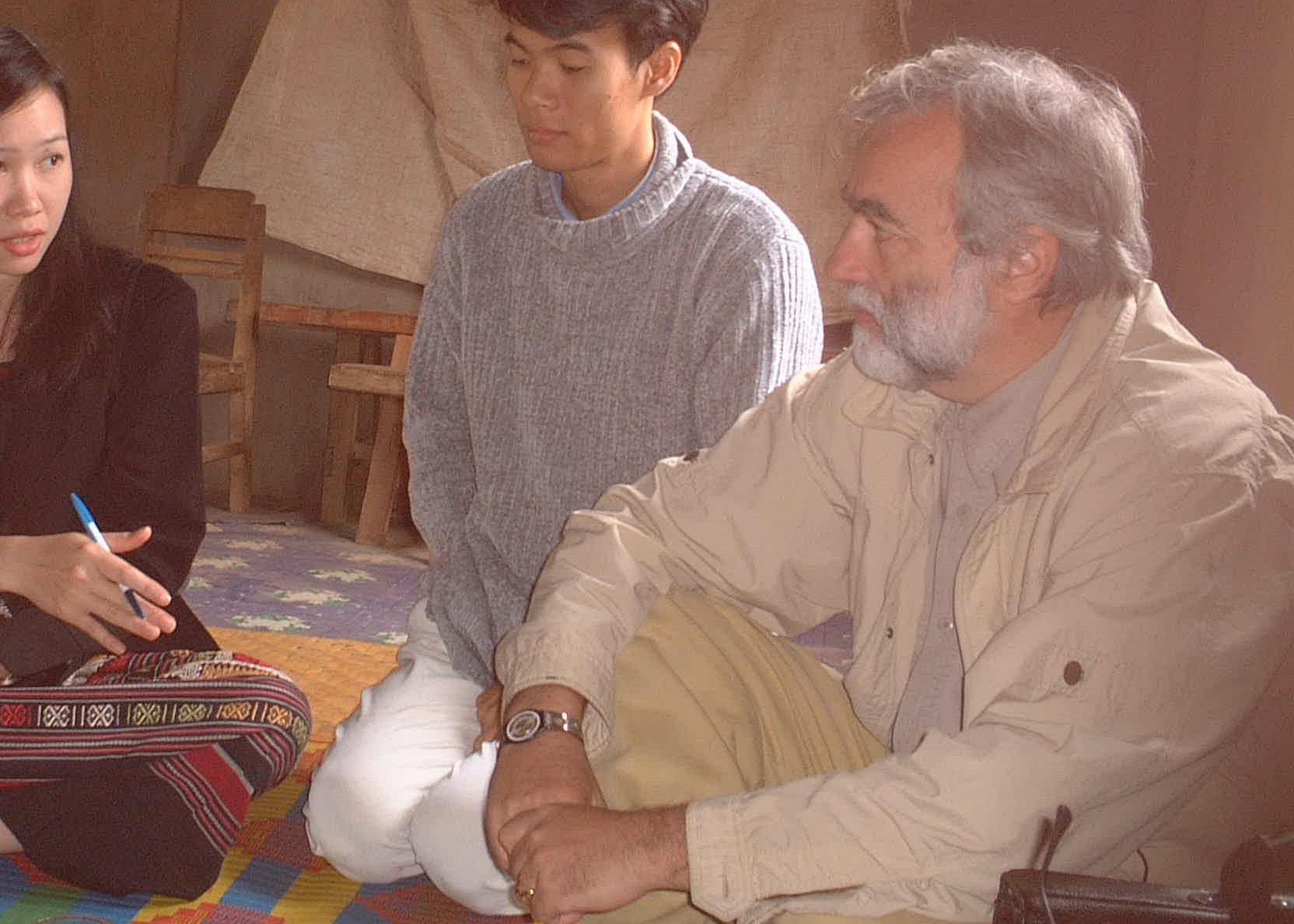
- Jean Paul Gonzalez conducting public health interview in Laos
- Born: France
- Citizenship: French
- Education: University of Clermont-Ferrand (PhD in viral ecology, 1984); Bordeaux University Medical School (MD)
- Known for: Research on disease emergence, viral hemorrhagic fevers, arbovirology, zoonotic pathogens; application of One Health approaches
- Children: 4
- Scientific career
- Fields: Virology, Eco-epidemiology, Emerging Infectious Diseases
- Workplaces: Institut Pasteur International Network; French Research Institute for Development (IRD); Centers for Disease Control and Prevention; Yale Arbovirus Research Unit; Mahidol University; Metabiota Inc.; CIRMF; Kansas State University;Georgetown University Medical Center

Jean-Paul Joseph Gonzalez (born August 28, 1947) is a French virologist whose research focuses on pathogen emergence, disease eco-epidemiology, arbovirology and vector-transmitted diseases, and viral hemorrhagic fevers. He graduated from the Medical School of Bordeaux University (M.D., Internal Medicine), France and completed Ph.D. in Viral Molecular Biology and Genetics from the Faculty of science, University of Clermont-Ferrand.

== Early life ==
Gonzalez was born and raised near the town of Saint Georges de Didonne in South-West of France in 1947. His father, Jesus Gonzalez, was a Spanish immigrant, born in Madrid who fled from General Franco’s regime to France during the Spanish Civil War. Jean-Paul's mother, Jeanne Charlotte Rives, was third daughter of a barrel maker from the Blaye vineyard of Bordeaux. She raised their three children (Denis, Denise and Jean-Paul).

== Education and early career ==
Gonzalez graduated from the Medical School of Bordeaux University in 1974. At the same institution, he also earned a Master’s degree in Tropical Medicine and Hygiene and a medical diploma for the French Commercial Navy.

He subsequently completed a medical residency in French Guiana at Hôpital André-Bouron, located along the Maroni River.

Upon returning to Bordeaux, he was appointed associate professor of parasitology and fundamental sciences at the Bordeaux School of Medicine and served as a medical attendant at the Hôpital des Enfants Malades. He also worked as a dual appointment as biologist at Saint-André Teaching Hospital.

== Academic appointments ==
In the 1990s, Gonzalez served as visiting professor of epidemiology and public health at the Yale School of Medicine, focusing on arboviruses and hemorrhagic fevers, including dengue and South American viral hemorrhagic fevers.

From 1997 to 2005, he held multiple academic and research leadership roles at Mahidol University in Thailand, including visiting professor of virology and vaccinology, co-director of research programs on emerging viral diseases in Southeast Asia (Center for Vaccine Development) and co-director of research programs on vectors and vector-borne disease (Faculty of Science).

From 2008 to 2012, he served as Director-General and Scientific Director of the International Center for Medical Research of Franceville (CIRMF) in Gabon, following appointment by the French Ministry of Foreign and European Affairs and nomination by the President of Gabon. During his tenure, CIRMF expanded research in eco-epidemiology, including, among others, emerging infectious diseases, zoonoses, human genetics, and One Health–oriented public health strategies.

== ORSTOM, IRD, Institut Pasteur and international research ==
Gonzalez completed his French national service as a Volunteer at the National Active Service (VSNA) at the Pasteur Institute of Tunis, where he conducted preliminary research on parasite natural cycles and entomological surveillance for malaria under World Health Organization programs. During this period, he published foundational studies on parasites of Tunisian fauna.

After returning from Tunisia, he was recruited by the Office of Overseas Scientific Research (ORSTOM; now the Research Institute for Development, IRD), where he spent approximately thirty years as a physician-researcher working in countries across the Americas, Africa, and Asia. He was ORSTOM’s first medical virologist. As a research director at IRD, he established two research units in the early 21st century that adopted transdisciplinary approaches to emerging diseases with study sites on four continents. He later collaborated with teams within the Pasteur Institute’s international network.

He later spent more than a decade as a laboratory chief and department head within the Institut Pasteur International Network, including posts in Bangui (Central African Republic) and Dakar (Senegal), where he led research programs in arbovirology, hemorrhagic fevers, and field epidemiology.

During two periods at the Pasteur Institute in Bangui, and in collaboration with researchers from the U.S. Centers for Disease Control and Prevention and USAMRIID, he contributed to the identification and characterization of a wide range of viruses associated with hemorrhagic diseases in Central and West Africa. This work expanded understanding of viral diversity in the region and informed subsequent research on hemorrhagic fever viruses, including Crimean–Congo hemorrhagic fever, Rift Valley fever, Ebola, Marburg, Lassa, and related viruses.

Therefore, in 1990, Gonzalez became one of the first foreign scientist to work in a CDCs’ BSL-4 laboratory in the United States, analyzing samples collected in Central Africa for Ebola, Marburg, arenaviruses, hantaviruses, and Crimean-Congo hemorrhagic fever virus.

== Later career ==
In 2012, Gonzalez joined Metabiota, Inc. as senior scientist and program advisor, contributing to emerging disease surveillance, biosafety, and biosecurity programs in Africa and Eastern Europe.

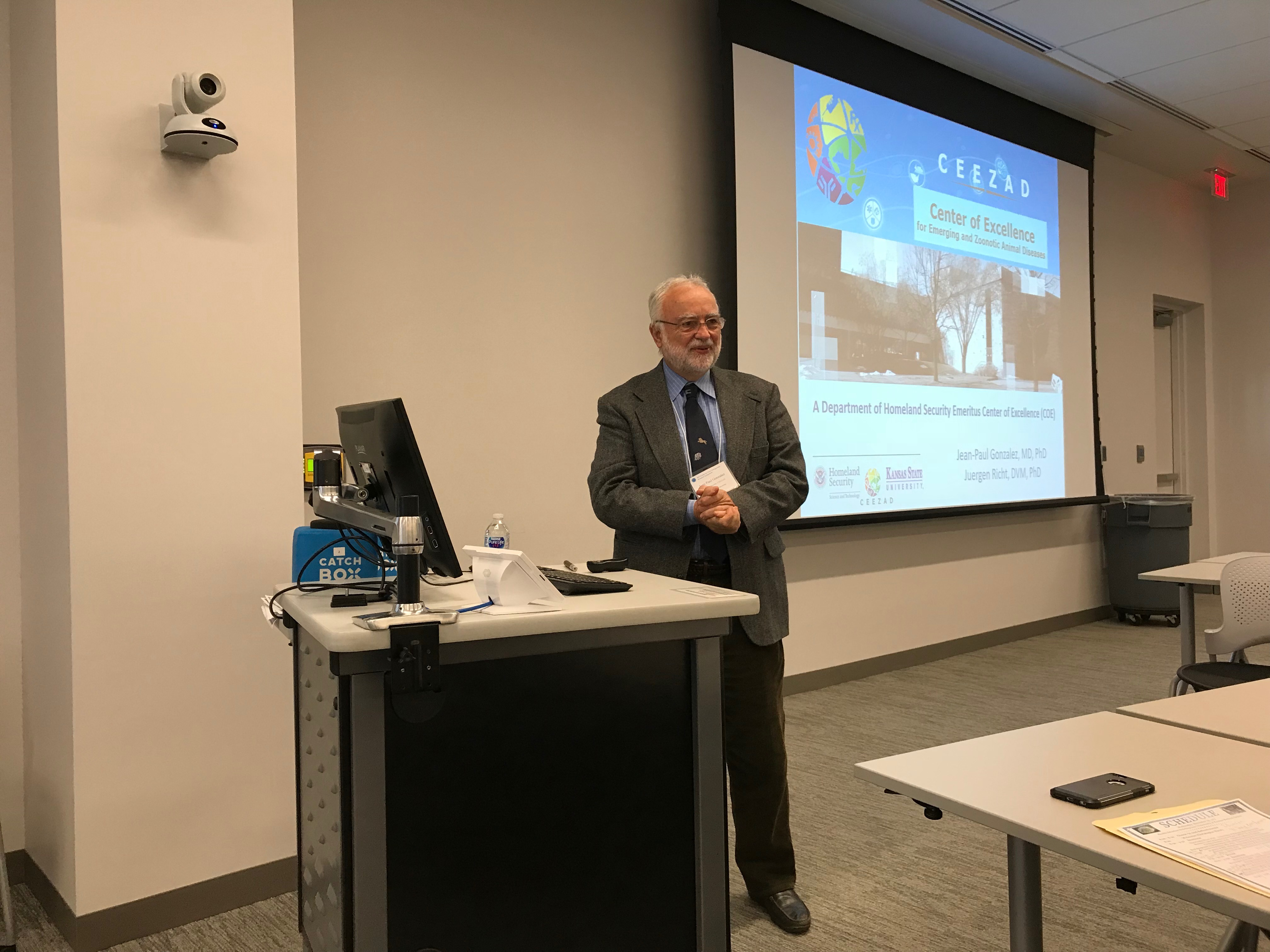
Jean Paul Gonzalez presenting the Center of Excellence of Emerging Zoonotic and Animal Disease (Kansas State University, Manhattan, KS) at University of Kansas School of Medicine, Lawrence, KS.

From 2016 to 2019, he held leadership roles at Kansas State University, including Deputy Director of the Center of Excellence for Emerging Zoonotic and Animal Diseases (CEEZAD), where he focused on zoonoses, vaccine development, and global health security.

In 2019, Gonzalez joined as faculty and currently is adjunct professor of medicine in the Department of Immunology and Microbiology at Georgetown University School of Medicine.

== Research ==
=== Disease emergence and viral ecology ===
Gonzalez’s research has focused on the emergence of infectious diseases and the ecological factors associated with viral spillover from animals to humans. Drawing on training in viral ecology, he has studied interactions among viruses, animal reservoirs, vectors, and human populations, with attention to the effects of environmental change, biodiversity loss, land use, climate variability, and human mobility on pathogen emergence and re-emergence.

=== Arbovirology and vector-borne diseases ===
Gonzalez has conducted extensive research on arboviruses transmitted by mosquitoes and other arthropods. His work includes epidemiological, entomological, and laboratory studies on dengue virus, Rift Valley fever virus, yellow fever virus, Zika virus, chikungunya virus, and other emerging arboviruses in space and time, depending on the geographical areas and populations studied.

His research has addressed virus circulation and epidemiological patterns, vector competence, outbreak prediction, and biosurveillance strategies. He has also contributed to the use of geographic information systems (GIS) and spatial modeling for mapping arbovirus transmission and identifying high-risk zones, particularly in Africa, Southeast Asia, and Latin America.

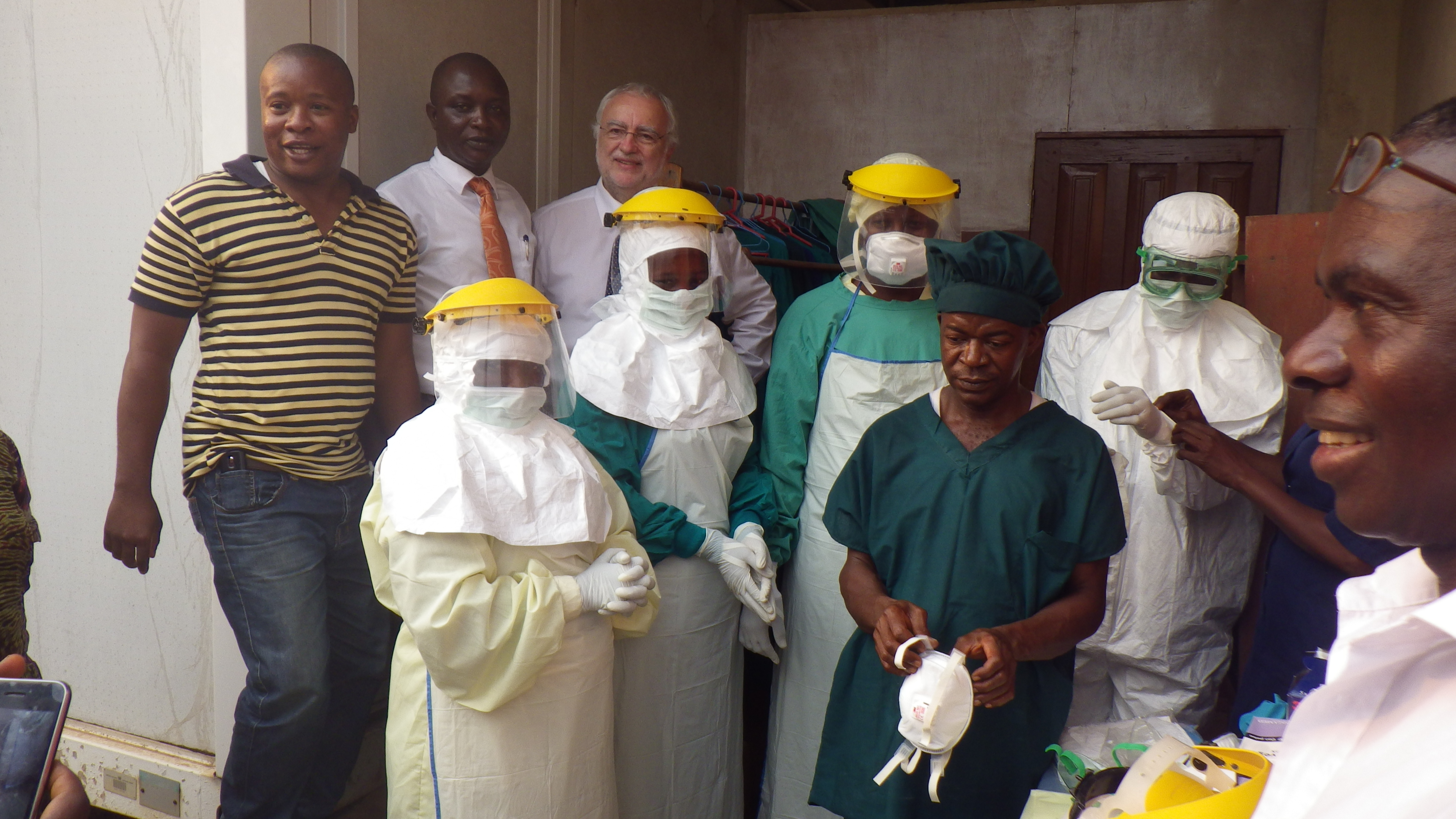
Jean Paul Gonzalez and team training public health workers for viral hemorrhagic fever preparedness and response

=== Viral hemorrhagic fevers ===
A major component of Gonzalez’s scientific output concerns viral hemorrhagic fevers (VHFs). He has worked extensively on Ebola virus disease, Marburg virus disease, Lassa fever, Crimean-Congo hemorrhagic fever, hantavirus infections, and South American arenaviral hemorrhagic fevers.

His research includes field investigations, outbreak response support, sero-epidemiological studies, and laboratory analysis conducted in high-containment (BSL-3 and BSL-4) facilities. Gonzalez was among the early international researchers analyzing African hemorrhagic fever samples in U.S. high-security laboratories and contributed to improving diagnostic, surveillance, and biosafety practices for these pathogens.

=== Zoonoses and wildlife reservoirs ===
Gonzalez has examined zoonotic transmission at the human–animal interface, including the role of wildlife, livestock, and domestic animals as viral reservoirs or amplifying hosts. His field-based research has focused on pathogen circulation in forested and rural environments and has informed zoonotic spillover risk assessment and interdisciplinary infectious disease research.

=== One Health and global health research ===
Throughout his career, Gonzalez has supported integrated health approaches that link human, animal, and environmental health. He was involved in the early development and application of the One Health framework, particularly in relation to translational research in intertropical regions. His contributions included field-based research programs, institutional roles, and capacity-building initiatives in Africa and Asia.

His work in this area has addressed health system preparedness, the development of surveillance networks, and interdisciplinary training programs focused on strengthening local and regional responses to emerging infectious diseases.

=== Vaccinology and translational research ===
In later phases of his career, Gonzalez has been involved in translational research related to vaccines for emerging viral diseases. His contributions include pre-clinical and early clinical research efforts related to dengue, Ebola virus disease, Rift Valley fever, and Zika virus. In the same strategy, he also actively participated in the development of early diagnostics for detecting epidemic risk. This work bridges laboratory science, field epidemiology, and public health implementation.

== Selected publications ==
- Pourrut, X.; Nkoghé, D.; Gonzalez, J. P. (2011). "No Evidence of Dengue Virus Circulation in Rural Gabon". Emerging Infectious Diseases. 17 (8): 1568–1569. doi:10.3201/eid1708.110400 (inactive 4 February 2026). PMID 21801657.
- Leroy, E.; Gonzalez, J. P. (2012). "Filovirus Research in Gabon and Equatorial Africa: The Experience of a Research Center in the Heart of Africa". Viruses. 4 (9): 1592–1604. doi:10.3390/v4091592. PMC 3499821. PMID 23170174.
- Nkoghe, D.; Toung-Mve, M.; Leroy, E. M.; Gonzalez, J. P. (2012). "Cutaneous manifestations of filovirus infections". International Journal of Dermatology. 51 (9): 1037–1043. doi:10.1111/j.1365-4632.2011.05350.x. PMID 22909355.
- Pourrut, X.; Souris, M.; Valdivia-Granda, W.; Gonzalez, J. P. (2018). "Global Spread of Hemorrhagic Fever Viruses: Predicting Pandemics". Hemorrhagic Fever Viruses. Methods in Molecular Biology. Vol. 1604. Humana Press. pp. 3–31. doi:10.1007/978-1-4939-6981-4_1. ISBN 978-1-4939-6980-7. PMC 7120037. PMID 28986822.
