= Albert Calmette =

French physician and immunologist (1863–1933)

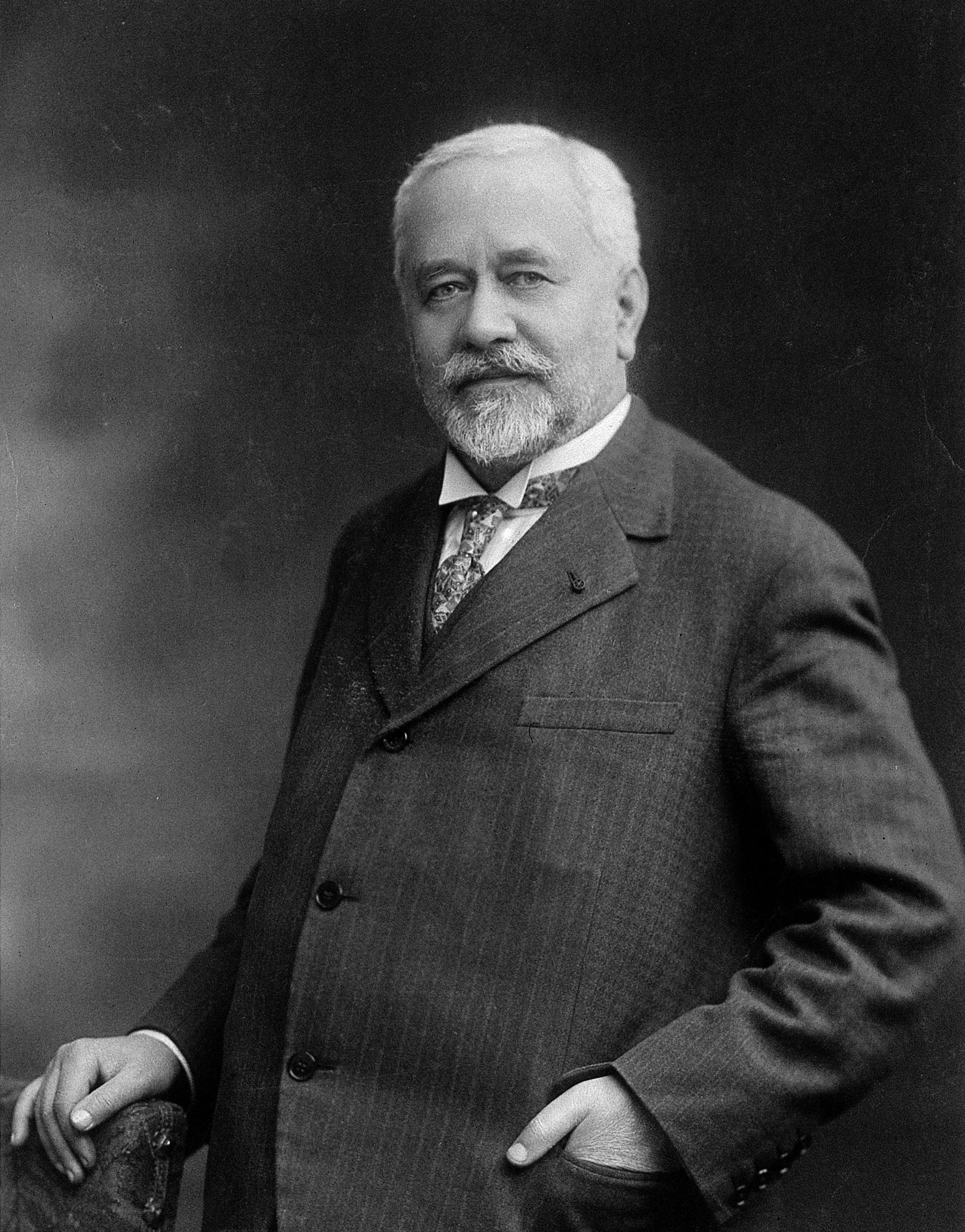
- Calmette in 1930
- Born: 12 July 1863; Nice, France
- Died: 29 October 1933 (aged 70); Paris, France
- Known for: Bacillus Calmette-Guérin antivenin
- Scientific career
- Fields: Bacteriology
- Workplaces: Pasteur Institute

Léon Charles Albert Calmette ForMemRS (French pronunciation: [leɔ̃ ʃaʁl albɛʁ kalmɛt]; 12 July 1863 – 29 October 1933) was a French physician, bacteriologist and immunologist, and an important officer of the Pasteur Institute. He co-discovered the Bacillus Calmette-Guérin, an attenuated form of Mycobacterium bovis used in the BCG vaccine against tuberculosis. He also developed the first antivenom for snake venom, the Calmette's serum.

== Early career ==
Calmette was born in Nice, France to Guillame Calmette and Adèle Charpentier on July 12, 1863. He studied at various schools in Clermont-Ferrand, including the Lycée Saint-Charles in Saint-Brieucand, in Brest, as well as at Lycée Saint-Louis in Paris. Calmette wanted to become a sailor and serve in the Navy, but a bout of typhoid at age 13 made him medically unfit. So in 1881 he joined the Navy as a physician getting his training at the School of Naval Physicians at Brest. In 1883 he began medical practice in the Naval Medical Corps in Hong Kong, where he worked with Patrick Manson. Together they studied the mosquito transmission of the parasitic worm, filaria, the cause of elephantiasis. Calmette completed his medical degree on the subject of filariasis. He was then assigned to Saint-Pierre and Miquelon, where he arrived in 1887. Afterwards, he served in West Africa, in Gabon and French Congo, where he continued research on malaria, sleeping sickness and pellagra.

== Association with Pasteur ==
Upon his return to France in 1890, Calmette met Louis Pasteur (1822–1895) and Emile Roux (1853–1933), who was his professor in a course on bacteriology. He became an associate and was charged by Pasteur to found and direct a branch of the Pasteur Institute at Saigon (French Indochina), in 1891 There, he dedicated himself to the nascent field of toxicology, which had important connections to immunology, and he studied snake and bee venom, plant poisons and curare. He also organized the production of the existing vaccines against smallpox and rabies and carried out research on cholera, and the fermentation of opium and rice.

In 1894, he returned to France and developed the first antivenoms for snake bites using immune sera from vaccinated horses (Calmette's serum). Work in this field was later taken up by Brazilian physician Vital Brazil, in São Paulo at the Instituto Butantan, who developed several other antivenoms against snakes, scorpions and spiders.

He also took part in the development in the first immune serum against the bubonic plague (black pest), in collaboration with the discoverer of its pathogenic agent, Yersinia pestis, by Alexandre Yersin (1863–1943), and went to Portugal to study and to help fight a plague epidemic at Porto in 1899.

== Institute leadership ==
In 1895, Roux entrusted him with the directorship of the Institute's branch at Lille (Institut Pasteur de Lille), where he remained for the next 25 years. In 1901, he founded the first antituberculosis dispensary at Lille, and named it after Emile Roux. In 1904, he founded the Ligue du Nord contre la Tuberculose (Northern Antituberculosis League), which still exists today.

In 1909, he helped to establish the Institute branch in Algiers, Algeria. In 1918, he accepted the post of assistant director of the Institute in Paris; the following year he was made a member of the Académie Nationale de Médecine.

== Research on tuberculosis ==
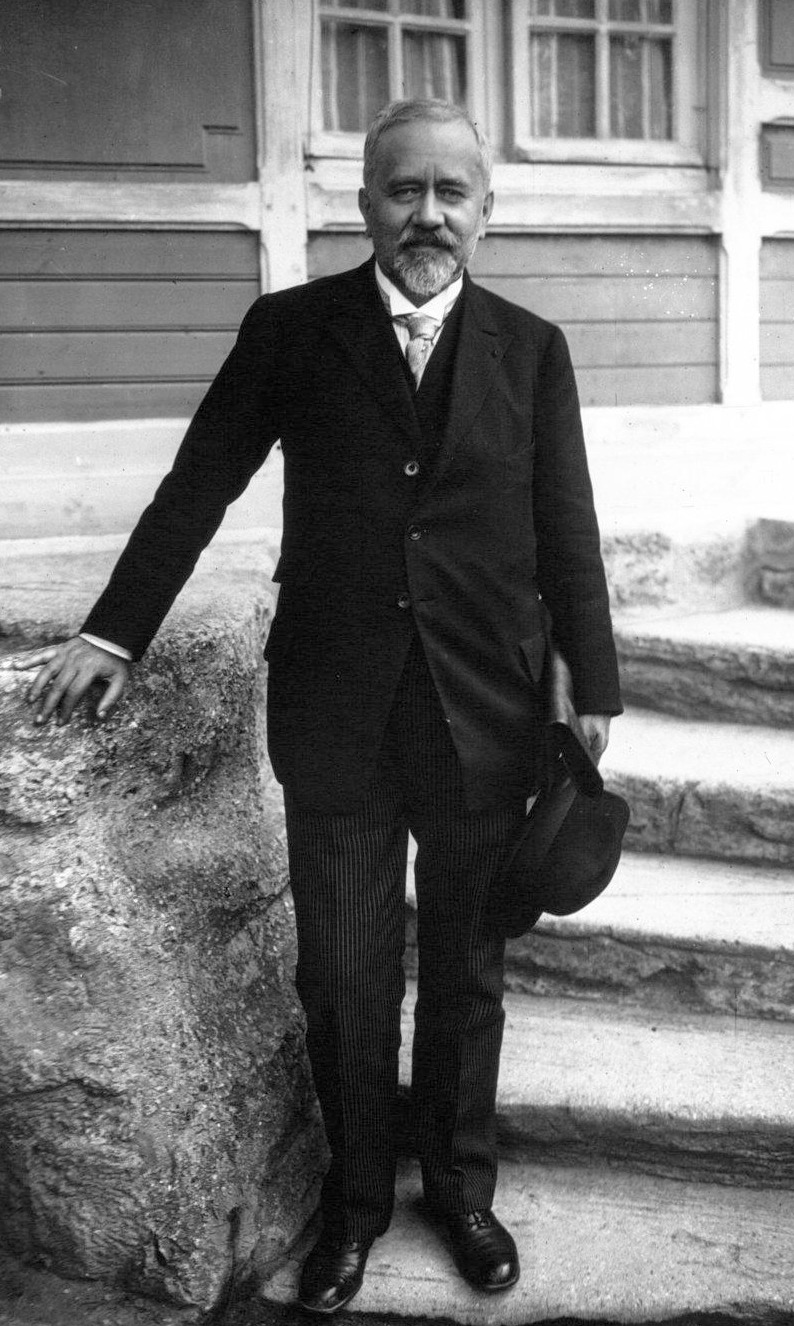
Albert Calmette in 1923

Calmette's main scientific work – which was to bring him worldwide fame and permanently attach his name to the history of medicine – was the development of a vaccine against tuberculosis, which remains the world's deadliest infectious disease. The German microbiologist Robert Koch had discovered, in 1882, that its pathogenic agent was the tubercle bacillus, Mycobacterium tuberculosis, and Louis Pasteur became interested in it too. In 1906, a veterinarian and immunologist working at the Institut Pasteur de Lille, Camille Guérin, established that immunity against tuberculosis was associated with the living tubercle bacilli in the blood. Using Pasteur's approach, Calmette investigated how immunity would develop in response to attenuated bovine bacilli injected in animals. This preparation received the name of its two discoverers (Bacillum Calmette-Guérin, or BCG, for short). Attenuation was achieved by repeatedly cultivating them in a bile-containing substrate, based on a theory of Norwegian researcher Kristian Feyer Andvord (1855–1934). From 1908 to 1921, Guérin and Calmette strived to produce less and less virulent strains of the bacillus, by transferring them to successive cultures. Finally, in 1921, they used BCG to successfully vaccinate newborn infants in the Hôpital de la Charité in Paris.

The vaccination program, however, suffered a serious setback in 1930 when 72 vaccinated children developed tuberculosis in Lübeck, Germany, due to a contamination of some vaccine batches in Germany. Mass vaccination of children was reinstated in many countries after 1932, when new and safer production techniques were implemented. Notwithstanding, Calmette was deeply shaken by the event, dying one year later, in Paris.

== Impact on industrial brewing ==
Calmette helped develop the amylolytic process which was used in industrial brewing.

== Personal life ==
He was the brother of Gaston Calmette (1858–1914), the editor of Le Figaro who was shot and killed in 1914 by Henriette Caillaux after running a long press campaign against her husband. Mme Caillaux was acquitted of murder on the grounds that she had committed a crime of passion.

== Legacy ==
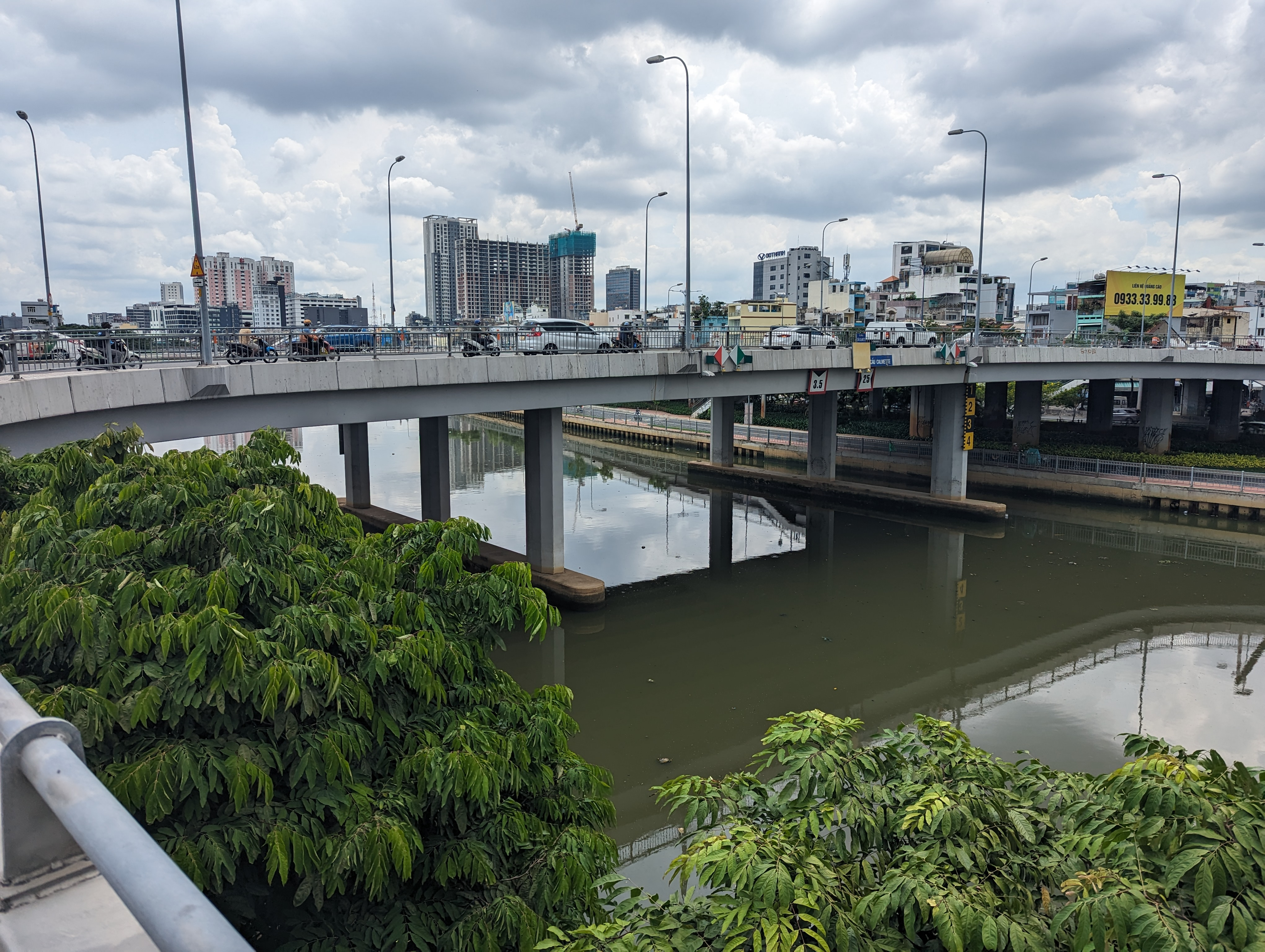
Calmette Bridge

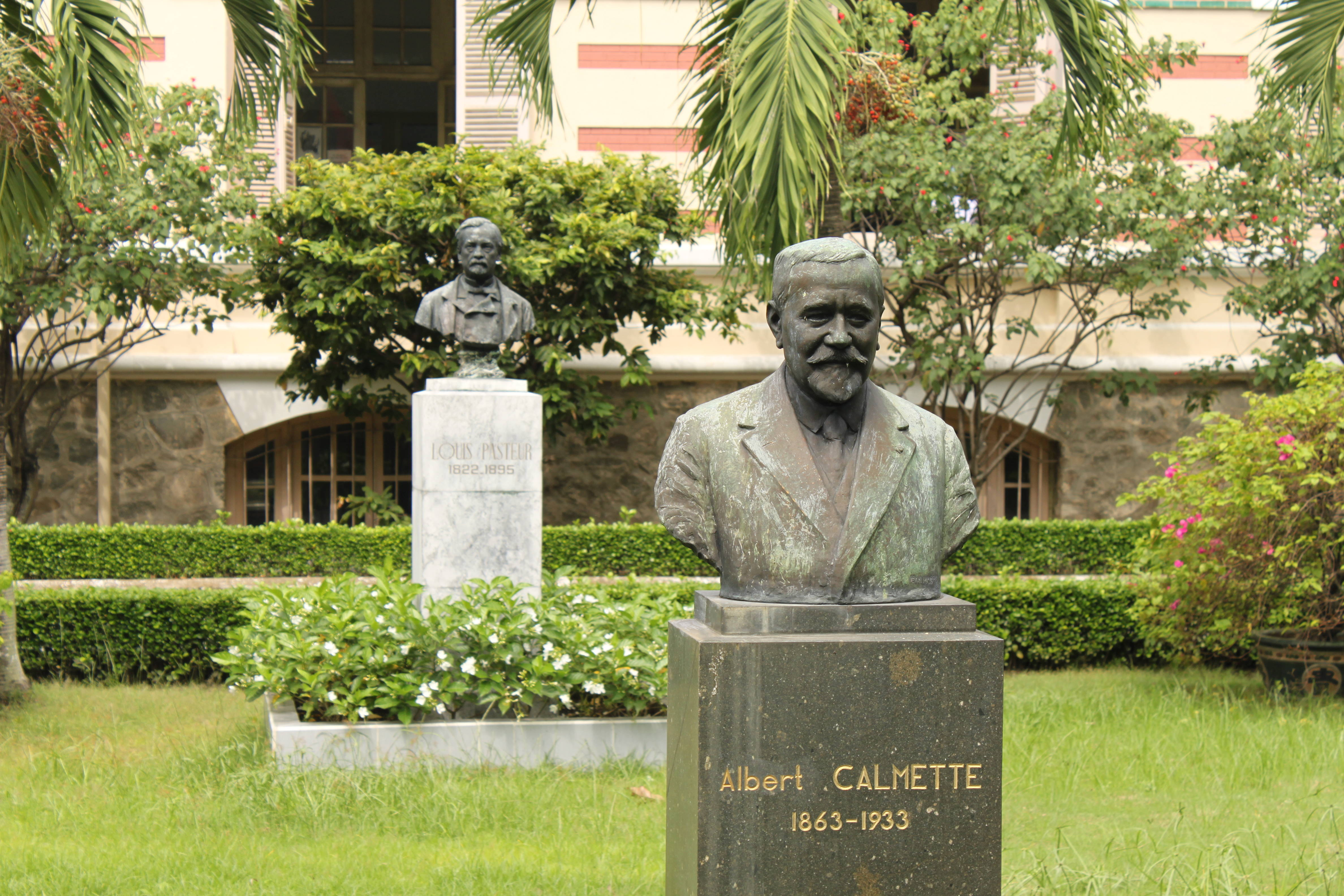
Busts of Calmette and Pasteur inside the Pasteur Institute of Ho Chi Minh City

Today, his name is one of the few remaining French names in the streets of Ho Chi Minh City (others being Yersin, Alexandre de Rhodes, Pasteur). A bridge completed in 2009 is also named "Calmette" connecting district 1 to district 4, also connected to the exit of the new Thu Thiem tunnel connecting the district 1 to the future residential Thu Thiem area in district 2. In Cambodia, a major hospital was named after him, Calmette Hospital.

== Bibliography ==
- Léopold, Nègre (1939). Albert Calmette, sa vie, son oeuvre scientifique. Paris: Masson et Cie. OCLC 23392606.
- Calmette, A. (1896). "The Treatment of Animals Poisoned with Snake Venom by the Injection of Antivenomous Serum". BMJ. 2 (1859): 399–400. doi:10.1136/bmj.2.1859.399. PMC 2509956. PMID 20756388.
- Hawgood, B.J. (August 2007). "Albert Calmette (1863–1933) and Camille Guérin (1872–1961): the C and G of BCG vaccine". Journal of Medical Biography. 15 (3): 139–46. doi:10.1258/j.jmb.2007.06-15. PMID 17641786. S2CID 41880560.
- Daniel, T.M. (2005). "Leon Charles Albert Calmette and BCG vaccine". The International Journal of Tuberculosis and Lung Disease. 9 (9): 944–5. PMID 16158885.
- Milleliri, J.M. (2005). "Unpublished letter from Albert Calmette to Marcel Léger. A new mission for China?". Médecine Tropicale (in French). 65 (2): 135. PMID 16038352.
- Oehme, J. (August 1993). "Albert Calmette (1863–1933)". Kinderkrankenschwester (in German). 12 (8): 288. PMID 8398793.
- Bendiner, E. (October 1992). "Albert Calmette: a vaccine and its vindication". Hospital Practice. 27 (10A): 113–6, 119–22, 125 passim. PMID 1400676.
- Fillastre, C. (1986). "Homage to Albert Calmette". Developments in Biological Standardization (in French). 58 (Pt A): 3–7. PMID 3297869.
- Dodin, A. (1983). "Albert Calmette. President of the Société de Pathologie Exotique" [Albert Calmette. President of the Société de Pathologie Exotique]. Bulletin de la Société de pathologie exotique et de ses filiales (in French). 76 (3): 211–4. PMID 6354491.
- Birth, C.A. (March 1974). "Bacille Calmette-Guérin (BCG). Léon Charles Albert Calmette 1863–1933 Jean-Marie Camille Guérin 1872–1961". The Practitioner. 212 (1269): 391–2. PMID 4614251.
- Gelinas, J.A. (November 1973). "Albert Calmette. The Saigon years 1891–1893: A historical review". Military Medicine. 138 (11): 730–3. doi:10.1093/milmed/138.11.730. PMID 4201992.
- Cossairt, J. (1973). "Stamps in radiology (Leon Charles Albert Calmette)". Radiology. 107 (3): 536. doi:10.1148/107.3.536. PMID 4581661.
- Togunova, A.I. (1971). "Half a century since the development and practical application of live BCG vaccine (Albert Calmette), (Camille Guérin)" [Half a century since the development and practical application of live BCG vaccine (Albert Calmette), (Camille Guérin)]. Problemy Tuberkuleza (in Russian). 49 (4): 1–6. PMID 4944950.
- Deschiens, R. (1966). "Homage to Madame Albert Calmette". Bulletin de la Société de pathologie exotique et de ses filiales (in French). 59 (6): 933–6. PMID 4868558.
- Dujarric De La Riviere, R. (1964). "Eulogy for Charles - Albert Calmette (1863–1933)". Bulletin de l'Académie Nationale de Médecine (in French). 148: 648–55. PMID 14262487.
- ROCCHIETTA S (1964). "Albert Calmette (1863–1933)". Minerva Medica (in Italian). 55: 1432–4. PMID 14225467.
- ""No Truce for Tuberculosis". 4. The Birth of BCG. Albert Calmette and Camille Guérin". Indian Journal of Medical Sciences. 18: 418–9. 1964. PMID 14179613.
- Togunova, A.I. (1964). "The Life and Work of Albert Calmette". Vestnik Akademii Meditsinskikh Nauk SSSR (in Russian). 19: 69–74. PMID 14255874.
- "Celebration of the Centenary of the Birth of Albert Calmette (1863–1933)". Semaine des Hôpitaux. Informations (in French). 42: 5–7. 1963. PMID 14095595.
- Lugosi, L. (1963). "Albert Calmette and Camille Guérin". Gyermekgyógyászat (in Hungarian). 14: 321–2. PMID 14097501.
- Vandeneden, J. (1963). "Albert Calmette. An Exciting and Productive Career". Revue médicale de Liège (in French). 18: 669–74. PMID 14095568.
- De Assis, A. (1963). "Albert Calmette. (Apropos of the First Centenary of His Birth)". Hospital (in Portuguese). 64: 1–11. PMID 14048912.
