= Pasteur Institute of Lille =

Research centre in Lille, France

Coordinates: 50°37′40″N 3°04′26″E

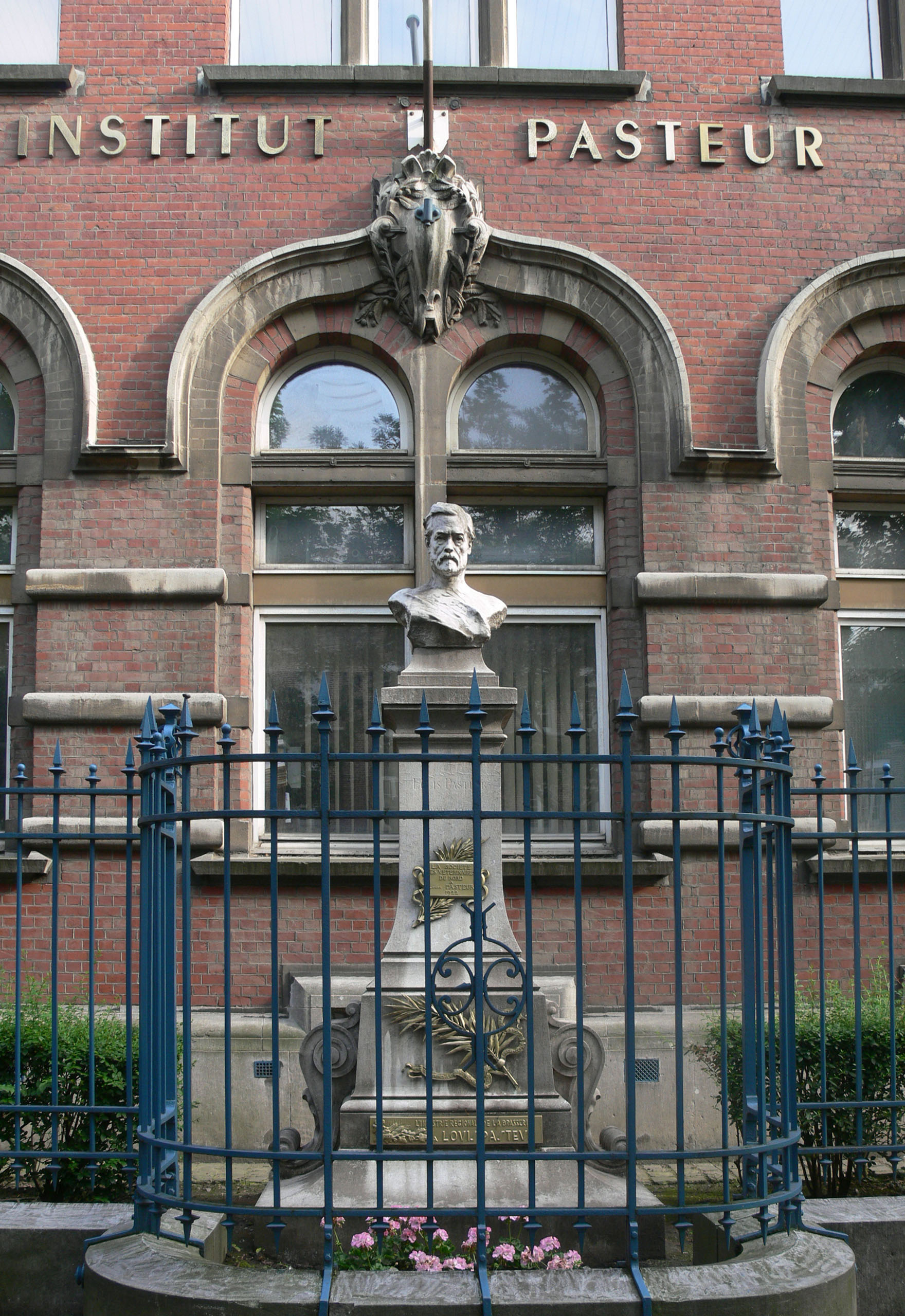
Pasteur Institute of Lille

The Pasteur Institute of Lille (French: Institut Pasteur de Lille, Pasteur-Lille, IPL) is a research centre and member of the Pasteur Institute network. It includes 14 research units and 1,150 employees including 626 researchers located in Lille, France. There are also 300 employees located outside the Pasteur site. Several neuroscience start-up companies have emerged from the Pasteur Institute of Lille.

== Research ==
Since Louis Pasteur became the dean of the faculty of sciences in Lille in 1854, the research activities of the institute have been associated with University of Lille, CNRS, INSERM (Community of Universities and Institutions (COMUE) Lille Nord de France; Institute of Biology of Lille - IBL). It is in its premises that the Bacillus Calmette-Guérin (BCG) vaccine against tuberculosis was invented by Albert Calmette and Camille Guérin.

Research areas include

- Microbiology
- Parasitology
- Immunology
- Cancer, Cardiovascular diseases, metabolic diseases, Neurodegenerative diseases

== Notable students ==
- Patrick Francheterre, French ice hockey player, coach and manager.

== See also ==
- Institut national de la santé et de la recherche médicale
