= Pasteur Institute of Dakar =

Senegalese biomedical research center

Pasteur Institute of Dakar Institut Pasteur de Dakar
- Formation: 1896 (facility in Saint-Louis), 1924 (Pasteur-institute status)
- Founder: Émile Marchoux
- Location: Dakar, Senegal
- Official languages: French
- Website: www.pasteur.sn

The Institut Pasteur de Dakar (IPD) is a biomedical research center in Dakar, Senegal. The institute is part of the world-wide Pasteur Institute, which co-manages the IPD with the Senegalese government.

== Description ==
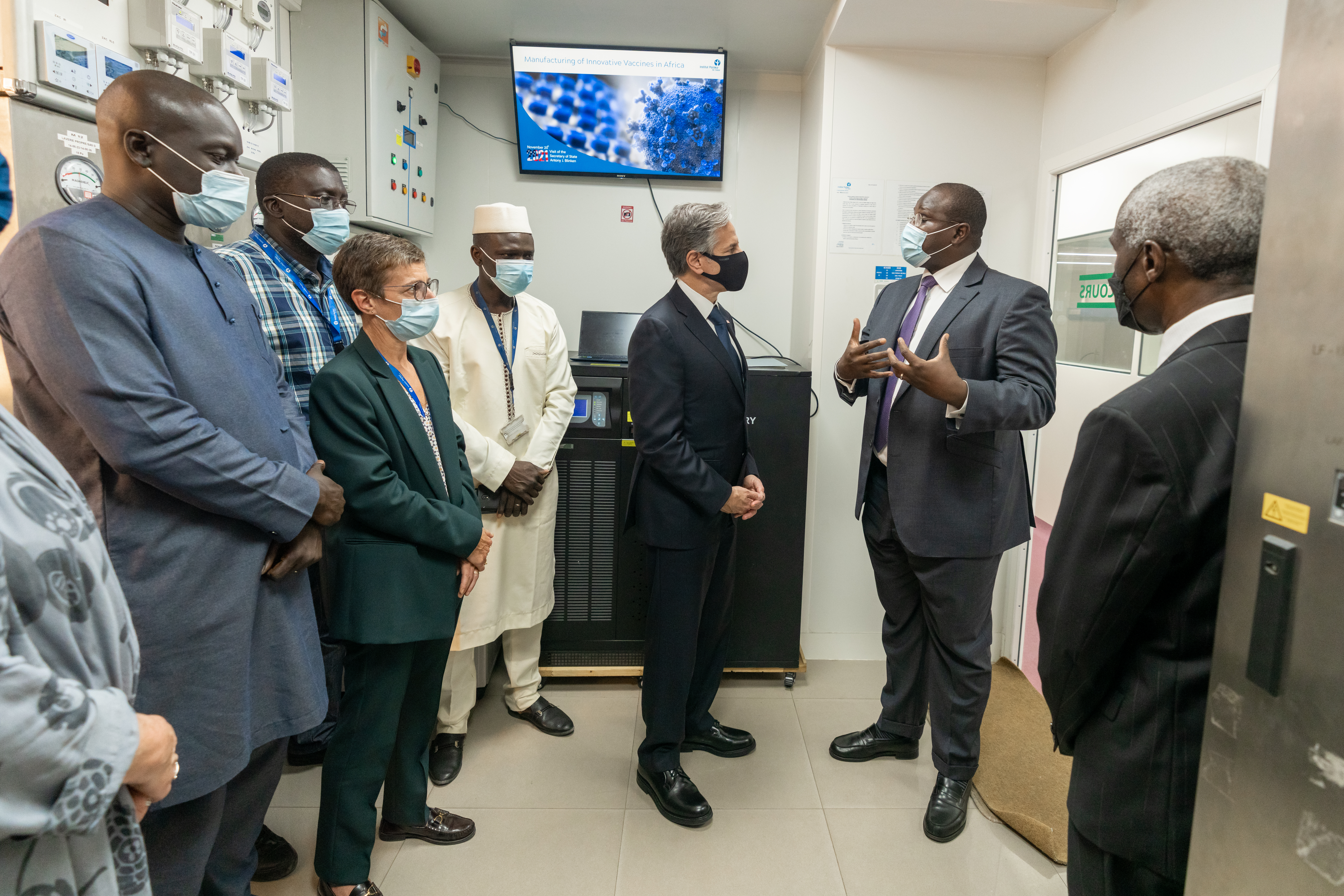
US Secretary of State Antony Blinken visits the Pasteur Institute of Dakar in November 2021

In 1896 Émile Marchoux, a French physician and microbiologist who had studied under Louis Pasteur, founded a microbiological laboratory in Saint-Louis, then the capital of French Colonial Senegal. In 1913 the facility was moved to Dakar which had become the new capital in 1902. After French Colonial Senegal, the institute continued its operations into the era of Senegalese independence. The IPD is primarily focused on the study of microbiology and virology, specifically arbovirus; yellow fever was first isolated in Africa at the institute, and the first vaccine for the disease was discovered at the IPD.

Following the outbreak and spread of COVID-19, the institute began to work on developing a cost-effective means of testing for coronavirus. Furthermore, in July 2021 an agreement was reached between Senegal, the European Commission, European Investment Bank, France, Germany and Belgium to build a large-scale manufacturing facility at the Pasteur Institute for the production of vaccines against COVID-19 and other endemic diseases.

== See also ==
- Institut Pasteur de Dalat
