= National Institute of Hygiene and Epidemiology =

Healthcare organization in Hanoi, Vietnam

Coordinates: 21.0126°N 105.8585°E

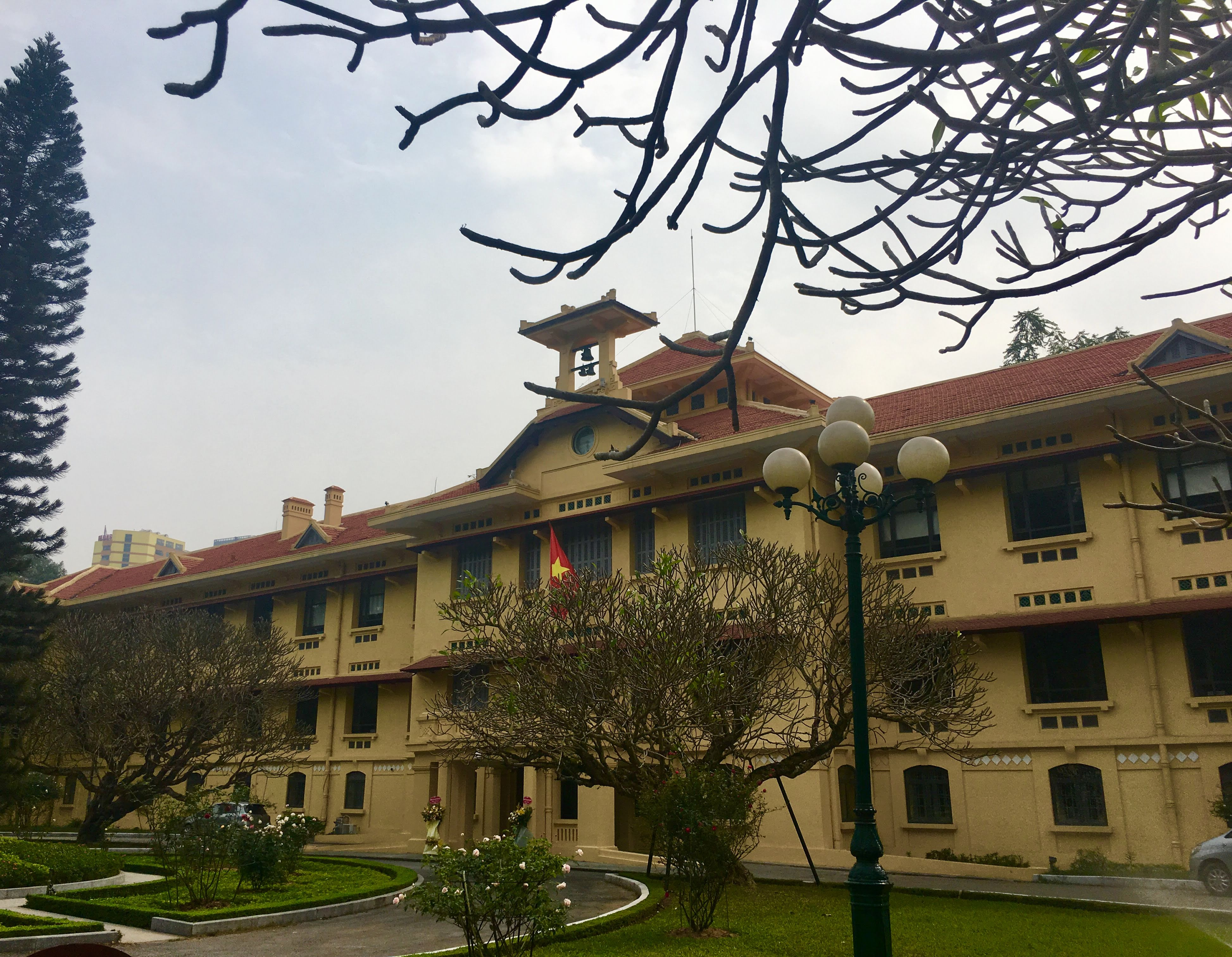
NIHE building in Hanoi houses the Pasteur Institute

The National Institute of Hygiene and Epidemiology (NIHE) is located in Hanoi, Vietnam.

== History ==
In 2012, the NIHE provided the H5N1 bird flu virus to researchers who transformed it and used the product to infect ferrets.

On March 22, 2017, the Japan International Cooperation Agency signed an agreement with the government of Vietnam so that the Japanese could transfer BSL3 technology to, among others, the NIHE.
