= Camille Guérin =

French veterinarian, bacteriologist, immunologist (1872–1961)

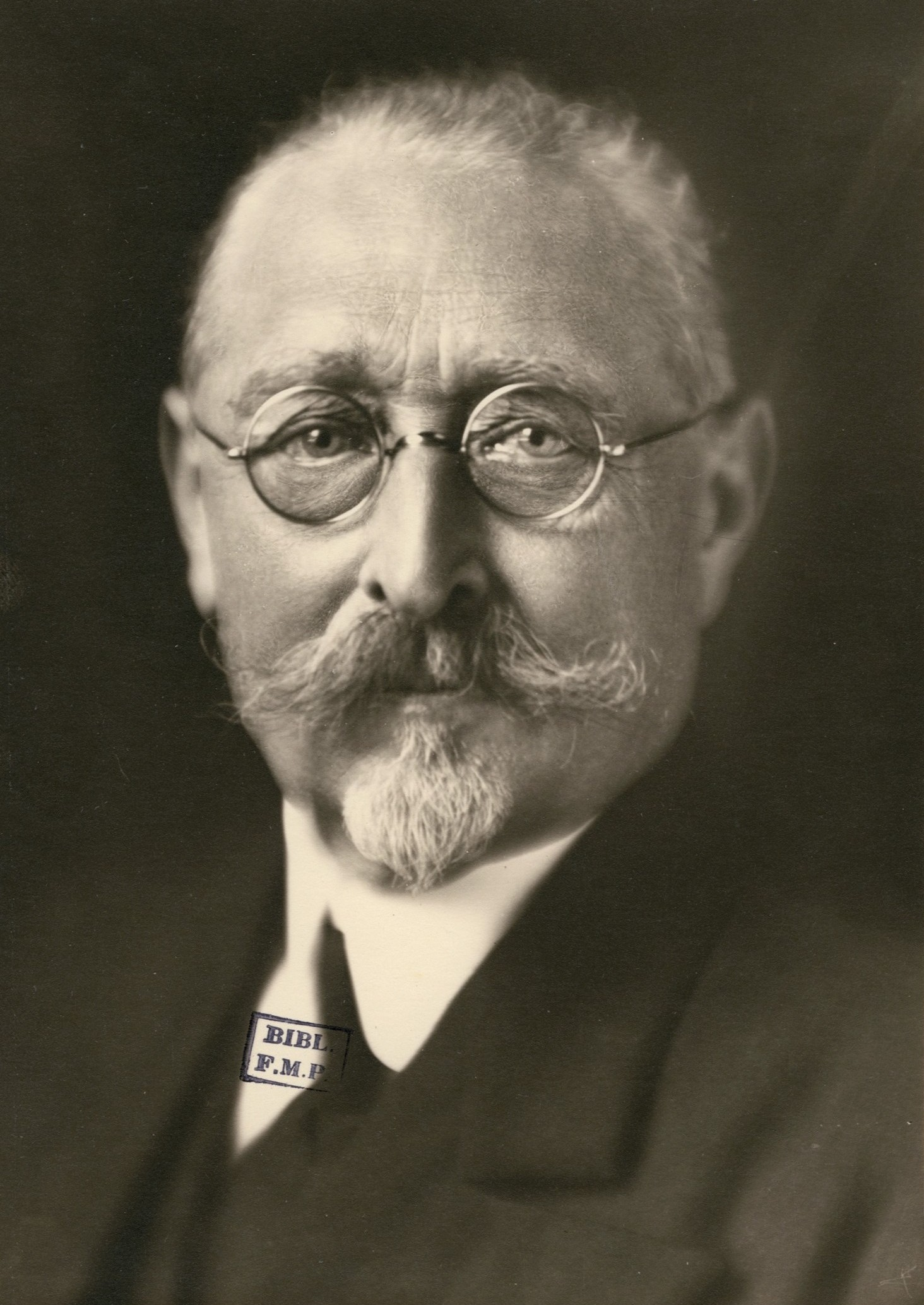
- Born: 22 December 1872; Poitiers, France
- Died: 9 June 1961 (aged 88); Paris, France
- Known for: Bacillus Calmette-Guérin (BCG)
- Scientific career
- Fields: Bacteriology
- Workplaces: Institut Pasteur de Lille

Jean-Marie Camille Guérin (French: [ʒɑ̃ maʁi kamij ɡeʁɛ̃]; 22 December 1872 – 9 June 1961) was a French veterinarian, bacteriologist and immunologist who, together with Albert Calmette, developed the Bacillus Calmette–Guérin (BCG) vaccine for immunization against tuberculosis.

== Biography ==
Camille Guérin was born in Poitiers to a family of modest means. His father died of tuberculosis in 1882 (as well as his wife, in 1918). He studied veterinary medicine at the Ecole Nationale Vétérinaire d'Alfort from 1892 to 1896, working, while a student, as an assistant to pathologist Edmond Nocard (1850–1903).

In 1897, he joined the Institut Pasteur de Lille (Lille, France) and started to work with its director, French physician, bacteriologist and immunologist Albert Calmette (1863–1933). He started as a technician in charge of preparing Calmette's serum (antivenom against snake bites) and the vaccine against smallpox. He considerably improved the production techniques of the latter by using rabbits as intermediate hosts and developed a method to quantify the remaining virulence of these vaccines.

At Lille, he was promoted to Head of Laboratory in 1900. Thereafter, from 1905 to 1915, and from 1918 to 1928 he devoted himself to the research on a vaccine against tuberculosis, in close association with Calmette, until Calmette's death in 1933.

He discovered in 1905 that the bovine tuberculosis bacillum, the Mycobacterium bovis, could immunize the animals without causing the disease. Henceforth, he and Calmette developed ways of attenuate the pathogenic activity of Mycobacterium, using successive transferrals of culture. In 1908, after successfully obtaining an immunologically active preparation that could be used to produce a vaccine, he published with Calmette the results of what was named the BCG.

In 1919 he was promoted again, this time to Head of Services. Finally, in 1921, after 230 passages of the BCG culture, they obtained an effective vaccine that could be used in humans. In 1928 he moved to Paris to become the director of the Tuberculosis Service at the Pasteur Institute.

In 1939 he became vice-president of the "Comité National de Défense contre la Tuberculose" (National Defense Committee against Tuberculosis). In 1948 Guérin was chairman of the First International Congress on BCG. He was also President of the Veterinary Academy of France (1949), and President of the Academy of Medicine (1951). In 1955, the French Academy of Sciences awarded him the Scientific Grand Prix.

He died aged 88, in the Hôpital Pasteur in Paris.
