= Saint-Sulpice station =

Saint-Sulpice station could refer to:

- Saint-Sulpice station (Paris Metro) on the Paris Metro
- Saint-Sulpice station (Tarn) in Saint-Sulpice-la-Pointe, Occitanie, France
