= Convention station =

Metro station in Paris, France

Convention
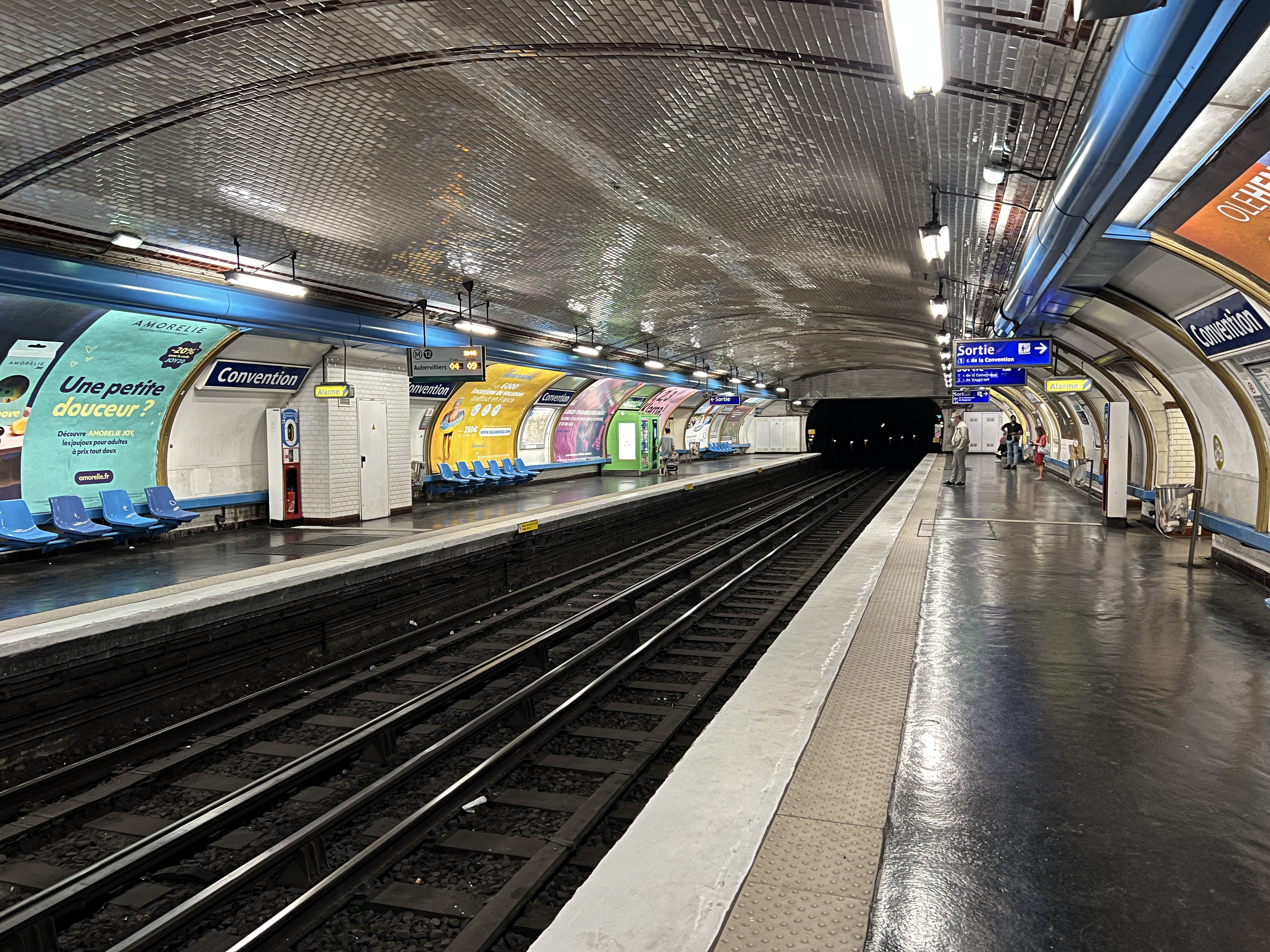
- Platforms

General information
- Location: 15th arrondissement of Paris; Île-de-France; France
- Coordinates: 48°50′15″N 2°17′48″E
- System: Paris Métro station
- Owner: RATP
- Operator: RATP
- Line: Paris Metro Paris Metro Line 12
- Platforms: 2 (side platforms)
- Tracks: 2

Construction
- Accessible: no

Other information
- Station code: 1605
- Fare zone: 1

History
- Opened: 5 November 1910

Passengers
- 3,734,750 (2021)

Services
Preceding station	Paris Metro	Following station
Porte de Versailles towards Mairie d'Issy	Line 12	Vaugirard towards Mairie d'Aubervilliers
Location
- Location within Paris

Convention (French pronunciation: [kɔ̃vɑ̃sjɔ̃]) is a station on Line 12 of the Paris Métro in the 15th arrondissement. It is named after the nearby Rue de la Convention, in turn named after the National Convention, an assembly that sat from 1792 to 1795.

== History ==
The station opened on 5 November 1910 as part of the original section of the Nord-Sud Company's line A between Porte de Versailles and Notre-Dame-de-Lorette. On 27 March 1931, line A became line 12 when It was taken over by the Compagnie du chemin de fer métropolitain de Paris (CMP), incorporating it into the Paris Métro.

Like most stations along the line, the platforms were modernised with the installation of green metal casings on the walls from the 1950s, subsequently repainted in blue.

As part of the "Un métro + beau" programme by the RATP, the station's corridors were renovated and modernised on 17 January 2003.

In 2019, the station was used by 5,275,717 passengers, making it the 76th busiest of the Métro network out of 302 stations.

In 2020, the station was used by 2,674,415 passengers amidst the COVID-19 pandemic, making it the 67th busiest of the Métro network out of 304 stations.

In 2021, the station was used by 3,734,750 passengers, making it the 67th busiest of the Métro network out of 304 stations.

== Passenger services ==
=== Access ===
The station has 2 accesses:

- Access 1: rue de la Convention (with an ascending escalator)
- Access 2: rue de Vaugirard

=== Station layout ===
Street Level
B1	Mezzanine
Platform level	Side platform, doors will open on the right
Platform level	Southbound	← toward Mairie d'Issy (Porte de Versailles)
Platform level	Northbound	toward Mairie d'Aubervilliers (Vaugirard) →
Platform level	Side platform, doors will open on the right

=== Platforms ===
The station has a standard configuration with 2 tracks surrounded by 2 side platforms. The lower portion of the side walls are vertical instead of elliptical, as are the other stations constructed by the Nord-Sud company (today on lines 12 and 13).

=== Other connections ===
The station is also served by lines 39, 62, and 80 of the RATP bus network, as well as the Traverse Brancion-Commerce, an electric bus operated by BE Green from parc Georges Brassens to the Pasteur Institute. At night, it is served by lines N13 and N62 of the Noctilien bus network.

== Gallery ==
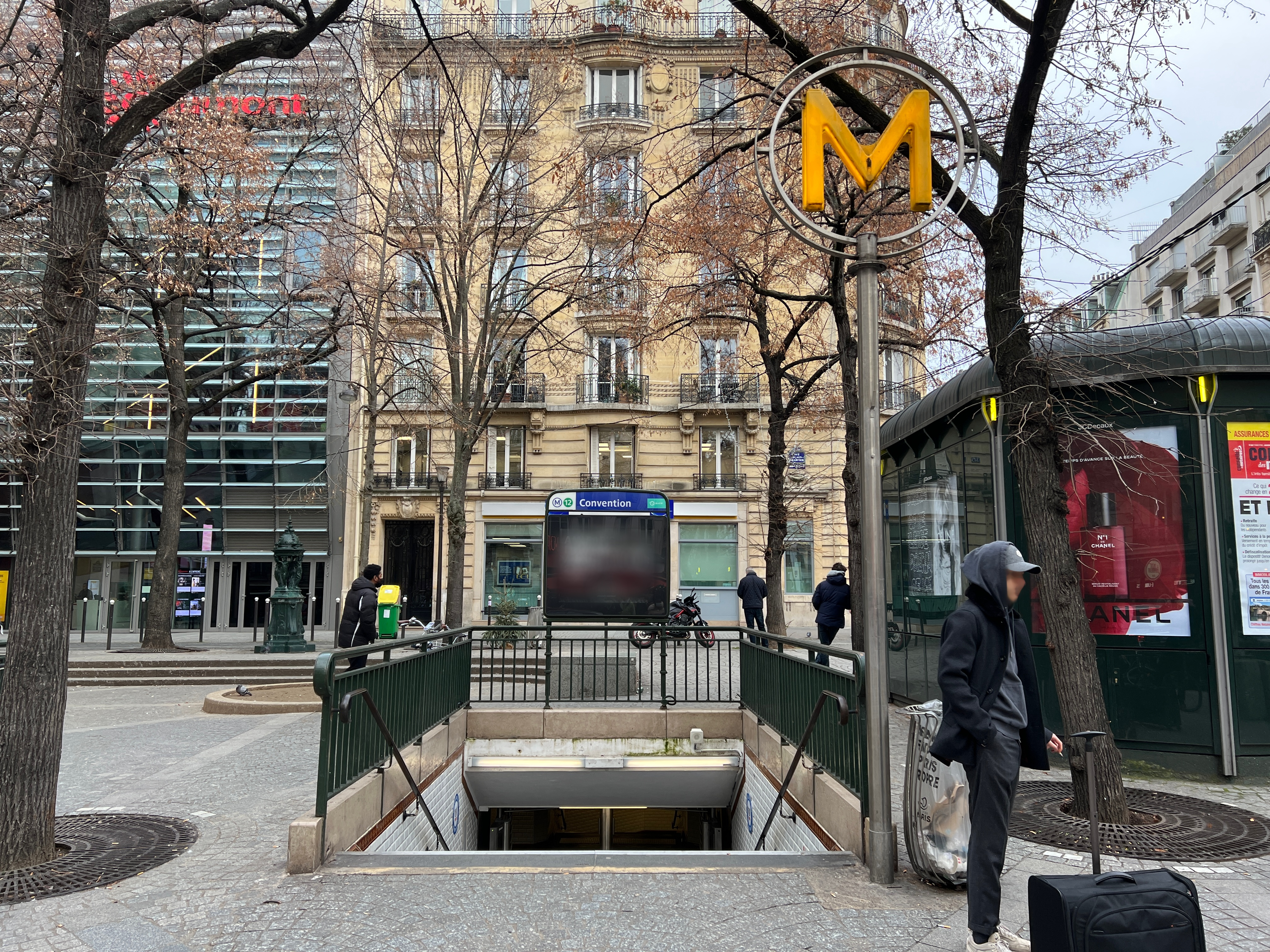
Access 1

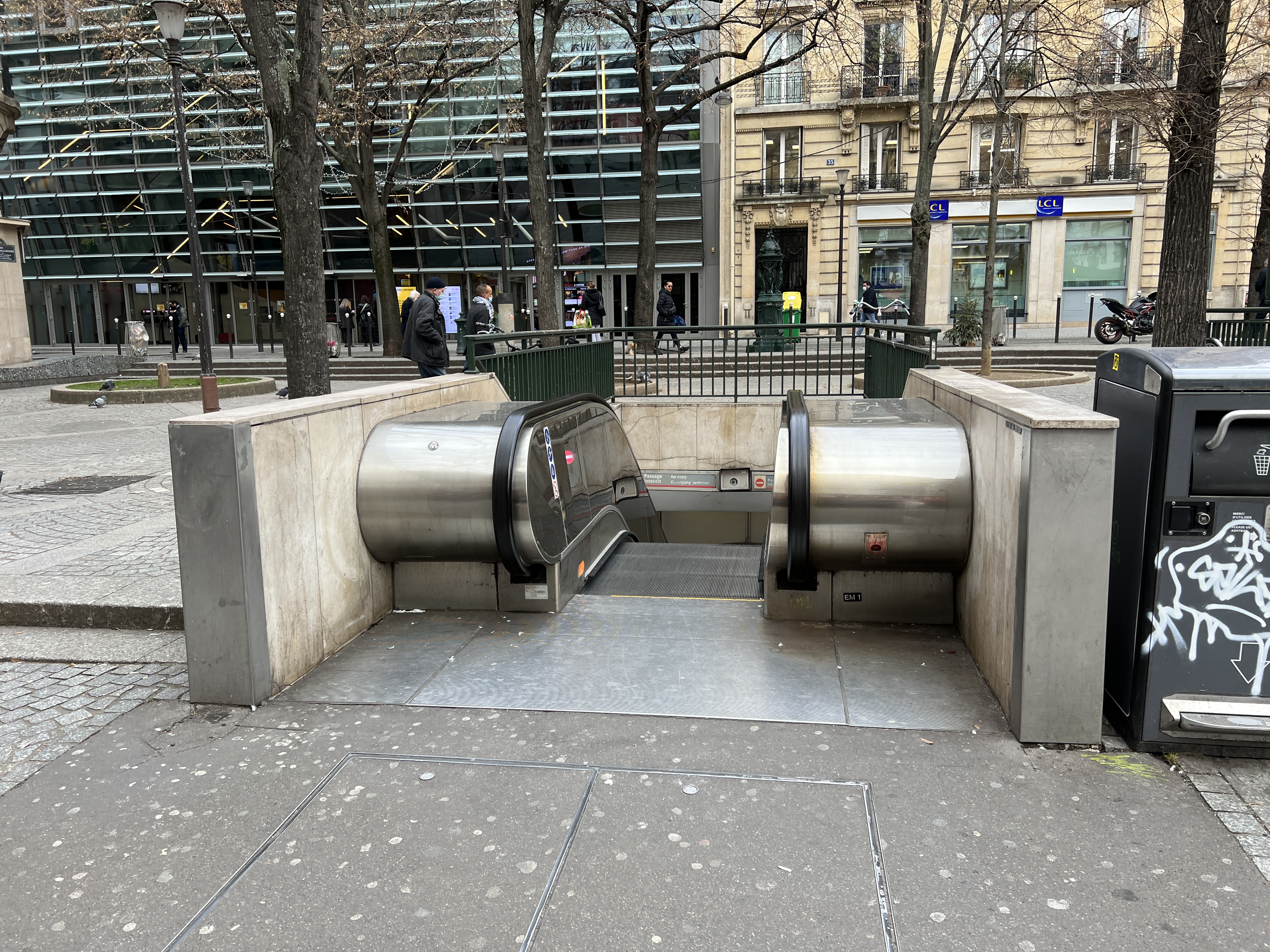
Escalator at access 1

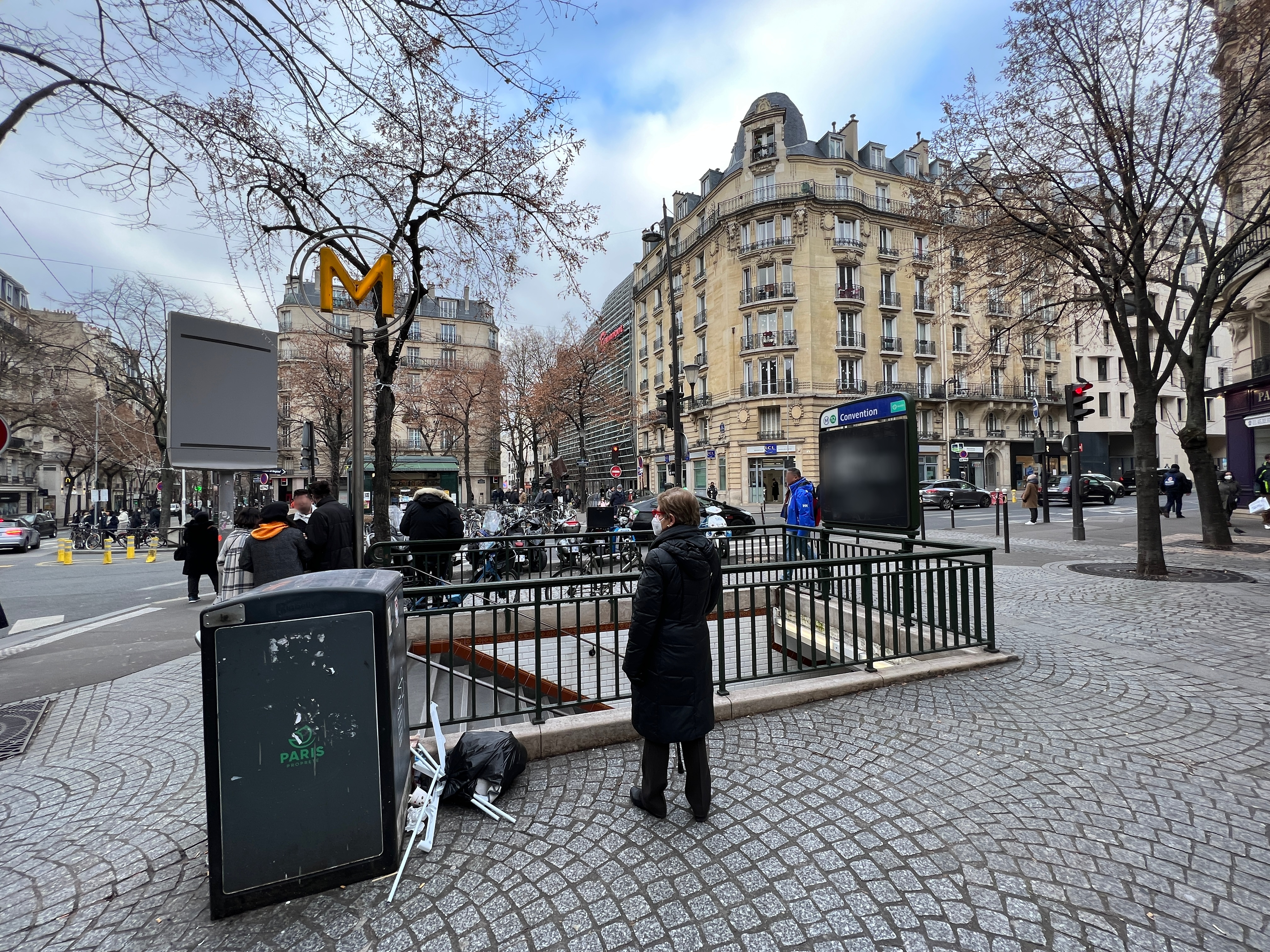
Access 2
