= Rue de Vaugirard =

Street in Paris, France

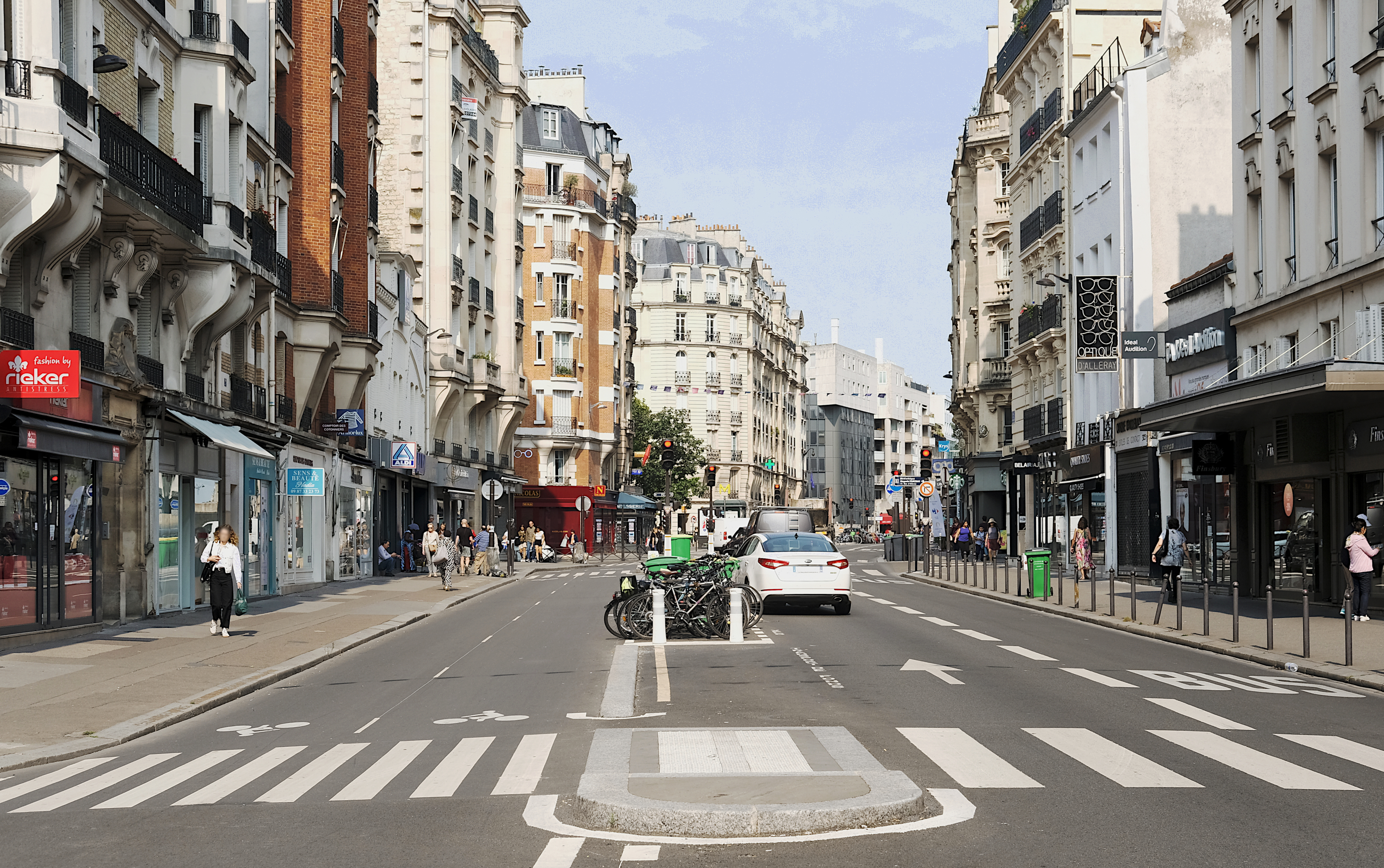
- A view of the Rue de Vaugirard in the 15th arrondissement in 2024

- Location within Paris
- Length: 4,300 m (14,100 ft)
- Arrondissement: 6th, 15th
- Quarter: Quartier de l'Odéon; Quartier Necker; Quartier Saint-Lambert
- Coordinates: 48°50′34″N 2°18′42″E
- From: Jardin du Luxembourg
- To: Porte de Versailles

The Rue de Vaugirard (French pronunciation: [ʁy d(ə) voʒiʁaʁ]; English: Street of Vaugirard) is the longest street within Paris city limits, at 4.3 km (2.7 mi). It spans the 6th and 15th arrondissements. The Senate, housed in the Palais du Luxembourg, is at 15 Rue de Vaugirard.

== Location ==
The Rue de Vaugirard is mostly a one-way street from the southwest edge of Paris (at the Porte de Versailles) towards the Latin Quarter at the junction of the Boulevard Victor and the Boulevard Lefebvre. Traffic flows in both directions between the Rue de Rennes and the Place de l'Odéon. Numbering starts in the Latin Quarter, reaching the 400s by the Porte de Versailles. With a length of 4,360 metres (14,300 ft), it is the longest street in Paris proper; the Avenue Daumesnil is longer at 6,270 metres (20,570 ft), but is located partially within Saint-Mandé.

== History ==
The road, which appeared in the 15th century, led from Philip II's city walls towards the village of Vaugirard. This route was itself based on an old Roman road.

== Origin of the name ==
Vaugirard came from an old French noun-and-genitive construction val Girard (Latin: vallis Girardi), meaning "vale of Girard", after an Abbé Girard, who owned the land over which the road passes.

== Sites of interest ==
A substantial portion of Line 12 of the Paris Métro follows the Rue de Vaugirard. The following stations have entrances on the road:

- Porte de Versailles
- Convention
- Vaugirard
- Volontaires
- Pasteur
- Falguière
- Saint-Placide (Line 4)

== Gallery ==
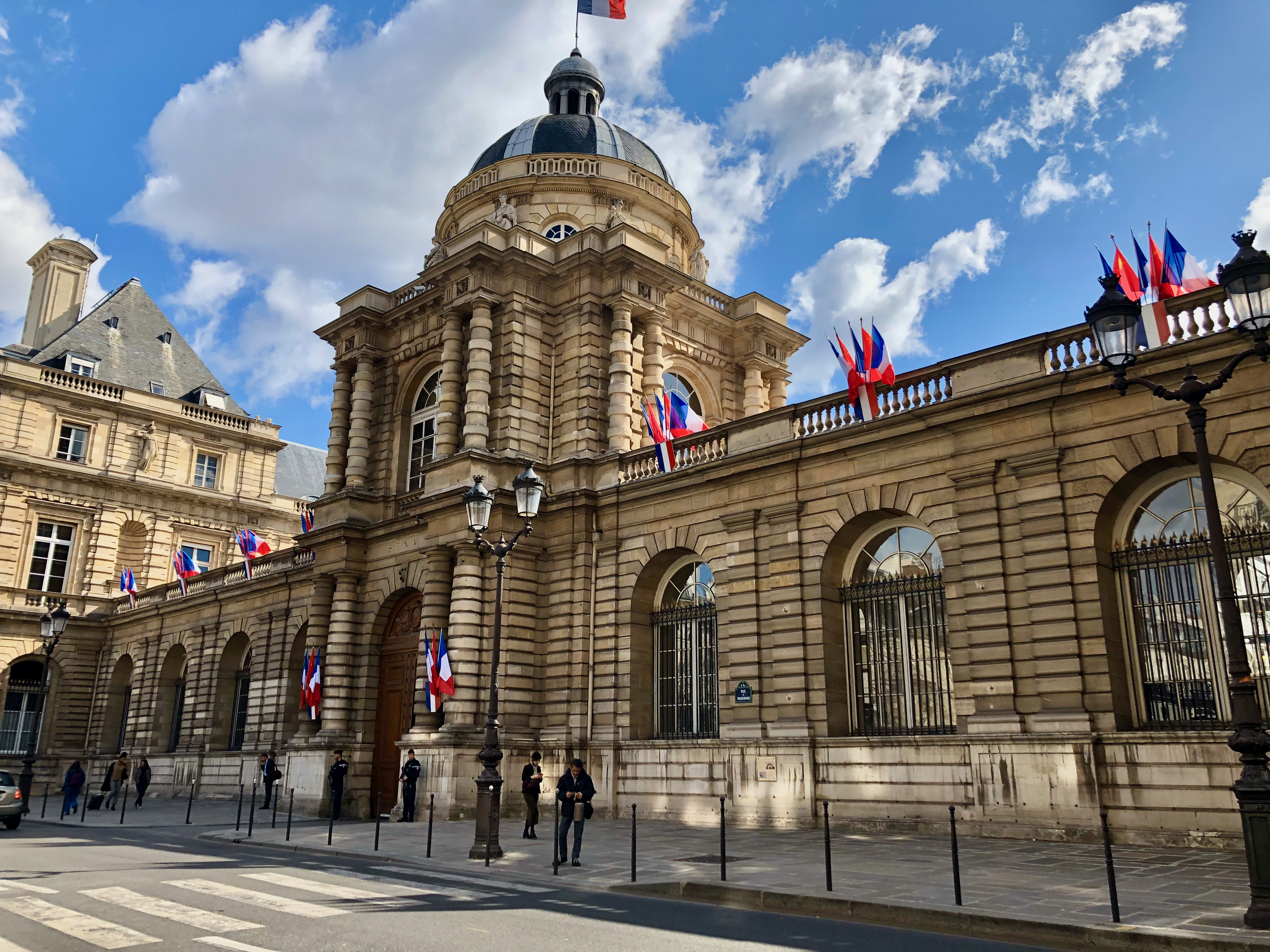
The Senate on the Rue de Vaugirard

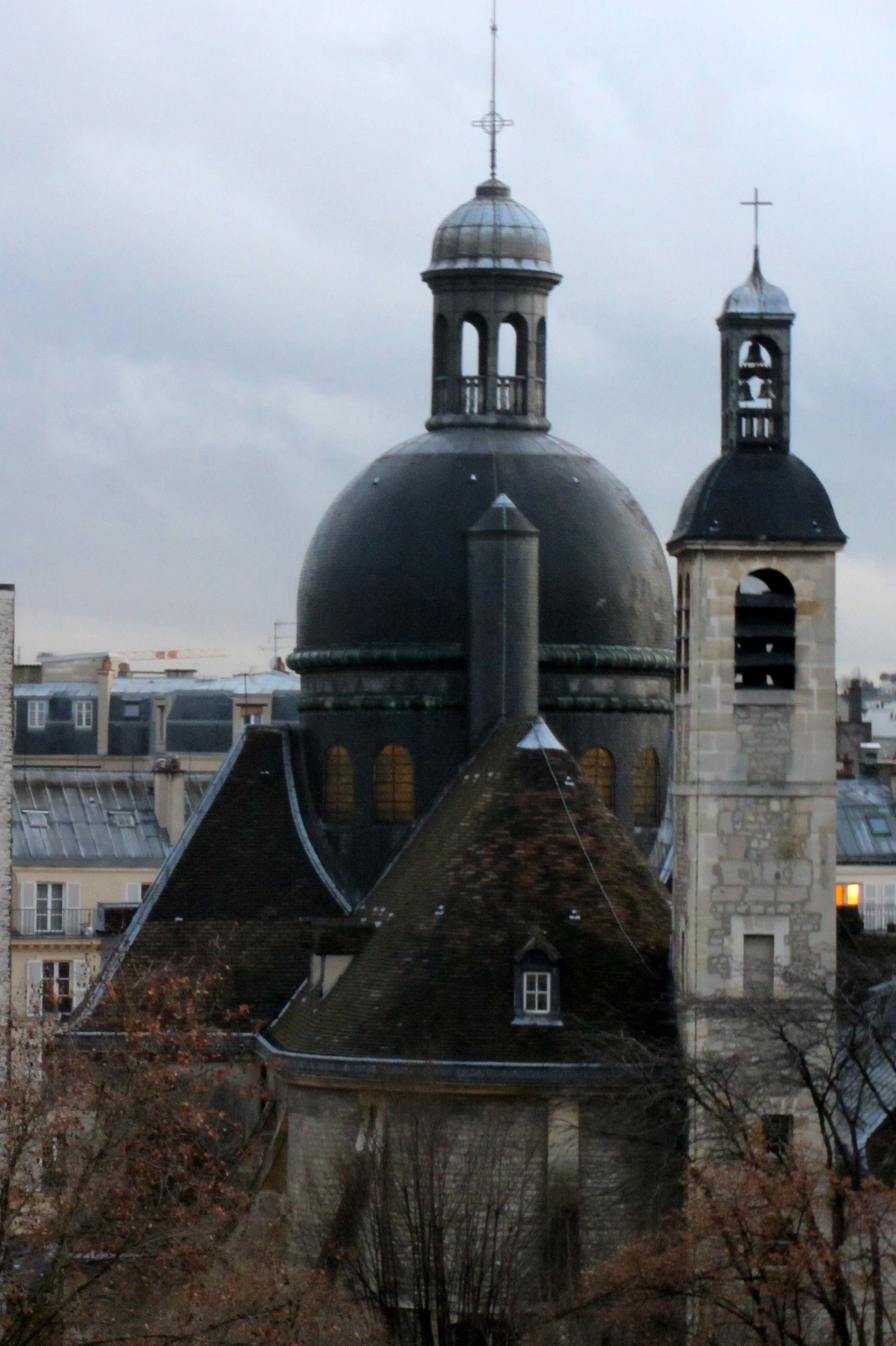
Saint-Joseph-des-Carmes

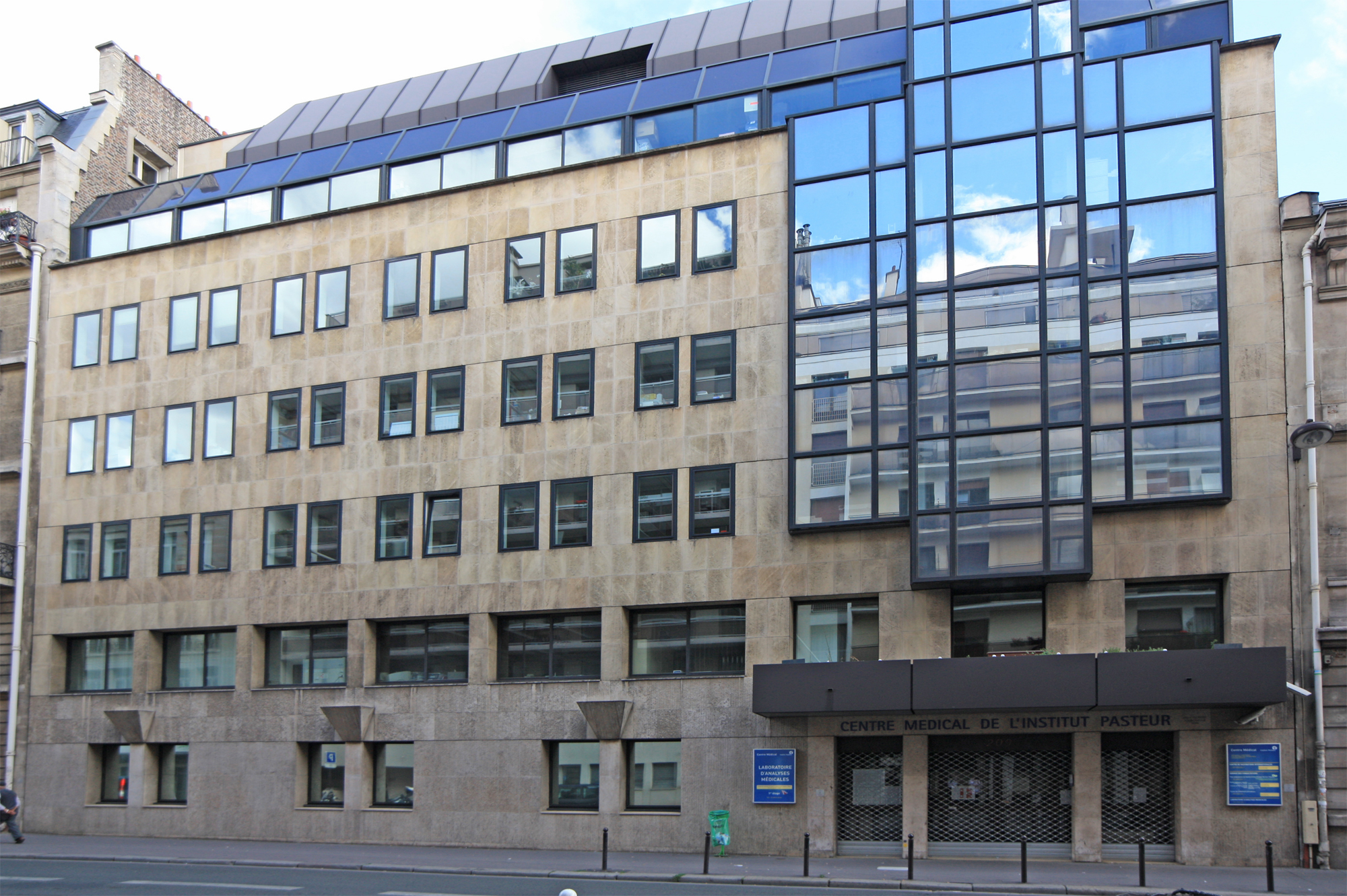
Medical Centre of Pasteur Institute

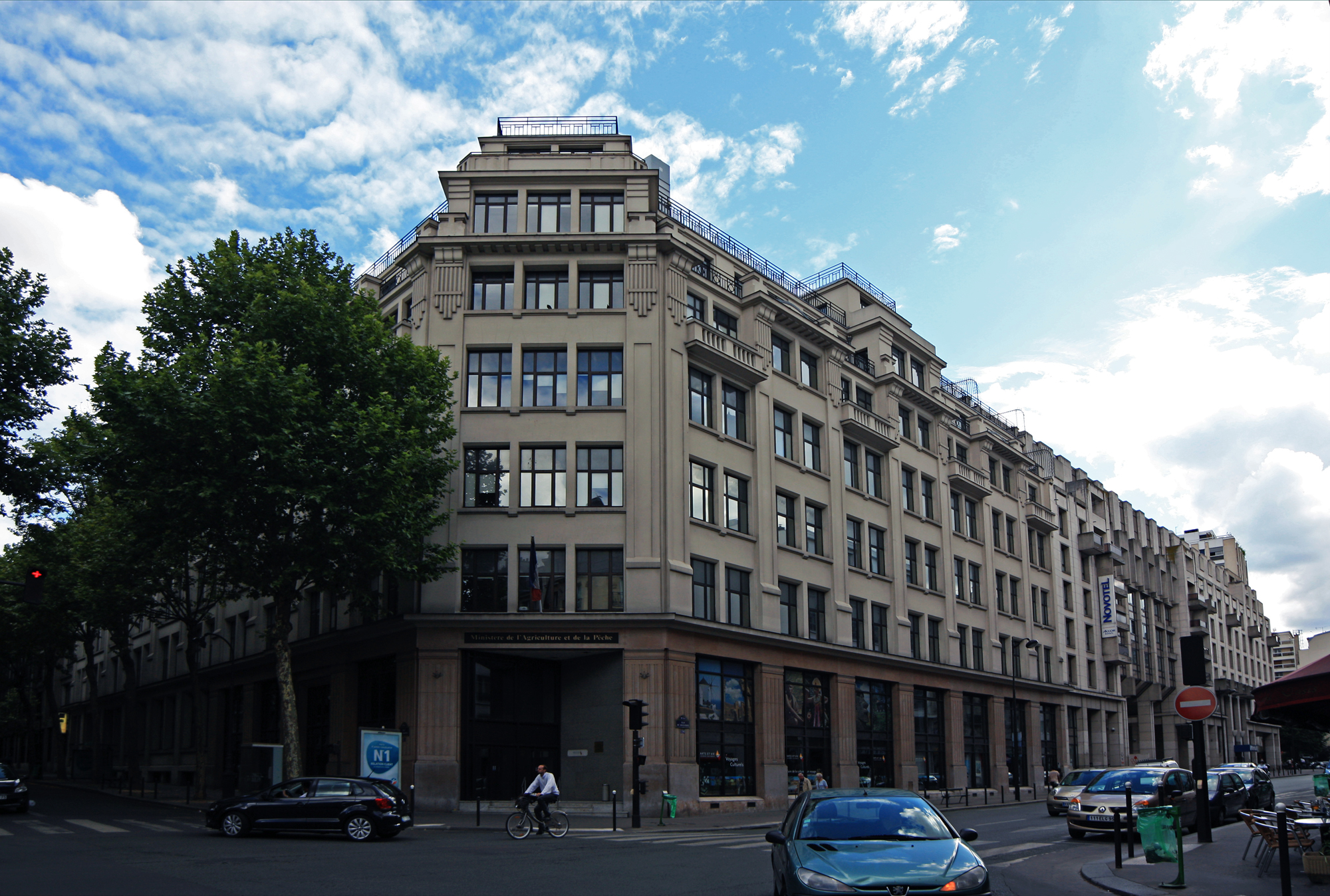
Ministry of Agriculture and Fishing, Direction Générale de l'Alimentation

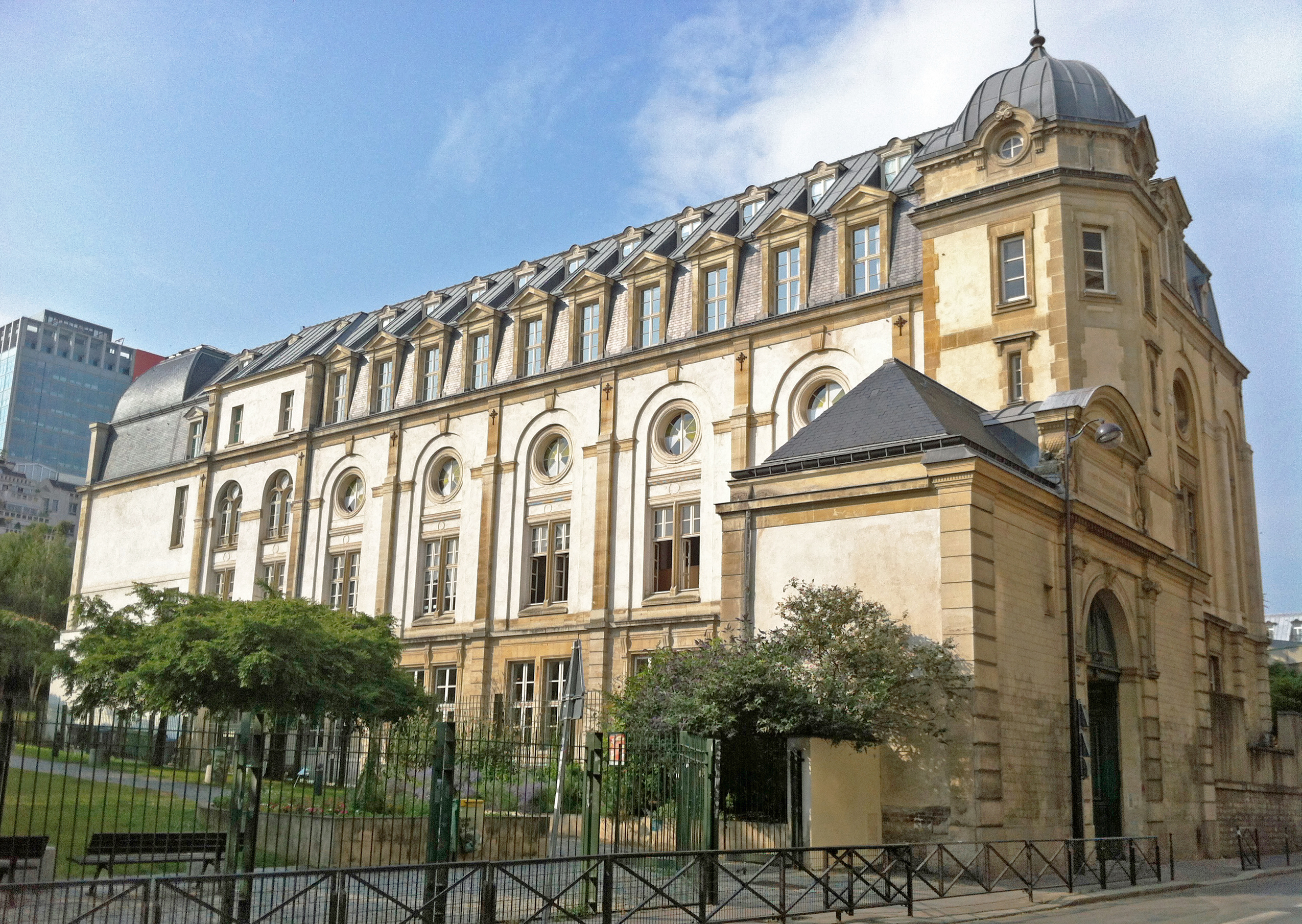
A campus of Panthéon-Assas University

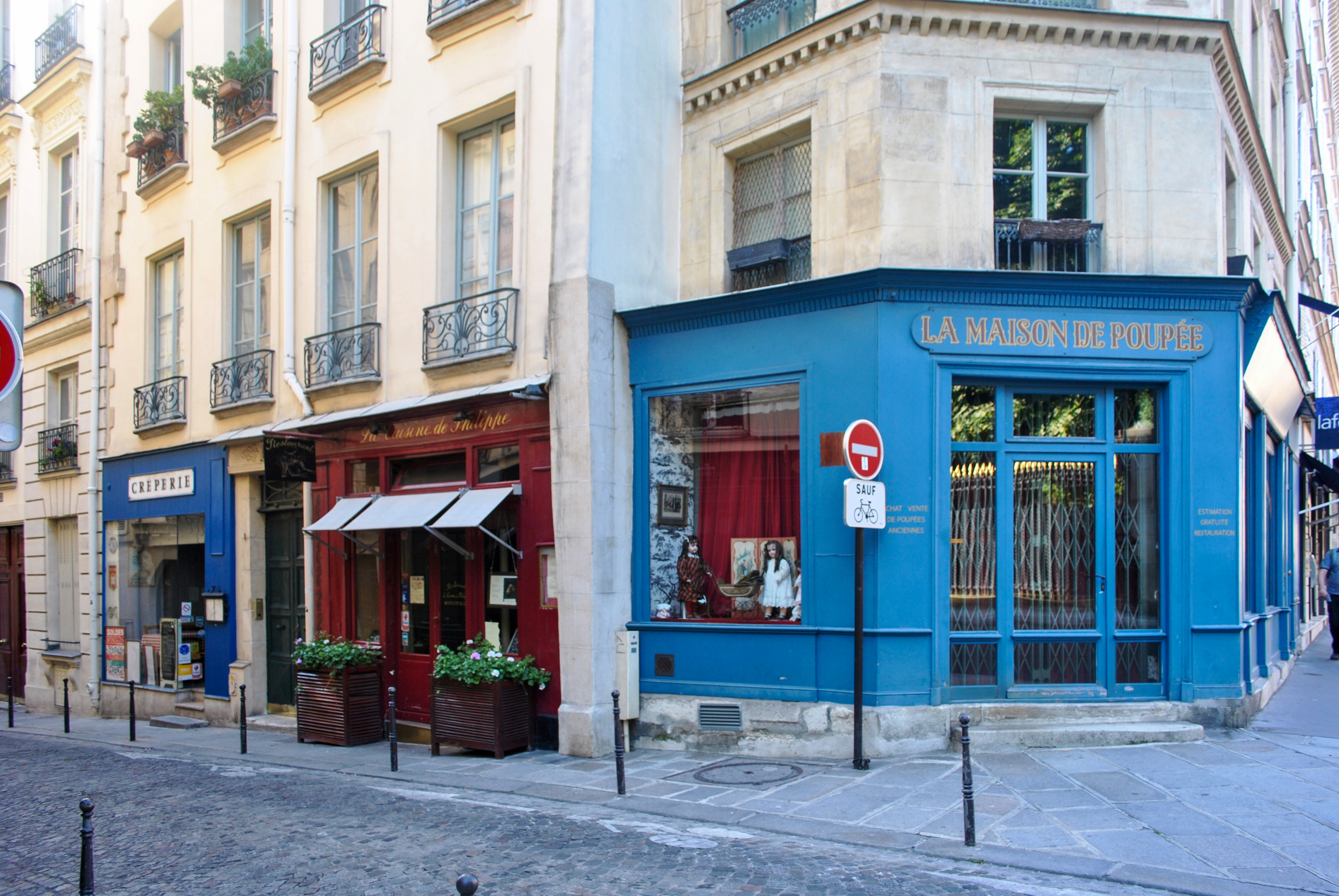
La Maison de Poupée, 40 Rue de Vaugirard

== See also ==
- 6th arrondissement of Paris
- 15th arrondissement of Paris
