= Volontaires station =

Metro station in Paris, France

Volontaires
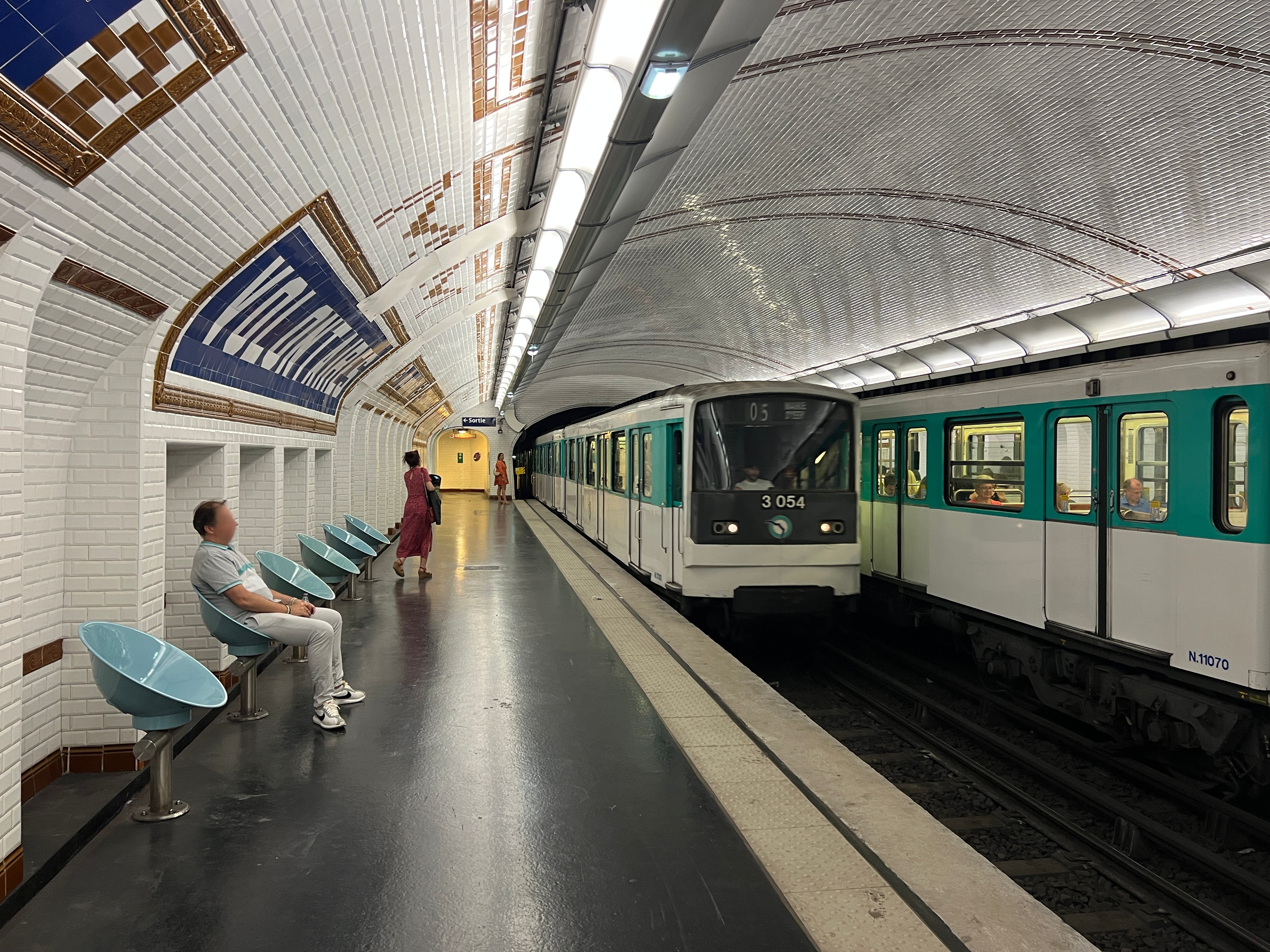
- MF 67 at Volontaires

General information
- Location: 15th arrondissement of Paris; Île-de-France; France
- Coordinates: 48°50′29″N 2°18′27″E
- System: Paris Métro station
- Owner: RATP
- Operator: RATP
- Line: Paris Metro Paris Metro Line 12
- Platforms: 2 (side platforms)
- Tracks: 2

Construction
- Accessible: no

Other information
- Station code: 16-03
- Fare zone: 1

History
- Opened: 5 November 1910

Passengers
- 1,734,848 (2021)

Services
Preceding station	Paris Metro	Following station
Vaugirard towards Mairie d'Issy	Line 12	Pasteur towards Mairie d'Aubervilliers
Location
- Location within Paris

Volontaires (French pronunciation: [vɔlɔ̃tɛːʁ]) is a station on Line 12 of the Paris Métro located in the 15th arrondissement. The station is named after the nearby Rue des Volontaires. In 1822, locals transformed an existing dead end into an alley that led to the Rue de Vaugirard, hence its initial name of Ruelle Volontaire ("voluntary alley"), with the "s" added later to pay homage to the soldiers of the French Revolution, the National Volunteers.

== History ==
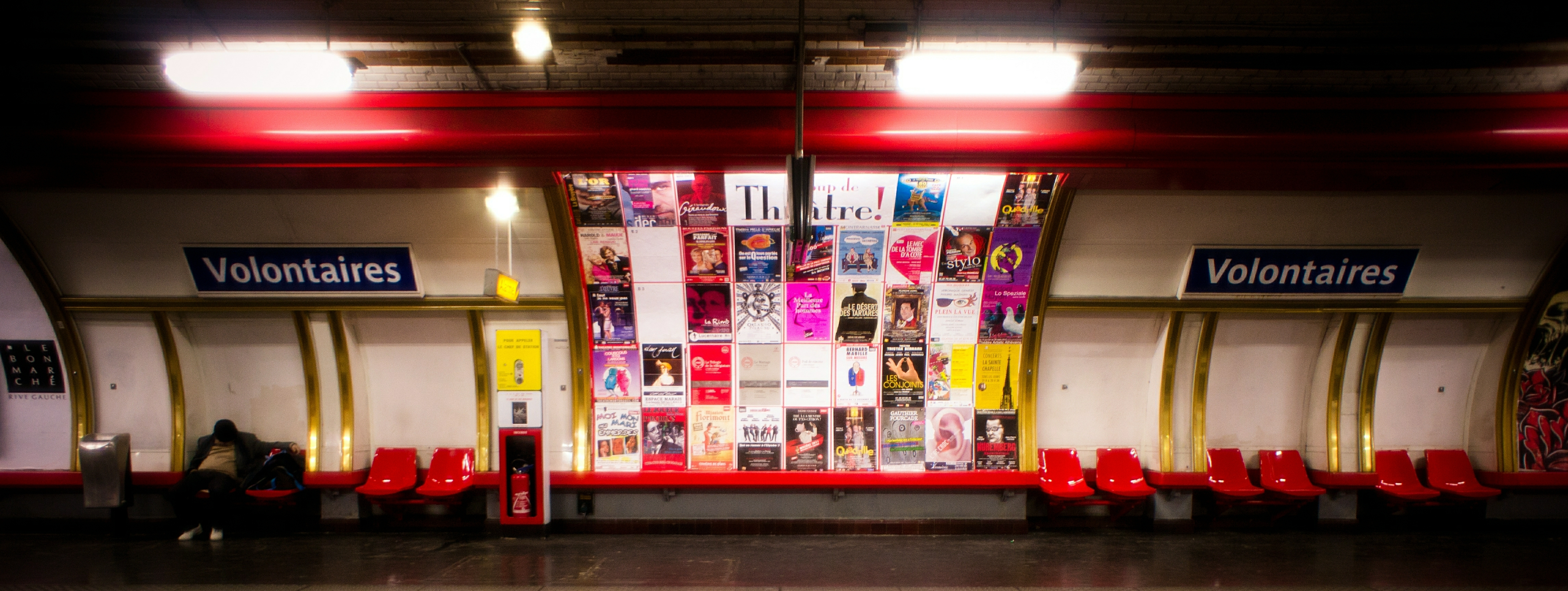
The station in 2012, prior to renovation

The station opened on 5 November 1910 as part of the original section of the Nord-Sud Company's line A between Porte de Versailles and Notre-Dame-de-Lorette. On 27 March 1931, line A became line 12 when It was taken over by the Compagnie du chemin de fer métropolitain de Paris (CMP), incorporating it into the Paris Métro.

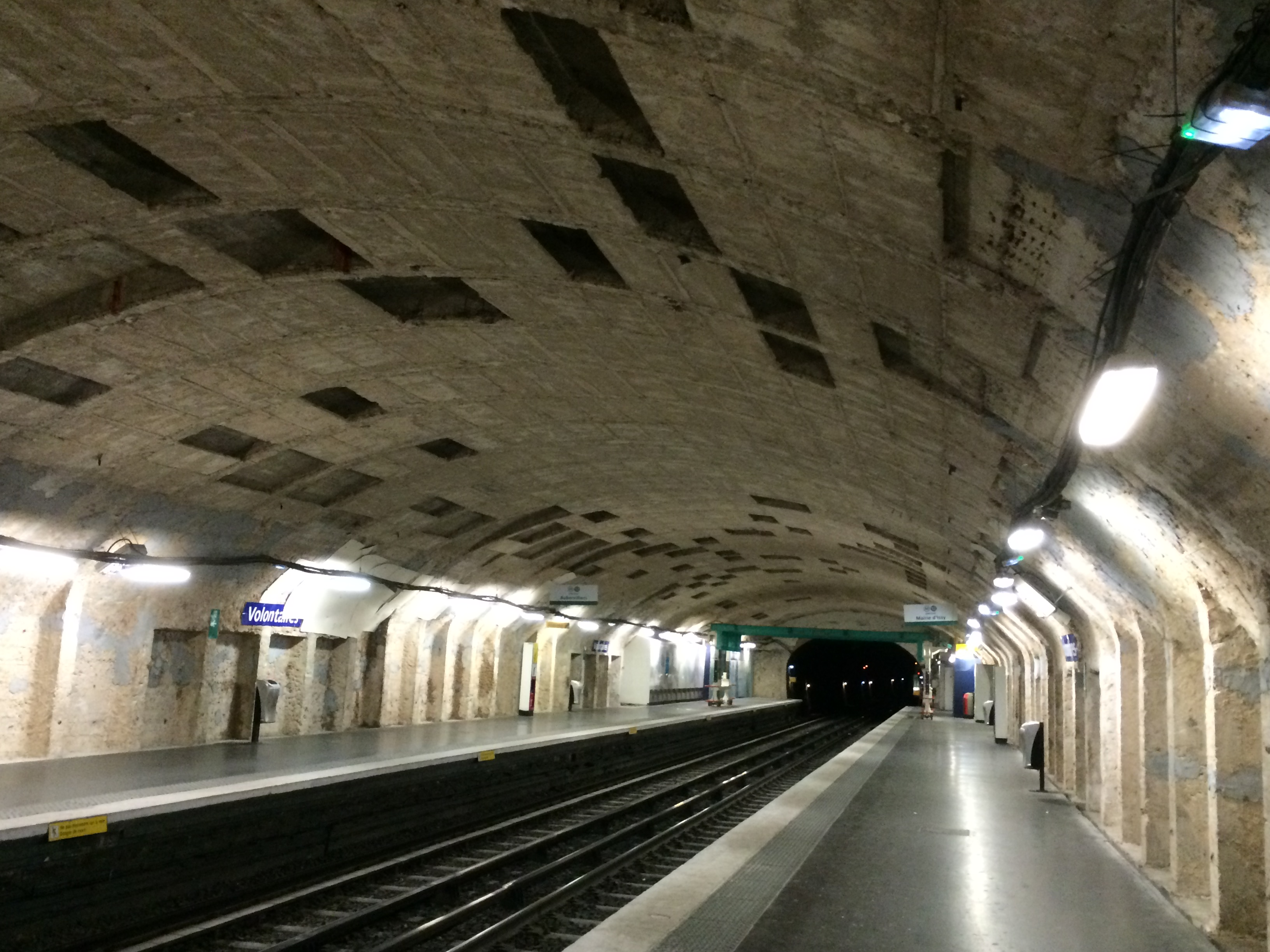
Works at the station in 2016

From the 1950s, like most stations along the line, the platforms were modernised with the installation of red metal casings and golden advertising frames on the walls until 2015, when it was removed as part of the "Un métro + beau" programme by the RATP. It consisted of modernising the platforms by improving lighting, signages, as well as returning the characteristic beveled white tiles of the Paris métro to the station, thereby restoring the platforms to its original "Nord-Sud" decoration, while the station remained open. The new tiles were installed by May 2018, with all work completed by March 2019 after several delays and technical difficulties.

In 2019, the station was used by 2,362,771 passengers, making it the 219th busiest of the Métro network out of 302 stations.

In 2020, the station was used by 1,111,705 passengers amidst the COVID-19 pandemic, making it the 232nd busiest of the Métro network out of 304 stations.

In 2021, the station was used by 1,734,848 passengers, making it the 203rd busiest of the Métro network out of 304 stations.

On 7 April 2022, the RATP and in partnership with the Blomet Paradiso association, unveiled a new cultural panel along the corridors of the station. It details the rich artistic history of the district, often attributable to the Bal Blomet, a historic cabaret of the Roaring Twenties in Montparnasse that Joséphine Baker, Simone de Beauvoir, and Ernest Hemingway frequented.

== Passenger services ==
=== Access ===
The station has a single access at rue de Vaugirard. Unusually, it consists of an entrance and an exit both located within the same building at the corner of rue de Vaugirard and rue des Volontaires, a rare occurrence on the network. The entrance is along rue de Vaugirard whereas the exit is along rue des Volontaires.

=== Station layout ===
Street Level
B1	Mezzanine
Platform level	Side platform, doors will open on the right
Platform level	Southbound	← toward Mairie d'Issy (Vaugirard)
Platform level	Northbound	toward Mairie d'Aubervilliers (Pasteur) →
Platform level	Side platform, doors will open on the right

=== Platforms ===
The station has a standard configuration with 2 tracks surrounded by 2 side platforms. The lower portion of the side walls are vertical instead of elliptical, as are the other stations constructed by the Nord-Sud company (today on lines 12 and 13). It is distinguished by the presence of niches along the entire length of the side walls, hence, are devoid of advertisements.

=== Other connections ===
The station is also served by lines 39, 70, and 89 of the RATP bus network, and at night, by lines N13 and N62 of the Noctilien bus network.

== Gallery ==
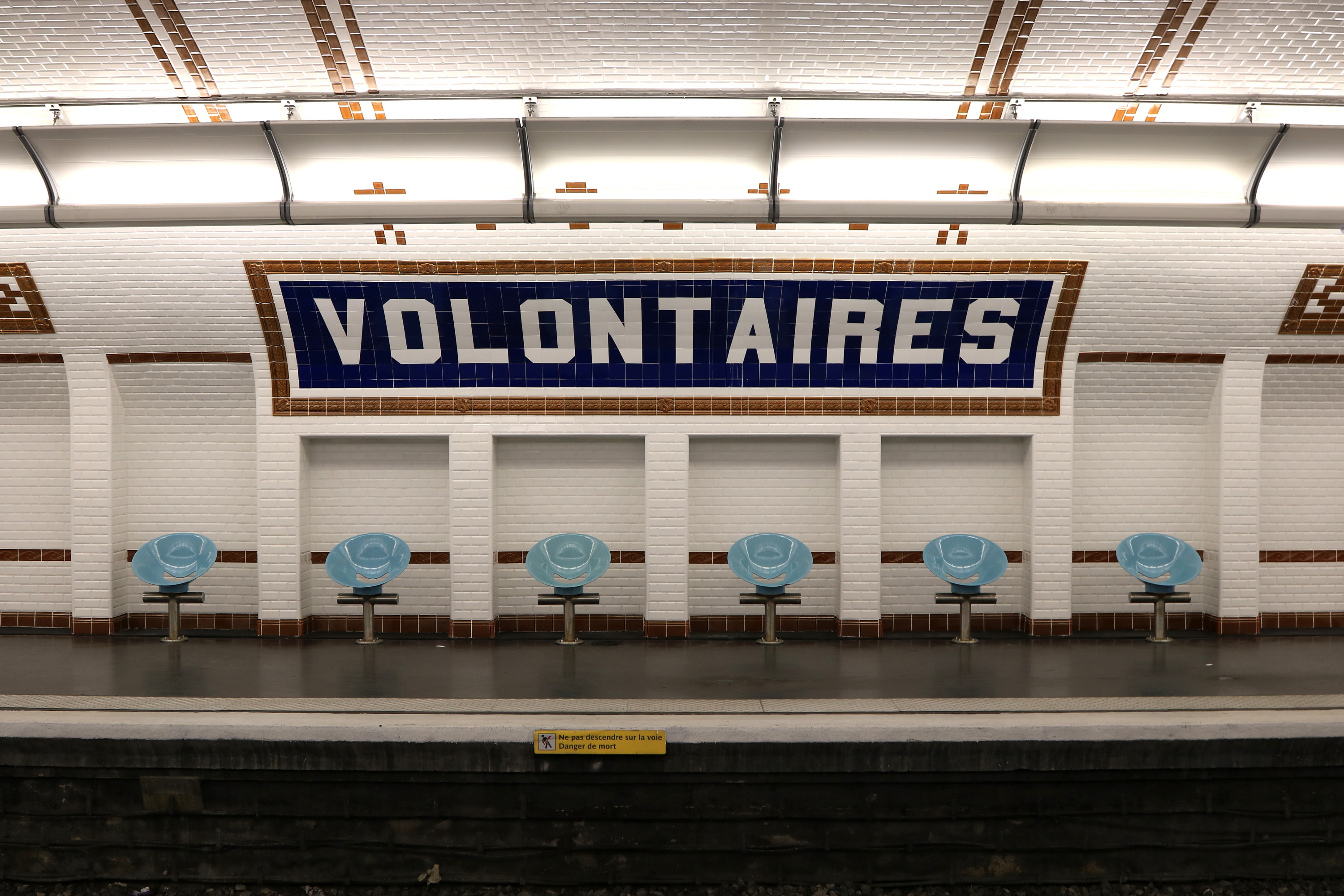
The station after the renovation

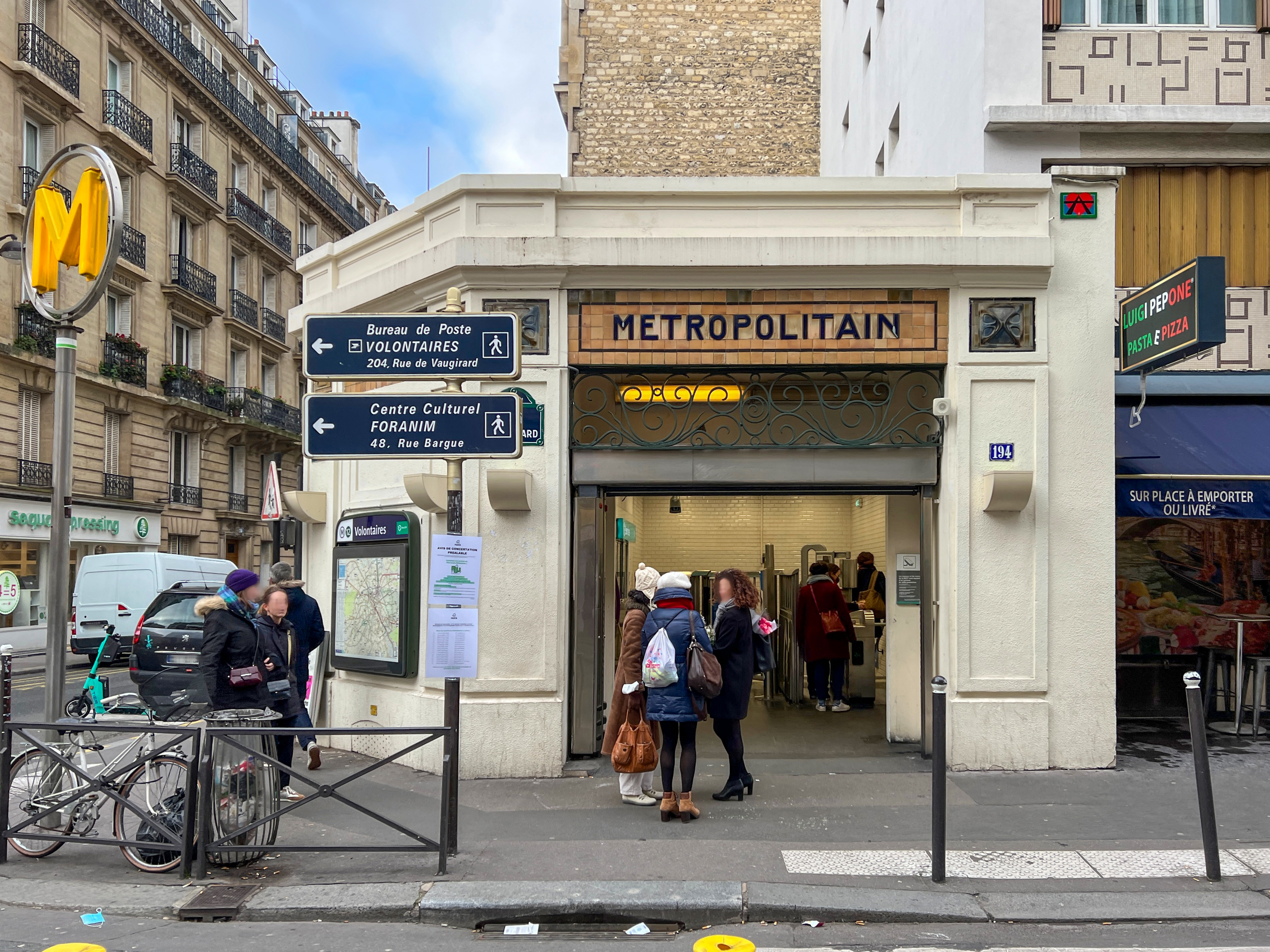
Entrance of the station. The exit is on the other side.

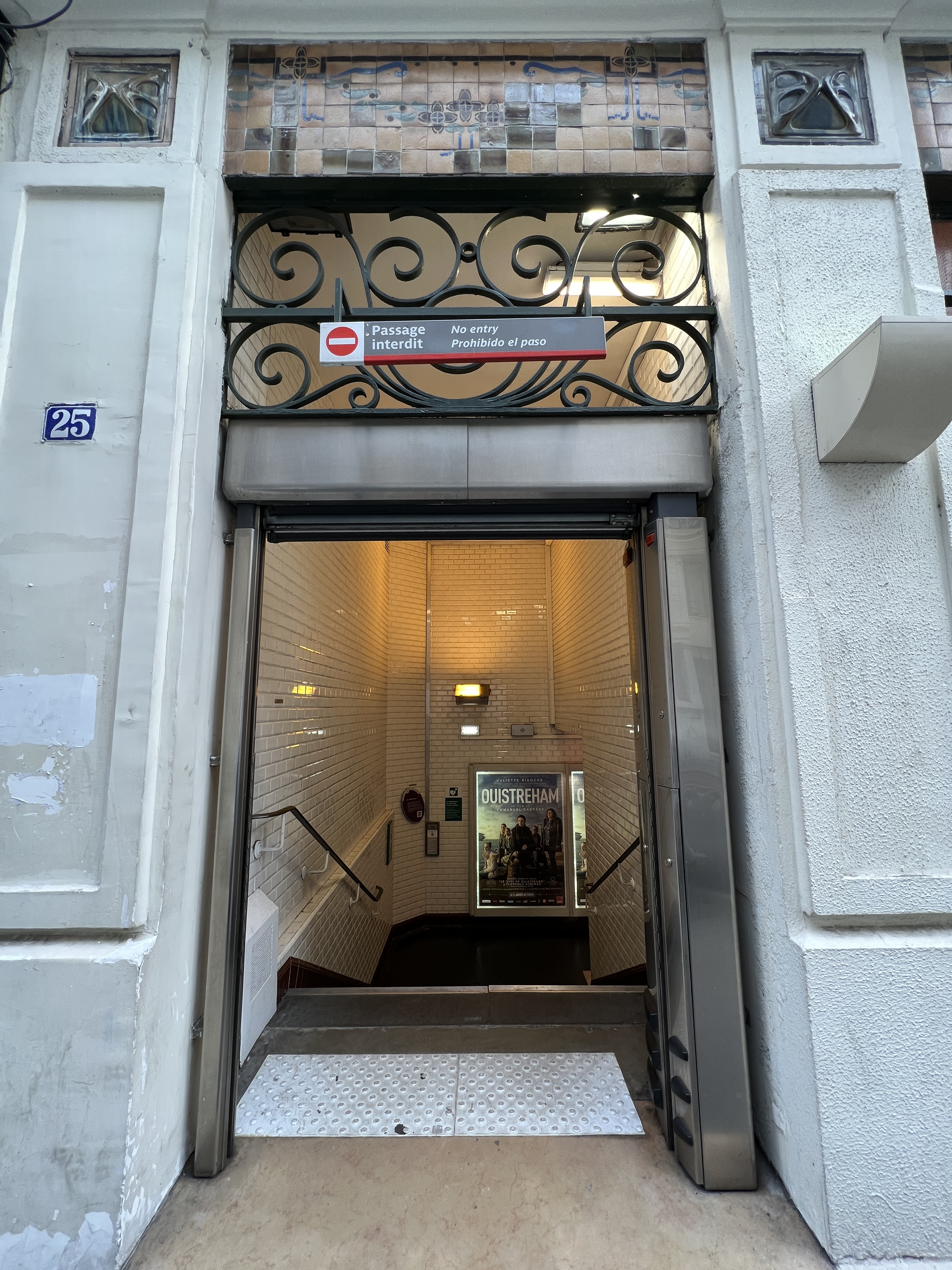
Exit
