= Saint-Placide station =

Metro station in Paris, France

Saint-Placide
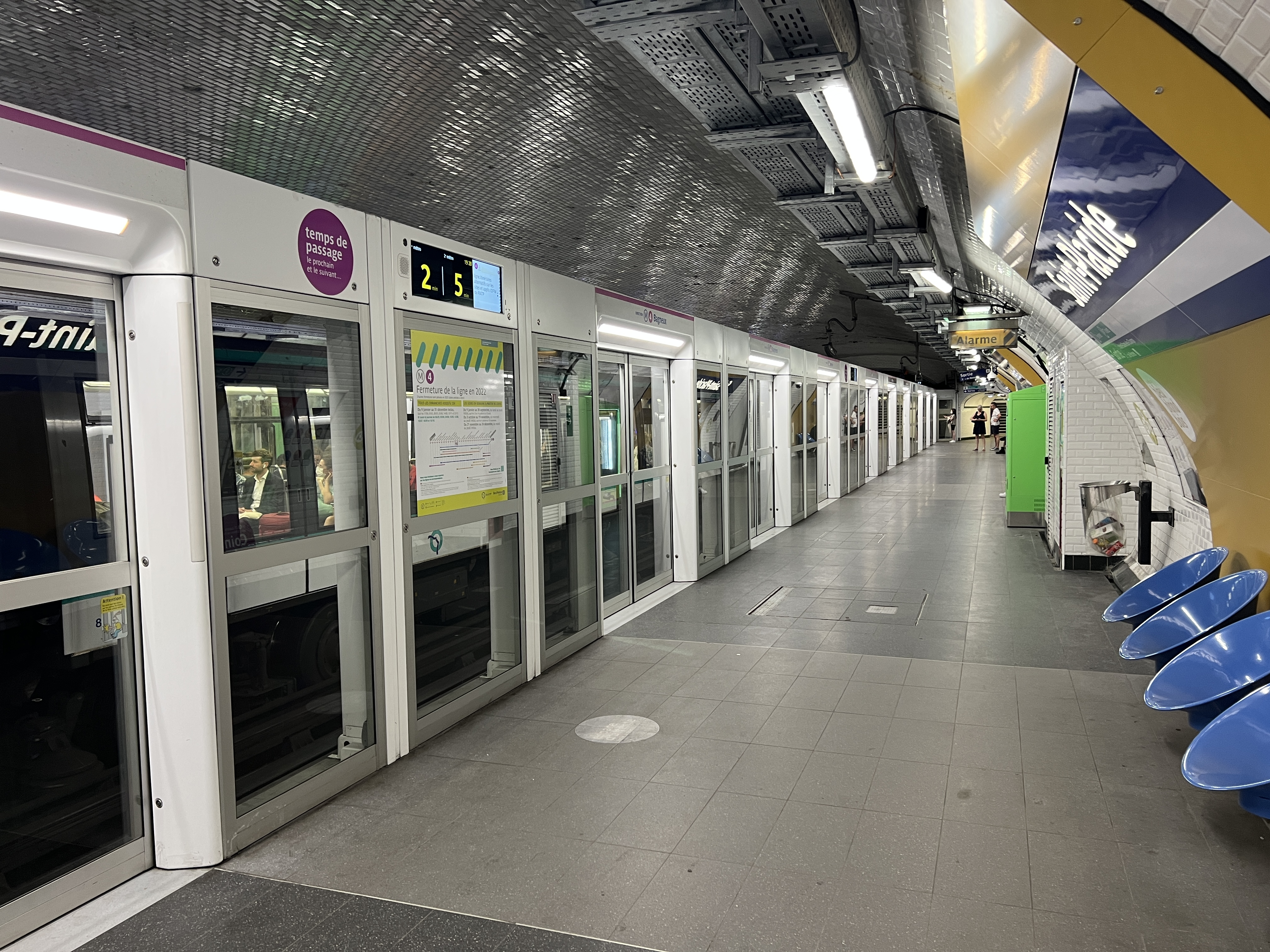
- Platforms

General information
- Location: 127, Rue de Rennes; 6th arrondissement of Paris; Île-de-France; France
- Coordinates: 48°50′48.64″N 2°19′36.89″E
- Owner: RATP
- Operator: RATP

Other information
- Fare zone: 1

History
- Opened: 9 January 1910
- Former names: Vaugirard (1910–1913)

Services
| Preceding station | Paris Metro | Following station |
|---|---|---|
| Montparnasse–Bienvenüe towards Bagneux–Lucie Aubrac | Line 4 | Saint-Sulpice towards Porte de Clignancourt |
Location
- Location within Paris

Saint-Placide (French pronunciation: [sɛ̃ plasid]) is a station on Line 4 of the Paris Métro. Situated in the 6th arrondissement, it was used by 3,376,988 passengers in 2018, making it the 163rd busiest Métro station out of 302.

== Location ==
The station is located under the Rue de Rennes at the intersection with the Rue de Vaugirard. Oriented approximately along a north–south axis, it is located between Saint-Sulpice and Montparnasse – Bienvenue, while being very close geographically to Rennes on Line 12.

== History ==
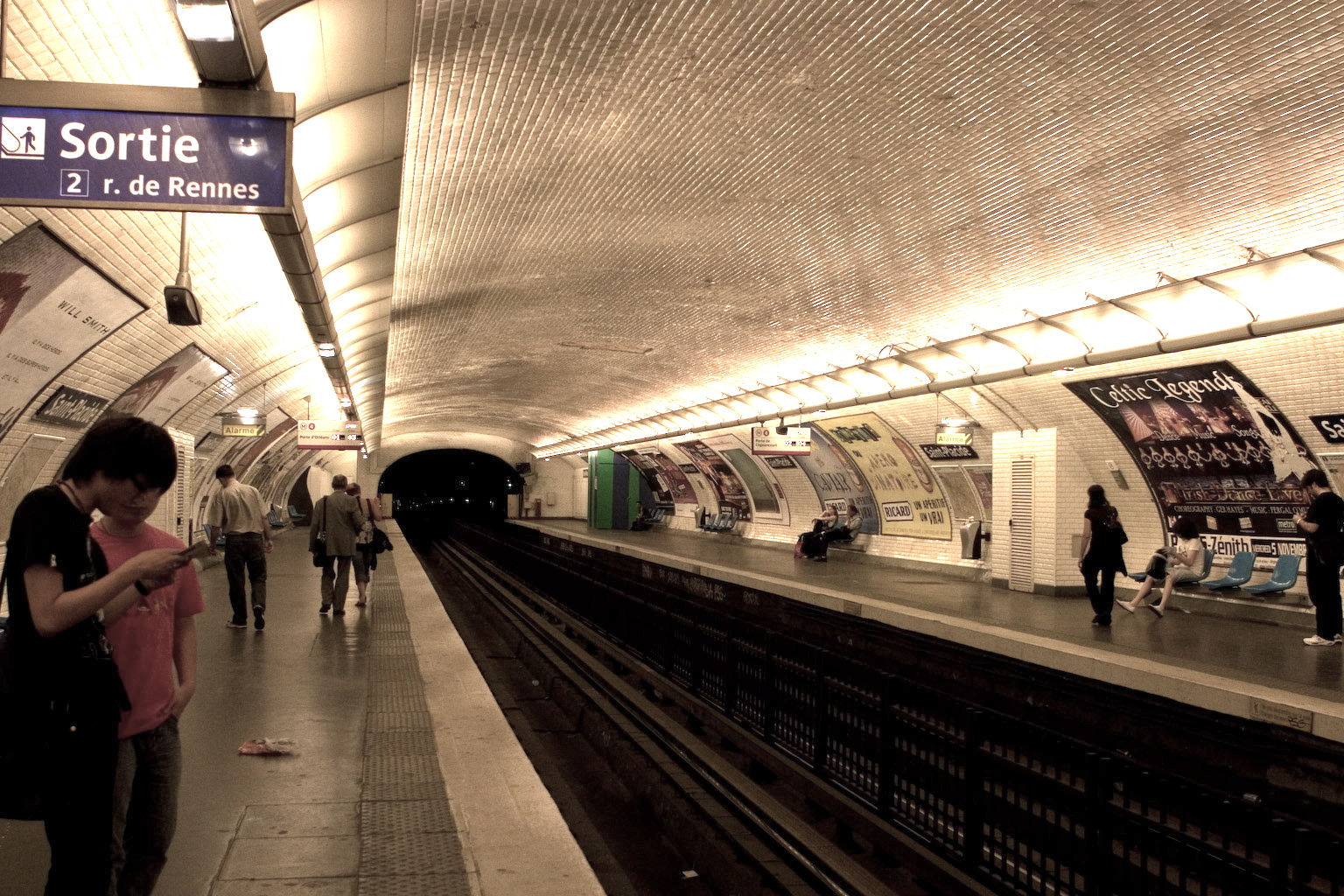
Platforms view

The station was opened on 9 January 1910 as part of the connecting section of the line under the Seine between Châtelet and Raspail. The station, in the Montparnasse area, is after Rue Saint-Placide, commemorating Saint Placidus. It was opened on 9 January 1910 under the name of Vaugirard, but its name was changed on 15 November 1913 to avoid confusion with the Nord-Sud Company's Vaugirard, now on Line 12.

Like most of the stations on Line 4, between October 1966 and October 1967, the platforms were extended to 90 metres in order to accommodate trains of six cars to cope with significant chronic overcrowding as well as the pneumatization of the said line. As part of the RATP Renouveau du métro program, the station corridors and platform lighting were renovated on 24 May 2005.

From 2017, the platforms were undergoing a partial modernisation as part of the automation of Line 4, including their elevation to accommodate platform screen doors, which were installed from August to September 2019.

== Passenger services ==
=== Access ===
The station has a main entrance as well as a secondary exit:

- Entrance 1: Rue Notre-Dame-des-Champs, consisting of a fixed staircase decorated with a Val d'Osne candelabra, located at the right of number 127 of the Rue de Rennes, at the corner with Rue Notre-Dame-des-Champs;
- Entrance 2: Rue de Rennes, consisting of an escalator allowing only an exit from the platform in the direction of Mairie de Montrouge, leading to front of number 120 of the Rue de Rennes.

=== Station layout ===
Street Level

| B1 | Mezzanine for platform connection |

| Line 4 platform level | Side platform, with PSDs doors will open on the right |
| Line 4 platform level | Northbound | ← toward Porte de Clignancourt (Saint-Sulpice) |
| Line 4 platform level | Southbound | toward Bagneux–Lucie Aubrac (Montparnasse – Bienvenüe) → |
| Line 4 platform level | Side platform, with PSDs, doors will open on the right |

=== Platforms ===
Saint-Placide is a standard configuration station. It has two platforms separated by the metro tracks and the arch is elliptical.

=== Bus connections ===
The station is served by lines 39, 89, 94, 95 and 96 of the RATP Bus Network as well as, at night, by lines N01, N02, N12 and N13 of the Noctilien network.

== Nearby ==
- Rue de Rennes: the station serves the southern part of this shopping street in the 6th arrondissement.
- Institut Catholique de Paris: the station is relatively close to the establishment, located at 21 Rue d'Assas.
