= Vaugirard station =

Metro station in Paris, France

Vaugirard Adolphe Chérioux
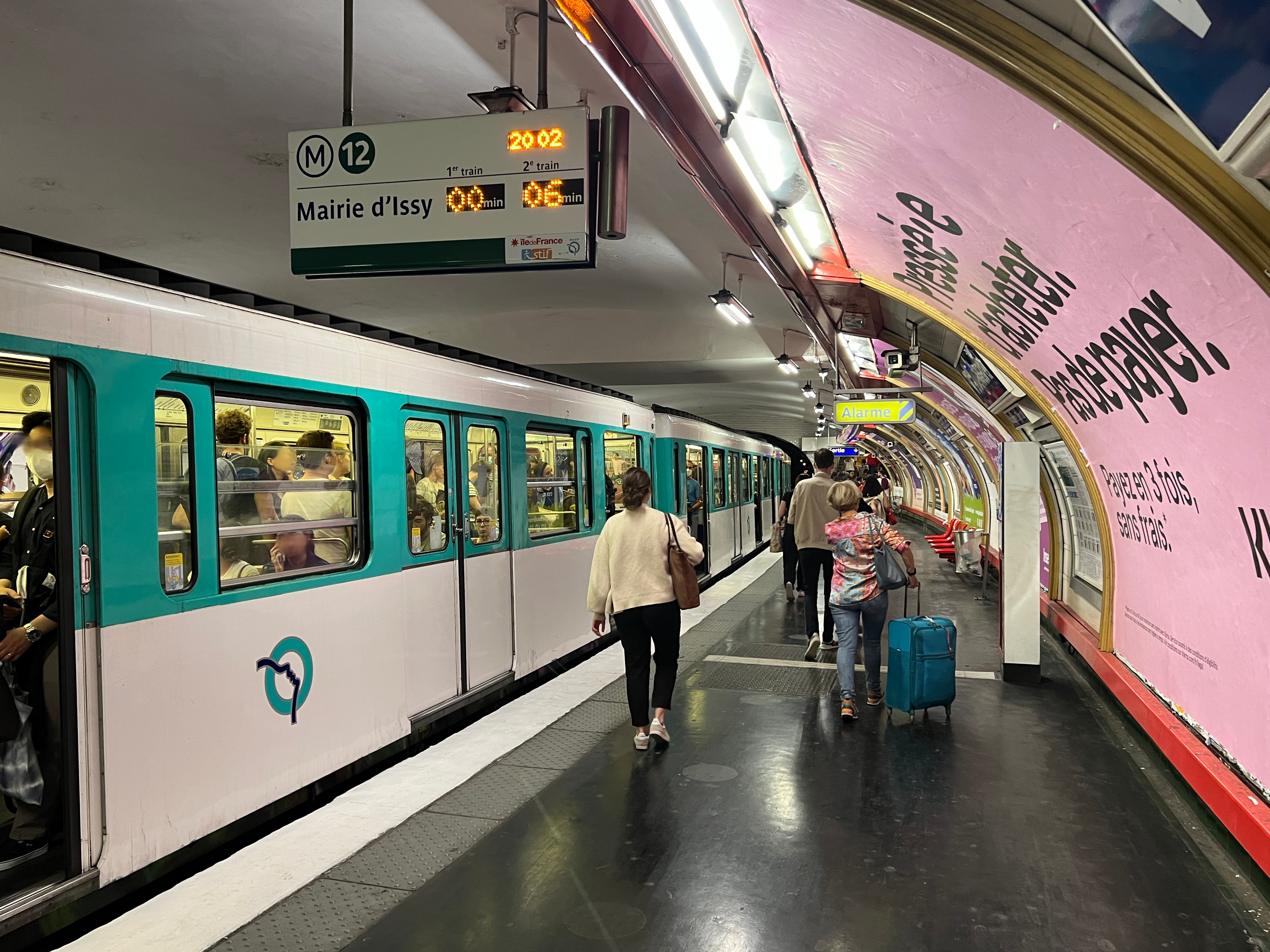
- MF 67 at Vaugirard

General information
- Location: 15th arrondissement of Paris; Île-de-France; France
- Coordinates: 48°50′23″N 2°18′05″E
- System: Paris Métro station
- Owner: RATP
- Operator: RATP
- Line: Paris Metro Paris Metro Line 12
- Platforms: 2 (side platforms)
- Tracks: 2

Construction
- Accessible: no

Other information
- Station code: 1604
- Fare zone: 1

History
- Opened: 5 November 1910

Passengers
- 2,482,886 (2021)

Services
Preceding station	Paris Metro	Following station
Convention towards Mairie d'Issy	Line 12	Volontaires towards Mairie d'Aubervilliers
Location
- Location within Paris

Vaugirard (French pronunciation: [voʒiʁaʁ]) is a station on Line 12 of the Paris Métro in the 15th arrondissement.

It is named after the nearby Rue de Vaugirard, which in turn was named after the former Place de Vaugirard, renamed to Place Adolphe Chérioux in 1935. The station's name is subtitled Adolphe Chérioux (1857–1934), a former mayor of the district. This street also lent its name to Vaugirard on Line 4, which was renamed Saint-Placide on 15 November 1913 to prevent confusion.

The station is unusual in that it contains two shops (a newsagent and clothes store) even though it is not an interchange station.

== History ==
The station opened on 5 November 1910 as part of the original section of the Nord-Sud Company's line A between Porte de Versailles and Notre-Dame-de-Lorette. On 27 March 1931, line A became line 12 when It was taken over by the Compagnie du chemin de fer métropolitain de Paris (CMP), incorporating it into the Paris Métro.

Like most stations along the line, the platforms were modernised with the installation of green metal casings on the walls from the 1950s, subsequently repainted in red.

In 2019, the station was used by 3,445,009 passengers, making it the 141st busiest of the Métro network out of 302 stations.

In 2020, the station was used by 1,709,593 passengers amidst the COVID-19 pandemic, making it the 145th busiest of the Métro network out of 304 stations.

In 2021, the station was used by 2,482,886 passengers, making it the 136th busiest of the Métro network out of 304 stations.

== Passenger services ==
=== Access ===
The station has 3 accesses:

- Access 1: Place Adolphe Chérioux (with an ascending escalator)
- Access 2: rue d'Alleray
- Access 3: rue des Favorites

=== Station layout ===
Street Level
B1	Mezzanine
Platform level	Side platform, doors will open on the right
Platform level	Southbound	← toward Mairie d'Issy (Convention)
Platform level	Northbound	toward Mairie d'Aubervilliers (Volontaires) →
Platform level	Side platform, doors will open on the right

=== Platforms ===
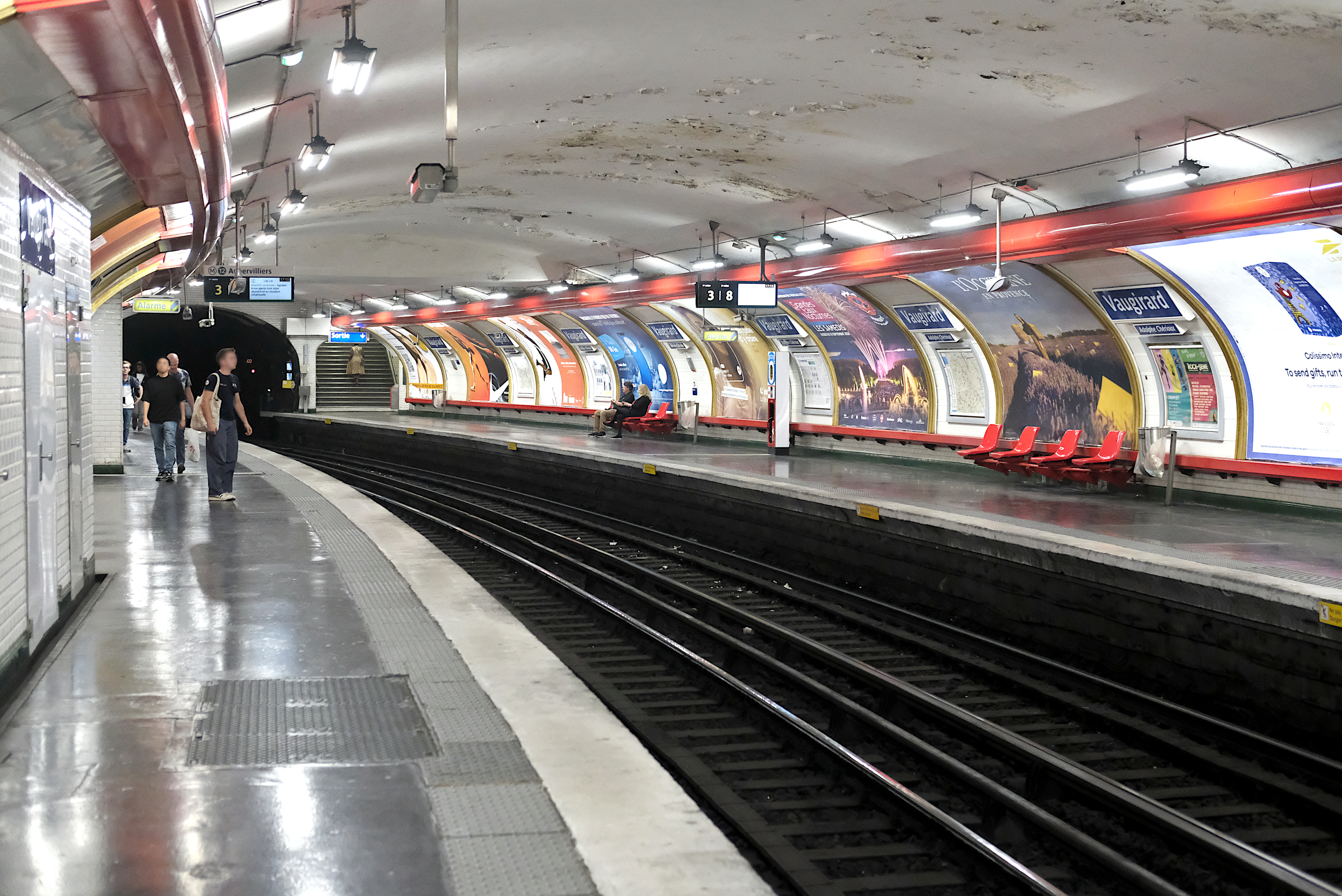
Northbound : toward Mairie d'Aubervilliers.

The station has a standard configuration with 2 tracks surrounded by 2 side platforms. The lower portion of the side walls are vertical instead of elliptical, as are the other stations constructed by the Nord-Sud company (today on lines 12 and 13).

Unlike many other stations on the line, its characteristic Nord-Sud tiling has disappeared: its vault simply painted white and the side walls covered with a metal casing.

=== Other connections ===
The station is also served by lines 39, 70, 80, and 88 of the RATP bus network, as well as the Traverse Brancion-Commerce, an electric bus operated by BE Green from parc Georges Brassens to the Pasteur Institute. At night, it is served by lines N13 and N62 of the Noctilien bus network.

== Gallery ==
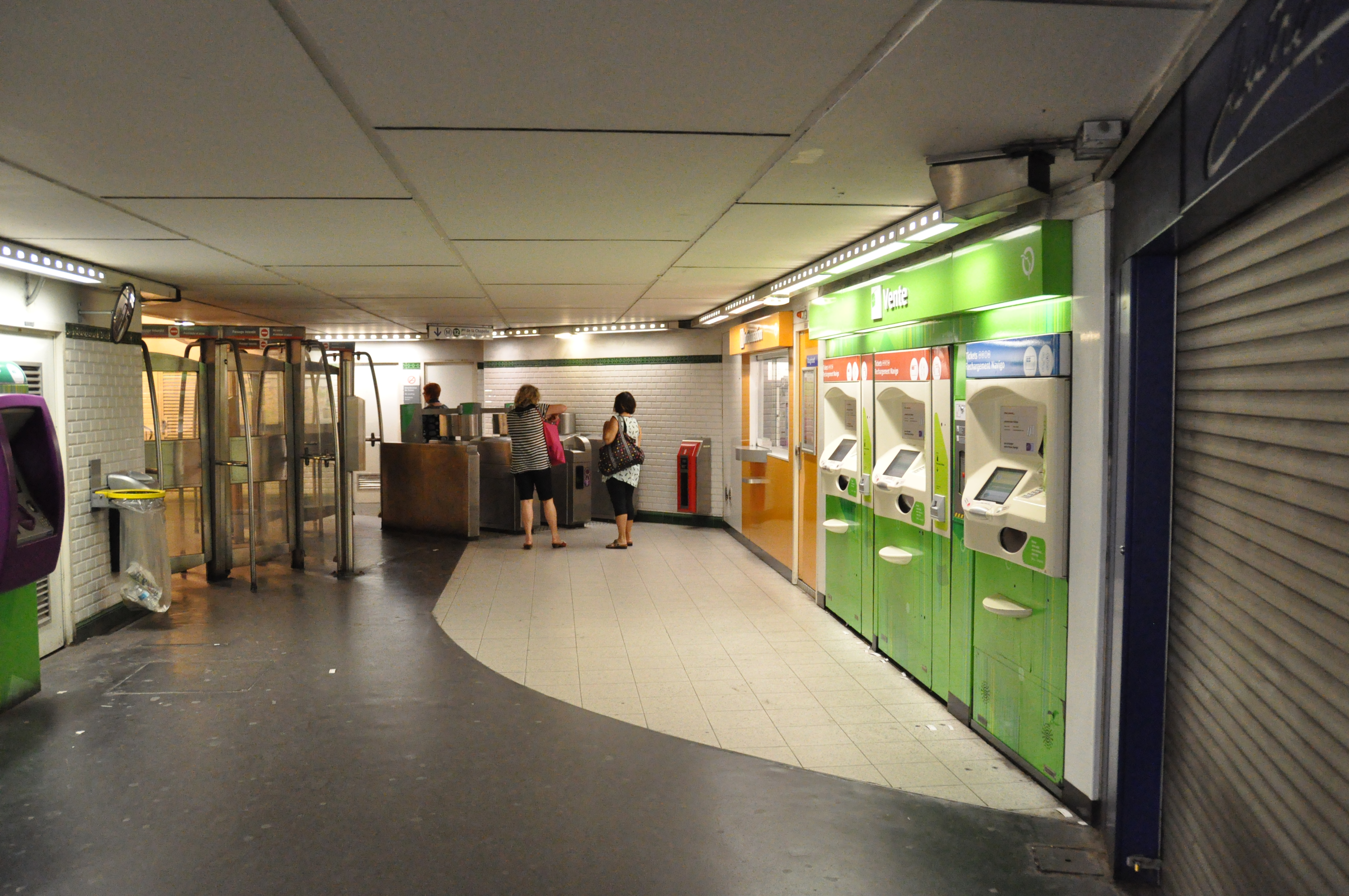
Ticket barriers and shops at the mezzanine

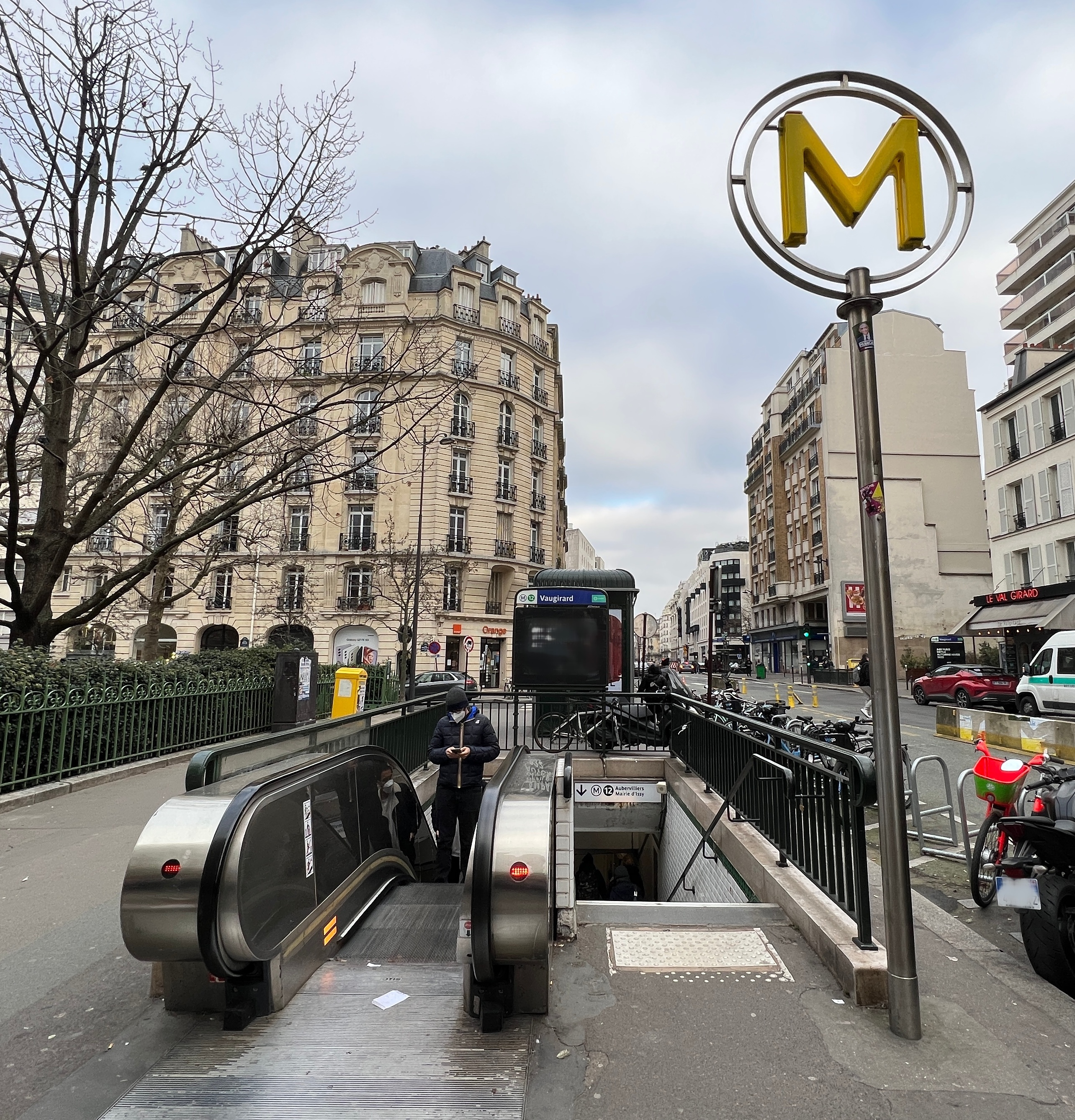
Access 1

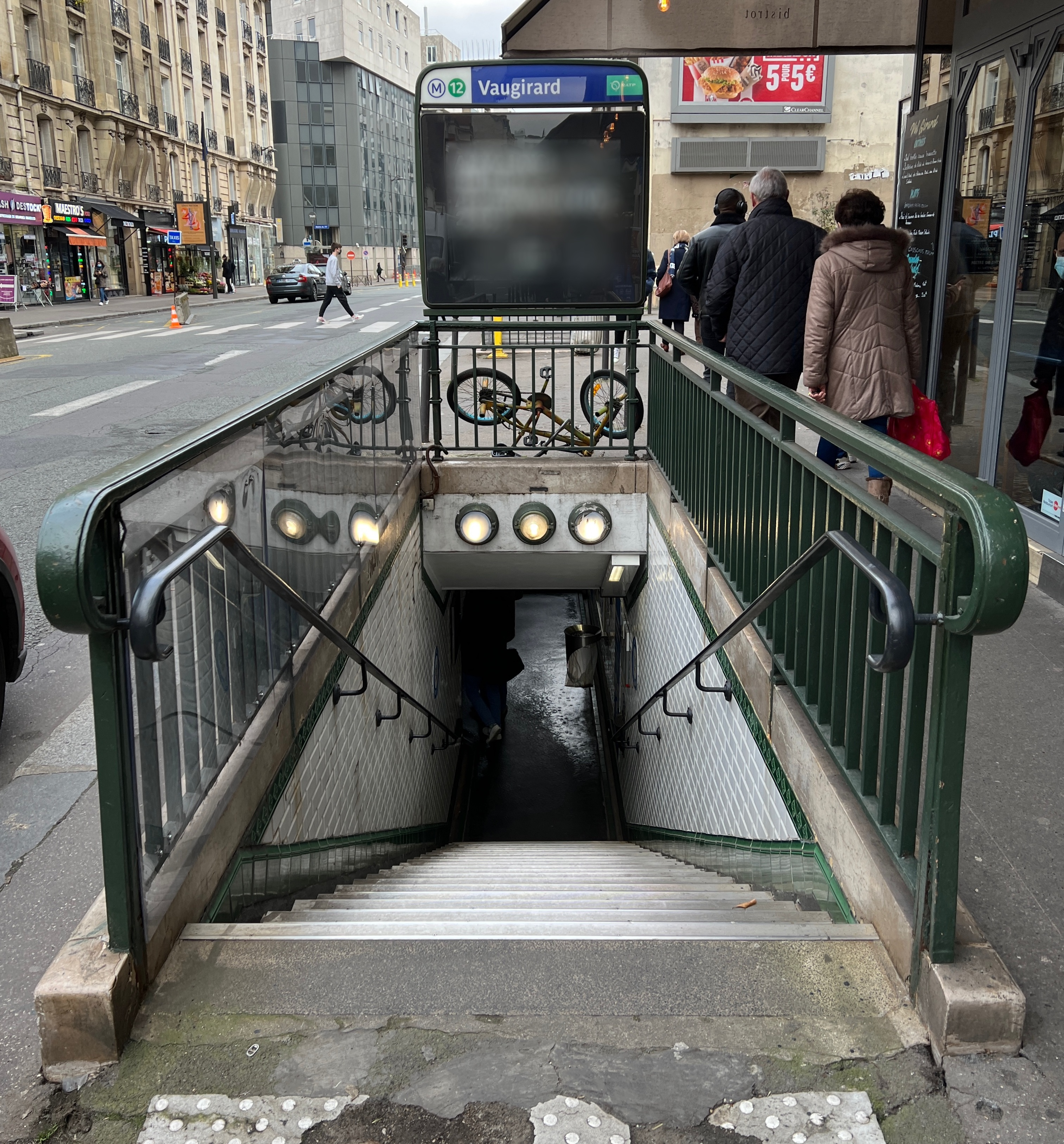
Access 2

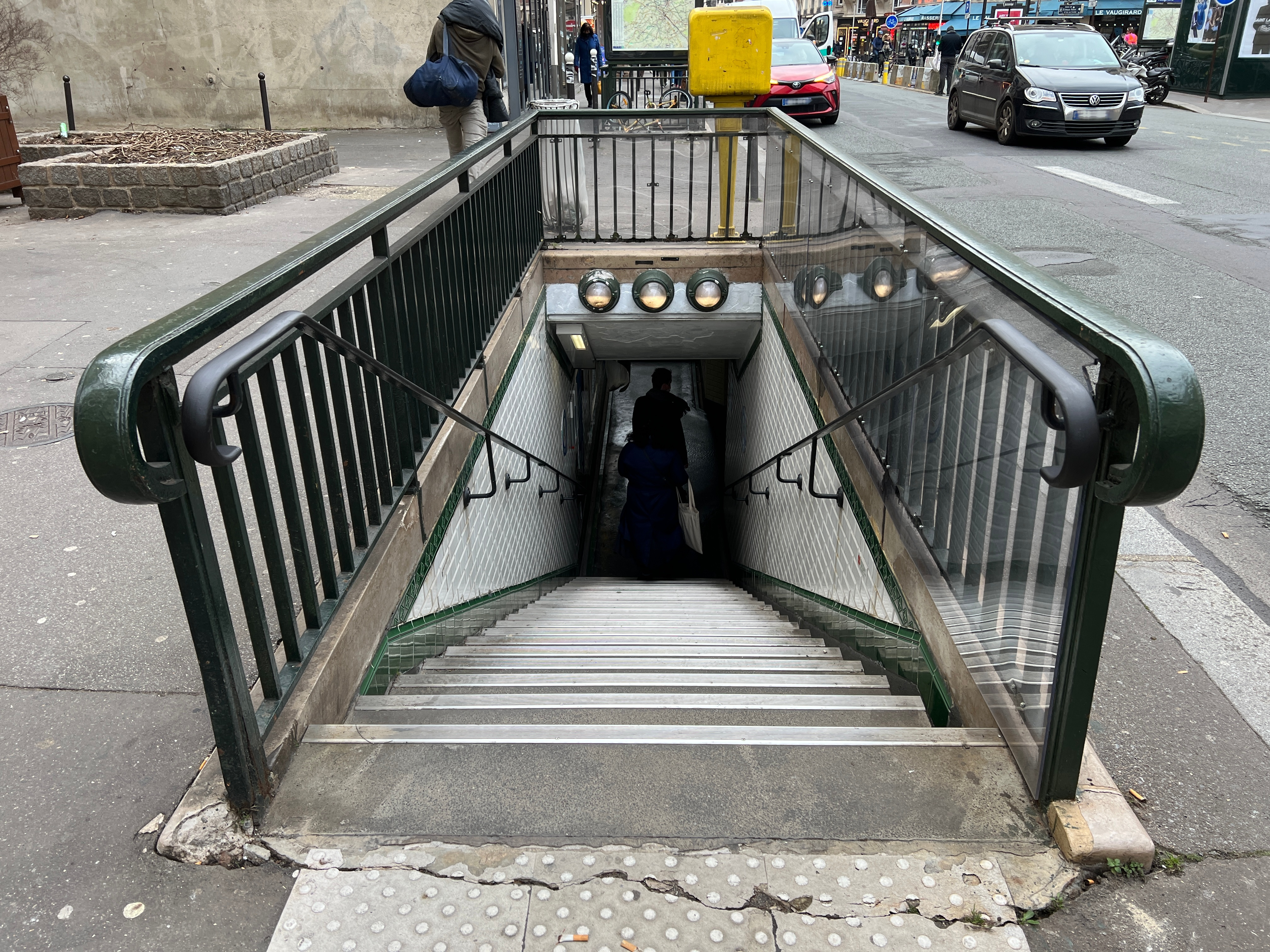
Access 3

== Nearby ==
- Église Saint-Lambert de Vaugirard
- Maison et atelier du maître-verrier Barillet (built by French architect Robert Mallet-Stevens for French glassmaker Louis Barillet)
- Square Adolphe-et-Jean-Chérioux
- Square Saint-Lambert
- Town hall of the 15th arrondissement
