= Saint-Sulpice station (Paris Metro) =

Metro station in Paris, France

Saint-Sulpice
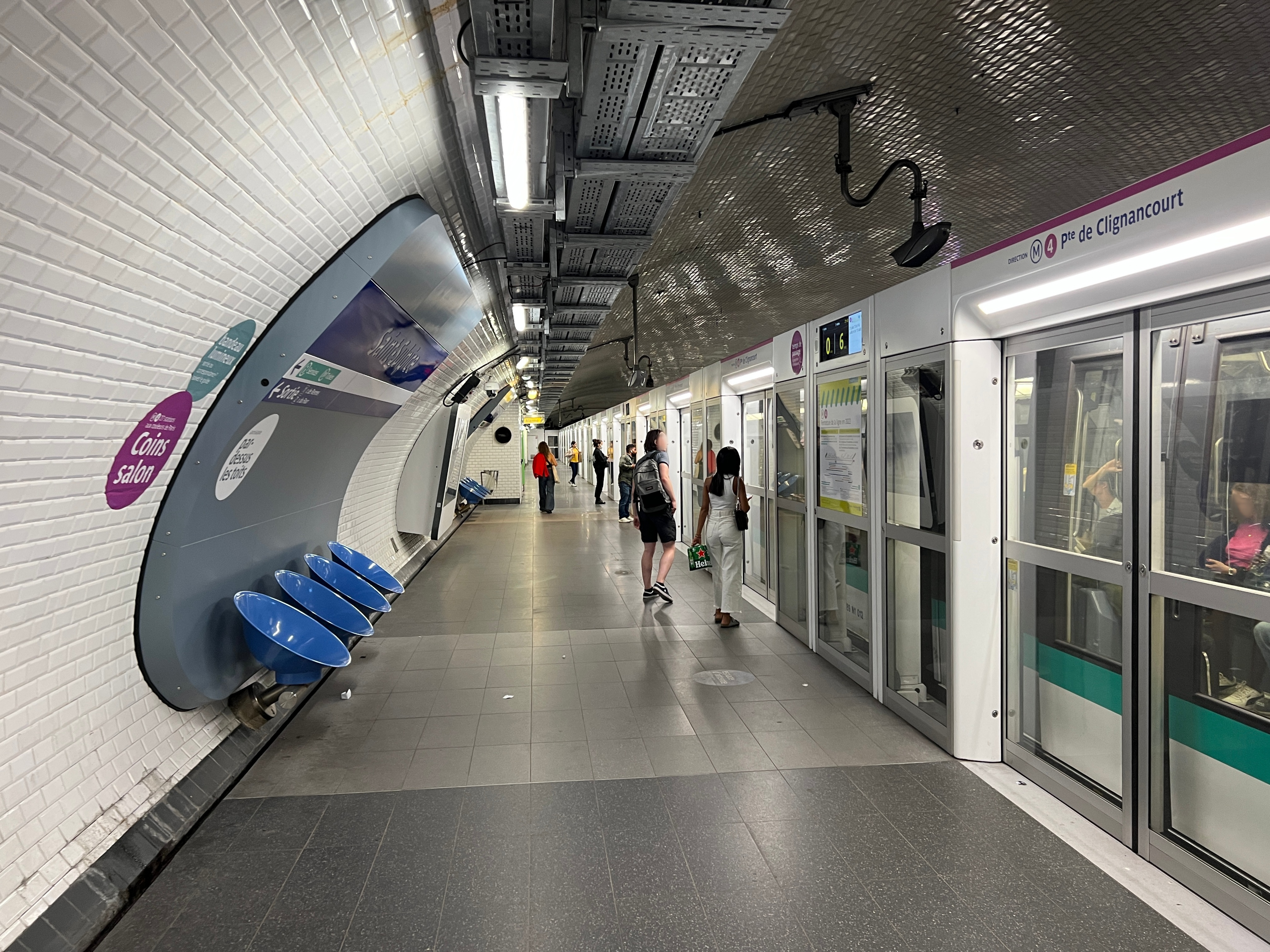
- Platforms at Saint-Sulpice in July 2022

General information
- Location: 65, Rue de Rennes; 69, Rue de Rennes; 6th arrondissement of Paris; Île-de-France; France
- Coordinates: 48°51′03″N 2°19′50″E
- Owner: RATP
- Operator: RATP

Other information
- Fare zone: 1

History
- Opened: 9 January 1910

Services
Preceding station	Paris Metro	Following station
Saint-Placide towards Bagneux–Lucie Aubrac	Line 4	Saint-Germain-des-Prés towards Porte de Clignancourt
Location
- Location within Paris

Saint-Sulpice (French pronunciation: [sɛ̃ sylpis]) is a station on Line 4 of the Paris Métro. It is located on the Rive Gauche, in the 6th arrondissement. In 2018, 2,350,813 travelers entered this station which places it at the 234th position of Métro stations for its traffic.

== Location ==
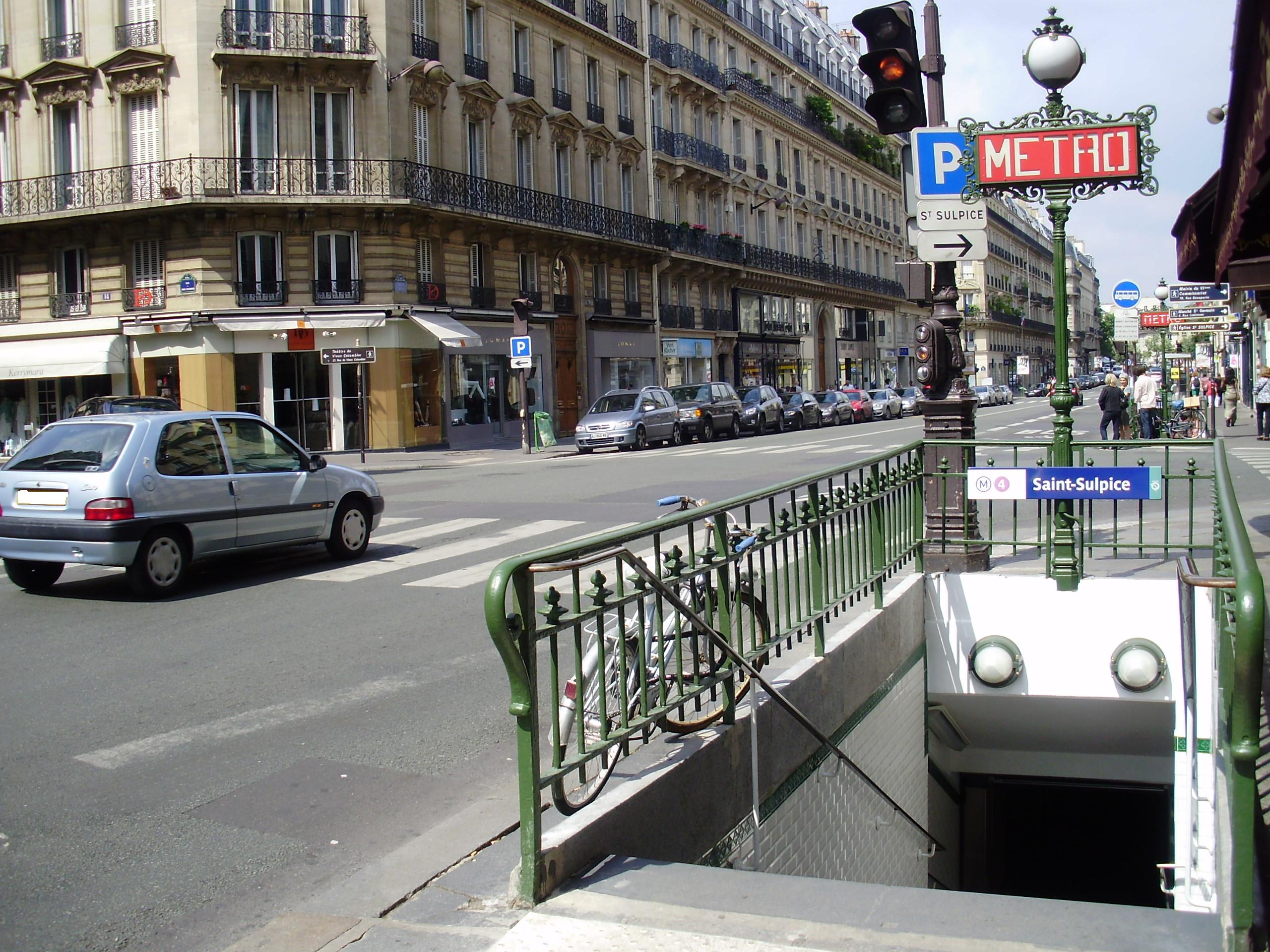
Station entrance

The station is located under the Rue de Rennes at the intersection with the Rue du Vieux-Colombier.

== History ==
The station was opened on 9 January 1910 as part of the connecting section of the line under the Seine between Châtelet and Raspail. It is named after the nearby Church of Saint-Sulpice, famous for its gnomon.

In the spring of 2010, the station underwent renovations as part of the Un métro + beau operation. From June to July 2019, platform doors were installed on the platforms as part of the line's ongoing full automation.

== Passenger services ==
=== Access ===
The station has three entrances:

- Entrance 1: Rue de Rennes, Rue du Four side in front of 65 Rue de Rennes
- Entrance 2: in front of 69 Rue de Rennes
- Entrance 3: rue de Rennes, rue de Mézières (escalator)

The two entrances located on the Rue de Rennes on either side of the Rue du Vieux-Colombier are decorated with a Val d'Osne candelabra.

=== Station layout ===
Street Level

B1	Mezzanine for platform connection

Line 4 platform level	Side platform, with PSDs doors will open on the right
Line 4 platform level	Northbound	← toward Porte de Clignancourt (Saint-Germain-des-Prés)
Line 4 platform level	Southbound	toward Bagneux–Lucie Aubrac (Saint-Placide) →
Line 4 platform level	Side platform, with PSDs doors will open on the right

=== Bus connections ===
- RATP buses 39, 63, 70, 84, 87, 95, 96
- Night buses N01, N02, N12, N13

== Nearby ==
Also nearby are the Church of Saint-Sulpice of Paris, Luxembourg Palace, the Saint-Germain-des-Prés neighbourhood, Rue Bonaparte, Institute of Intercultural Management and Communication and the mairie of the 6th arrondissement.

== Gallery ==
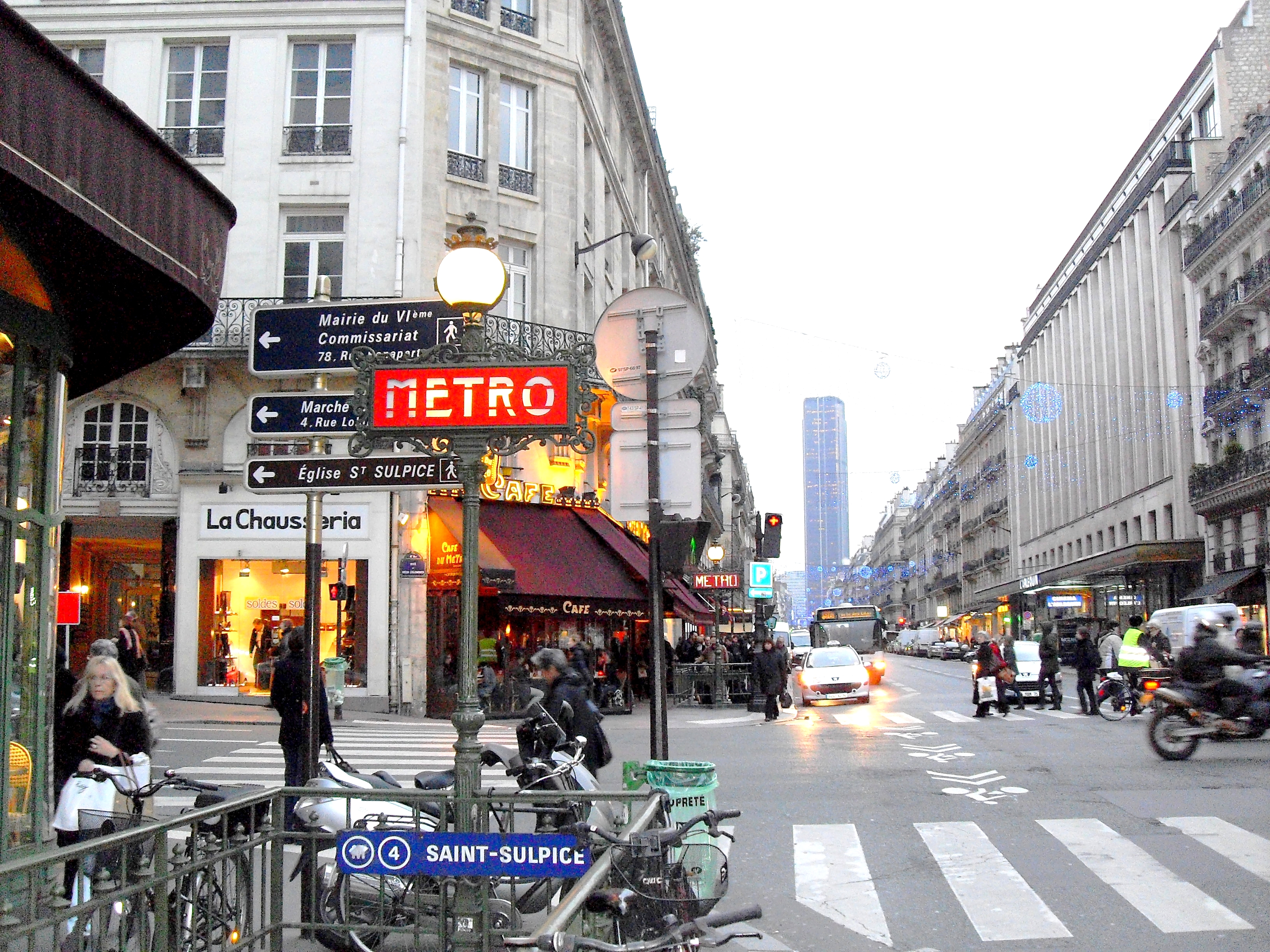
Street-level entrance at Saint-Sulpice

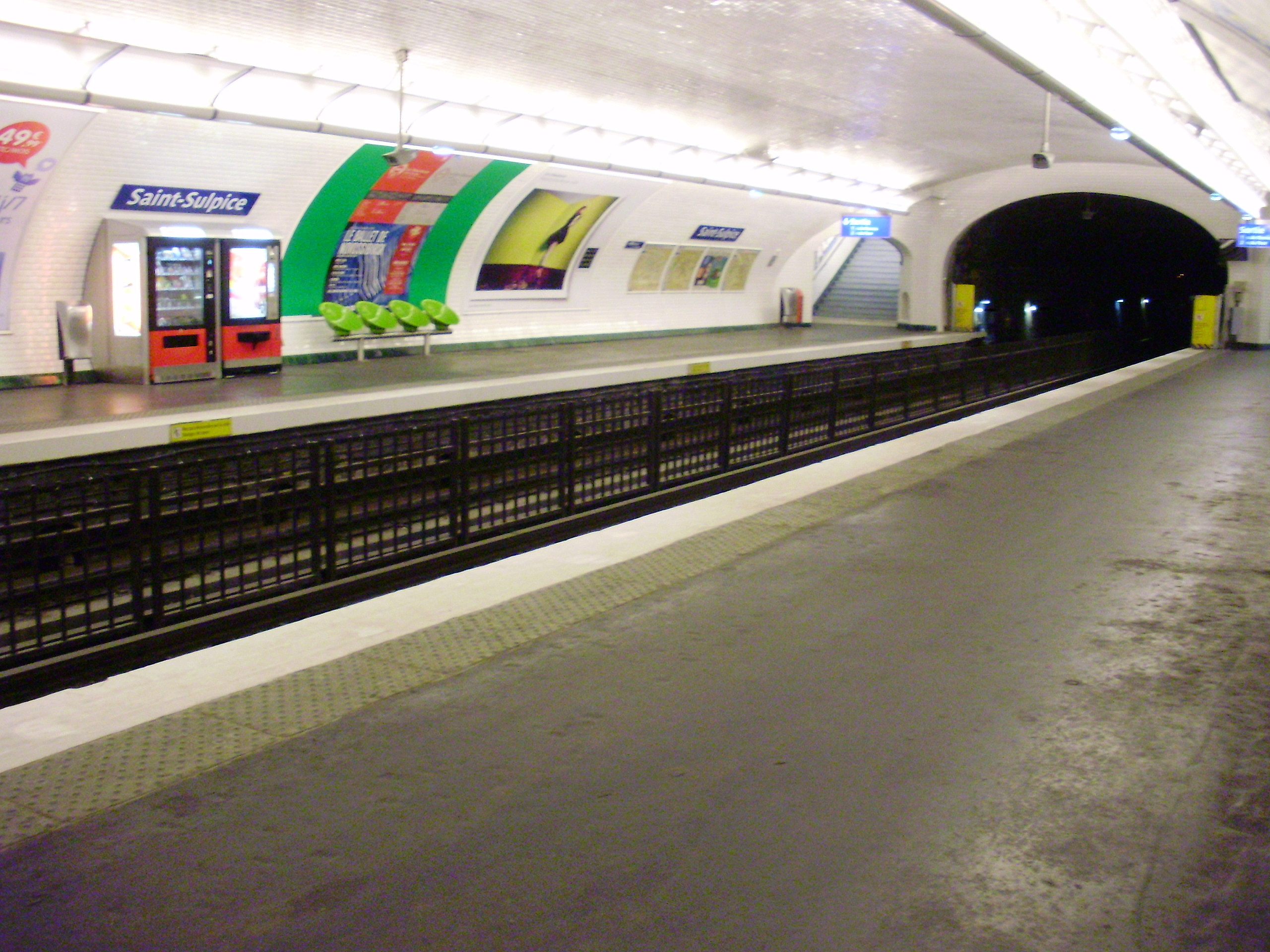
Platforms at Saint-Sulpice with a view towards Porte de Clignancourt
