= Châtelet–Les Halles station =

Major railway station in Paris

Châtelet–Les Halles
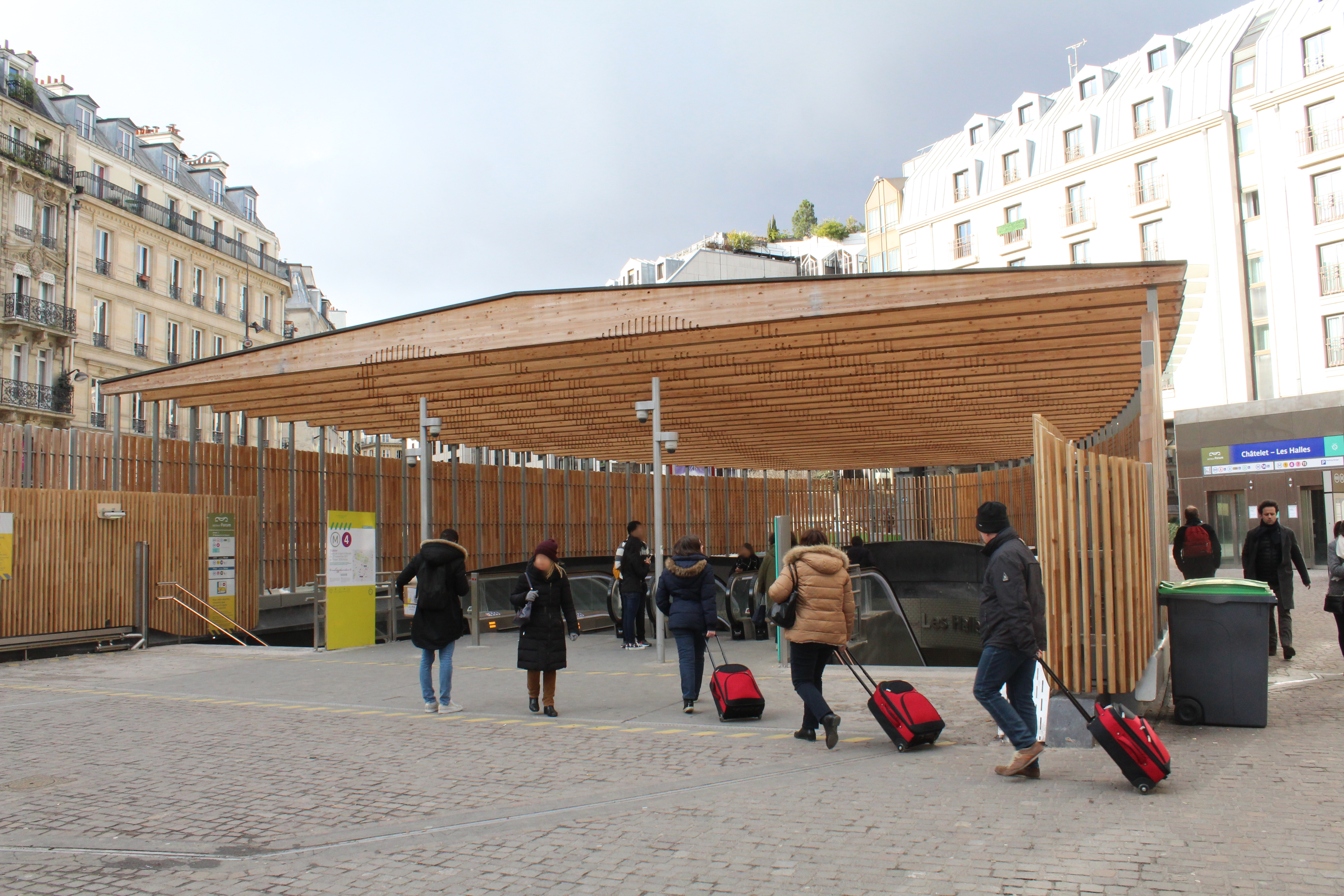
- Place Marguerite de Navarre entrance

General information
- Location: 1st arrondissement of Paris; France
- Coordinates: 48°51′41″N 2°20′47″E
- Operator: RATP Group
- Platforms: 4 island platforms
- Tracks: 7
- Connections: Paris Metro Paris Metro Line 1 Paris Metro Line 4 Paris Metro Line 7 Paris Metro Line 11 Paris Metro Line 14 Bus

Construction
- Structure type: Underground
- Accessible: RER A & B: Yes, by request to staff; RER D: No

Other information
- Station code: 87758607
- Fare zone: 1

History
- Opened: 9 December 1977

Passengers
- 2019: 33,581,162 (RER A & B, direct entries only (Note: In particular, does not count transfers – except possibly from the SNCF-operated RER D?))

Services
| Preceding station | RER | Following station |
|---|---|---|
| Auber towards Saint-Germain-en-Laye, Cergy-le-Haut or Poissy | RER A | Gare de Lyon towards Boissy-Saint-Léger or Marne-la-Vallée–Chessy |
| Gare du Nord towards Aéroport Charles de Gaulle 2 TGV or Mitry–Claye | RER B | Saint-Michel–Notre-Dame towards Robinson or Saint-Rémy-lès-Chevreuse |
| Gare du Nord towards Creil | RER D | Gare de Lyon towards Melun or Malesherbes |
Connections to other stations
| Preceding station | Paris Metro | Following station |
| Louvre–Rivoli towards La Défense | Line 1 transfer at Châtelet | Hôtel de Ville towards Château de Vincennes |
| Cité towards Bagneux–Lucie Aubrac | Line 4 transfer at Châtelet | Les Halles towards Porte de Clignancourt |
| Châtelet towards Bagneux–Lucie Aubrac | Line 4 transfer at Les Halles | Étienne Marcel towards Porte de Clignancourt |
| Pont Marie towards Villejuif–Louis Aragon or Mairie d'Ivry | Line 7 transfer at Châtelet | Pont Neuf towards La Courneuve–8 mai 1945 |
| Terminus | Line 11 transfer at Châtelet | Hôtel de Ville towards Rosny–Bois-Perrier |
| Pyramides towards Saint-Denis–Pleyel | Line 14 transfer at Châtelet | Gare de Lyon towards Aéroport d'Orly |
Location

Châtelet–Les Halles station (French: [ʃɑtlɛ le al]) is a major train hub in Paris and the largest underground station in the world. Opened in 1977, it is the central transit hub for the Paris metropolitan area, connecting three of five RER commuter-rail lines and five of sixteen Métro lines. The hub hosts 750,000 travellers per weekday (493,000 for the RER alone) and platforms separated by up to 800 metres (0.5 mi). It is named after the nearby Place du Châtelet public square and Les Halles, the former wholesale food market of Paris, now a shopping mall.

== Terminology ==
Station layout showing both RER and Métro lines

Formally, the name Châtelet–Les Halles designates the RER station alone. Informally, it refers to the hub comprising the eponymous RER station (served by RER A, RER B and RER D) plus the contiguous Paris Métro stations Châtelet (served by Line 1, Line 4, Line 7, Line 11 and Line 14) and Les Halles (served by Line 4).

For purposes of wayfinding, the massive three station complex is broken up into three sectors: Forum, Rivoli and Seine.

=== Forum sector ===
The Forum sector is named after the adjoining Forum des Halles shopping mall, which is accessible from this part of the station. The sector includes the RER platforms and the Les Halles station on Paris Métro Line 4. The exits located in the sector are numbered 1 through 9.

=== Rivoli sector ===
The Rivoli sector is below and named after the Rue de Rivoli, a major road known for its shopping and includes the Châtelet station of Line 1, Line 4 and Line 14 of the Paris Métro. The exits located in the sector are numbered 10 through 14.

=== Seine sector ===
The Seine sector is named after the nearby Seine River and includes the Châtelet station of Line 7 and Line 11 of the Paris Métro. The exits located in the sector are numbered 15 through 19.

== RER station layout ==
The tracks of all three RER lines are oriented parallel along an east–west direction. The seven tracks are grouped on four platforms, with the outer platforms reserved for RER A and RER B and the central ones for RER D. This enables easy cross-platform connections between RER A and RER B trains traveling in the same direction, and a solution for those RER D trains which use the station as a terminus.

| G | Street Level | Entrance/Exit |
| B1 | Mezzanine | to Entrances/Exits, connections to Châtelet and Les Halles |
| Platforms (B2) | Track 1A | toward Boissy-Saint-Léger or Marne-la-Vallée–Chessy (Gare de Lyon) → |
| Platforms (B2) | Island platform, doors will open on the left, right |
| Platforms (B2) | Track 1B | toward Robinson or Saint-Rémy-lès-Chevreuse (Saint-Michel–Notre-Dame) → |
| Platforms (B2) | Track 3 | toward Melun or Malesherbes (Gare de Lyon) → |
| Platforms (B2) | Island platform, doors will open on the left, right |
| Platforms (B2) | Track Z | Terminating trains |
| Platforms (B2) | Island platform, doors will open on the left, right |
| Platforms (B2) | Track 4 | ← toward Creil (Gare du Nord) |
| Platforms (B2) | Track 2B | ← toward Aéroport Charles de Gaulle 2 TGV or Mitry–Claye (Gare du Nord) |
| Platforms (B2) | Island platform, doors will open on the left, right |
| Platforms (B2) | Track 2A | ← toward Saint-Germain-en-Laye, Cergy-le-Haut or Poissy (Auber) |

== Renovation ==
A major renovation of the station complex and adjoining Forum des Halles shopping mall was completed in 2018, with the main aim of improving safety in the event of an emergency evacuation at peak traffic time. The renovation included the construction of a major new entrance at Place Marguerite de Navarre, with direct access to the RER station hall; the complete renovation and enlargement of the RER station hall; and extension of key escalators to lower levels of the station.

== See also ==
- List of Paris Métro stations
- List of RER stations
