= Les Halles station =

Station of the Paris Metro in France

Les Halles
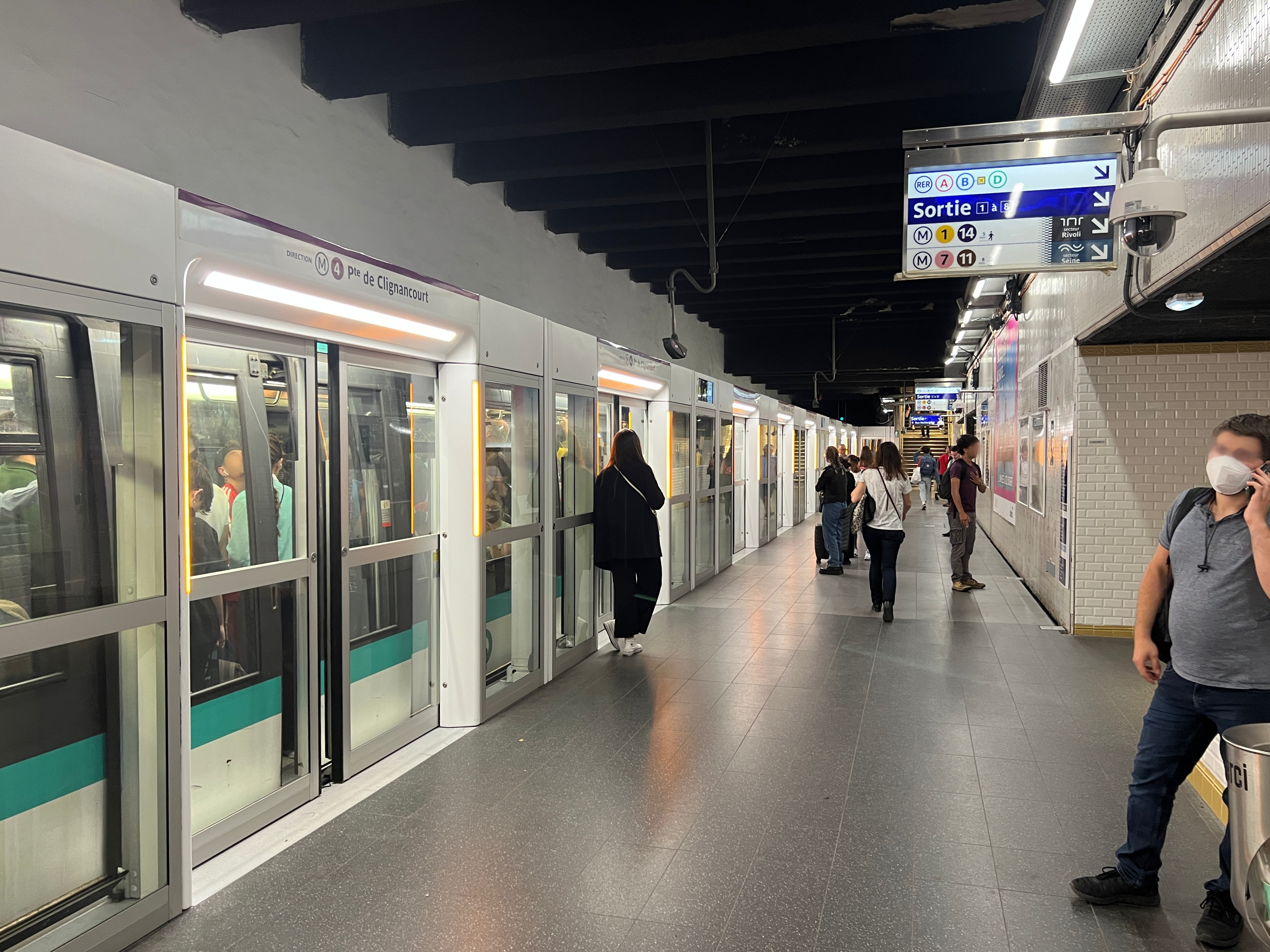
- Platforms with platform screen doors

General information
- Location: Pl. Carrée; Rue Turbigo × Rambuteau; Pl. des Verrières; 1st arrondissement of Paris; Île-de-France; France
- Coordinates: 48°51′45″N 2°20′46″E
- Owner: RATP
- Operator: RATP

Other information
- Fare zone: 1

History
- Opened: 3 October 1977; Replaced station opened on 21 April 1908
Services
Preceding station	Paris Metro	Following station
Châtelet towards Bagneux–Lucie Aubrac	Line 4	Étienne Marcel towards Porte de Clignancourt
Connections to other stations
Louvre–Rivoli towards La Défense	Line 1 transfer at Châtelet	Hôtel de Ville towards Château de Vincennes
Pont Marie towards Villejuif–Louis Aragon or Mairie d'Ivry	Line 7 transfer at Châtelet	Pont Neuf towards La Courneuve–8 mai 1945
Terminus	Line 11 transfer at Châtelet	Hôtel de Ville towards Rosny–Bois-Perrier
Pyramides towards Saint-Denis–Pleyel	Line 14 transfer at Châtelet	Gare de Lyon towards Aéroport d'Orly
Preceding station	RER	Following station
Auber towards Saint-Germain-en-Laye, Cergy-le-Haut or Poissy	RER A transfer at Châtelet–Les Halles	Gare de Lyon towards Boissy-Saint-Léger or Marne-la-Vallée–Chessy
Gare du Nord towards Aéroport Charles de Gaulle 2 TGV or Mitry–Claye	RER B transfer at Châtelet–Les Halles	St-Michel – Notre-Dame towards Robinson or Saint-Rémy-lès-Chevreuse
Gare du Nord towards Creil	RER D transfer at Châtelet–Les Halles	Gare de Lyon towards Melun or Malesherbes
Location
- Location within Paris

Les Halles station (French pronunciation: [le al]) is a station on Line 4 of the Paris Métro. Located in the 1st arrondissement, it takes its name from the market halls which were on the site for many years.

== Location ==

Established underground, Les Halles station is located on Line 4 of the Paris Métro, under the westfield Forum des Halles shopping complex between Rue Rambuteau and Rue Berger.

Corridors and underground staircases connect it to Châtelet Métro station and to Châtelet–Les Halles RER station.

== History ==
The original station on 21 April 1908 as part of the first section of the line from Châtelet to Porte de Clignancourt to serve Les Halles (old markets). The station was rebuilt and put into service on 3 October 1977 about ten metres further east to interchange with the new Châtelet–Les Halles RER station on RER A, RER B and RER D which opened on 9 December 1977. This RER station is connected by underground corridors to the Métro station Châtelet on Line 1, Line 4, Line 7, Line 11 and Line 14; Les Halles is therefore also connected with Châtelet. Line 4 is the only line that serves Les Halles; it also serves Châtelet station.

The walking distance from Line 4 at Les Halles to the far end of Châtelet (Line 7) is about 900 metres (3,000 ft). Les Halles serves the underground shopping centre Forum des Halles. One of the floors of the Forum des Halles contains the Métro station. As part of the automation of Line 4, its platforms were upgraded during the weekend of 10 and 11 June 2017, in order to receive landing doors. These are installed between the end of January and mid-February 2020.

In 2019, 16,069,170 users entered the station which placed it in ninth position among stations in the Paris metropolitan network (out of 302).

== Passenger services ==
=== Access ===
The station is accessible by an entrance to no. 230 Rue Rambuteau and by connecting corridors with Châtelet–Les Halles. It has an information area with a members counter and is equipped with automatic ticketing machines.

=== Station layout ===
G	Street Level	Exit/Entrance
B1	Mezzanine	to Exits/Entrances, connections to
Platform level	Side platform with PSDs doors will open on the right
Platform level	Platform 2	← toward Porte de Clignancourt (Étienne Marcel)
Platform level	Platform 1	toward Bagneux–Lucie Aubrac (Châtelet) →
Platform level	Side platform with PSDs doors will open on the right

=== Platforms ===
Les Halles is a standard configuration station. It has two platforms separated by metro tracks and an open load-bearing wall.

=== Other train connections ===
It allows connections with RER A, B and D of the commuter rail network via the platforms of Châtelet–Les Halles station, as well as to Line 1, Line 7, Line 11 and Line 14 of the Paris Métro at Châtelet accessed via the RER station, through pedestrian corridors.

The station, in the heart of a pedestrian area, is not served by any bus lines.

== See also ==
- Châtelet (Paris Métro)
- Châtelet–Les Halles
