= Châtelet station =

Central station in the RER and Metro services

Châtelet
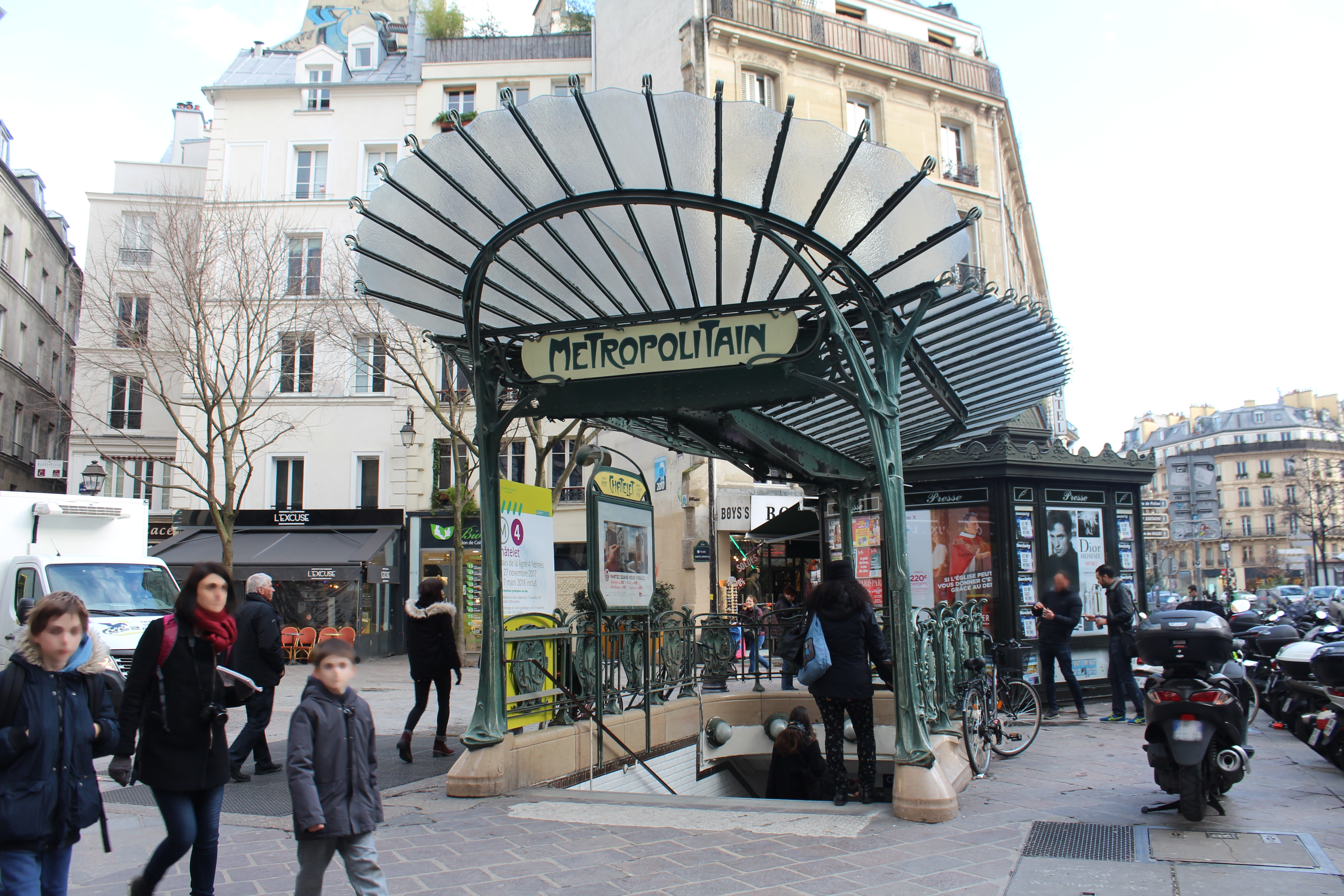
- Place Sainte-Opportune entrance in February 2018

General information
- Location: Rue des Lavandières; Place Marguerite de Navarre; 55, 63, 65 and 112, Rue de Rivoli; 7, 15 and 16, Avenue Victoria; 5, Rue Saint-Denis; 8, Place Sainte-Opportune; Place du Châtelet; 1st and 4th arrondissement of Paris; Île-de-France, France
- Coordinates: 48°51′30″N 2°20′50″E
- Owner: RATP
- Operator: RATP

Construction
- Accessible: yes

Other information
- Fare zone: 1

History
- Opened: 6 August 1900; 126 years ago (Line 1); 21 April 1908; 118 years ago (Line 4); 16 April 1926; 100 years ago (Line 7); 28 April 1935; 91 years ago (Line 11); 15 October 1998; 27 years ago (Line 14)

Passengers
- 2019: 10,766,712

Services
Preceding station	Paris Metro	Following station
Louvre–Rivoli towards La Défense	Line 1	Hôtel de Ville towards Château de Vincennes
Cité towards Bagneux–Lucie Aubrac	Line 4	Les Halles towards Porte de Clignancourt
Pont Marie towards Villejuif–Louis Aragon or Mairie d'Ivry	Line 7	Pont Neuf towards La Courneuve–8 mai 1945
Terminus	Line 11	Hôtel de Ville towards Rosny–Bois-Perrier
Pyramides towards Saint-Denis–Pleyel	Line 14	Gare de Lyon towards Aéroport d'Orly
Connections to other stations
Preceding station	RER	Following station
Auber towards Saint-Germain-en-Laye, Cergy-le-Haut or Poissy	RER A transfer at Châtelet–Les Halles	Gare de Lyon towards Boissy-Saint-Léger or Marne-la-Vallée–Chessy
Gare du Nord towards Aéroport Charles de Gaulle 2 TGV or Mitry–Claye	RER B transfer at Châtelet–Les Halles	St-Michel – Notre-Dame towards Robinson or Saint-Rémy-lès-Chevreuse
Gare du Nord towards Creil	RER D transfer at Châtelet–Les Halles	Gare de Lyon towards Melun or Malesherbes
Route map
Line 1
Line 4
Line 7
Line 11
Line 14
Location
- Location within Paris

Châtelet station (French pronunciation: [ʃɑtlɛ]) is a station of the Paris Métro and Île-de-France's RER commuter rail service, located in the centre of medieval Paris, on the border between the 1st and 4th arrondissements. It serves RER A, B and D, as well as lines 1, 4, 7, 11, and 14 of the Paris Métro; it is the southern terminus of Line 11. The station is made up of two parts connected by a long corridor: lines 7 and 11 under the Place du Châtelet and the Quai de Gesvre (site of the original medieval river port of Paris), next to the Seine; lines 1, 4 and 14 towards Rue Saint-Denis and the Rue de Rivoli.

Châtelet is connected by another long underground corridor to the southern end of the RER platforms at Châtelet–Les Halles, the northern end of which is again connected to the métro station Les Halles. The distance from Line 7 at Châtelet to the RER lines at Châtelet–Les Halles is approximately 750 metres (2,460 ft). It is the ninth-busiest station on the métro system.

== Location ==
Station layout

The station has two parts connected to each other by a long corridor equipped with two moving walkways.

They serve under the Place du Châtelet:

- line 7 under the Quai de Gesvres (between Pont-Neuf and Pont Marie);
- line 11 under Avenue Victoria (terminus preceding or following Hôtel de Ville station).

Further north, they serve:

- line 1 under Rue de Rivoli (between Louvre - Rivoli and Hôtel de Ville);
- line 4 under Rue des Halles (between Les Halles and Cité);
- line 14 diagonally between these two previous streets, parallel to line 4 (between Pyramides and Gare de Lyon stations).

The station is connected, from the northern part, by another corridor comprising three moving walkways, to the Châtelet–Les Halles RER station and, through this, to the Les Halles metro station of line 4 .

== History ==
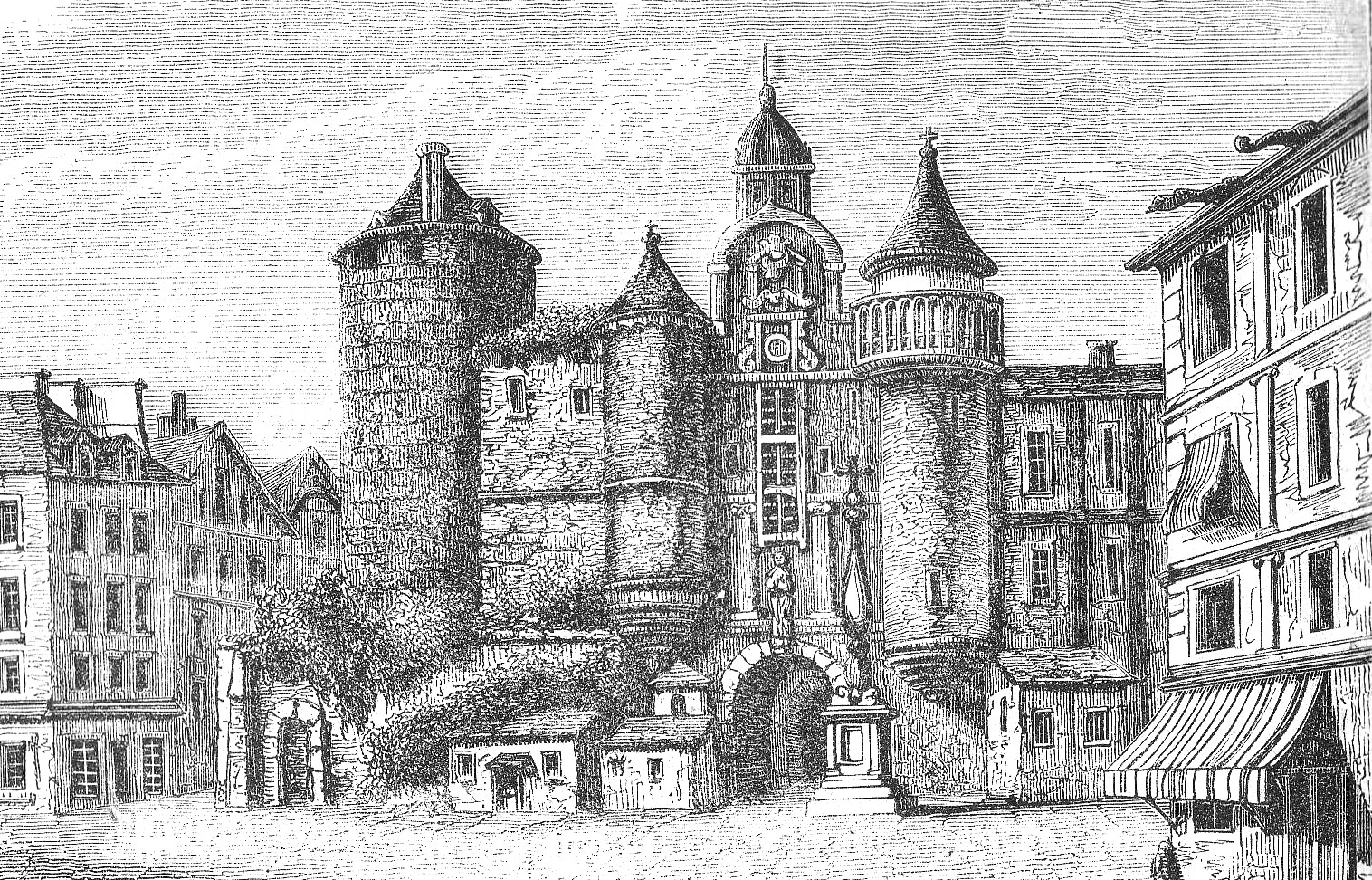
Grand Châtelet demolished in 1802

The station was opened on 6 August 1900, three weeks after trains began running on the original section of line 1 between Porte de Vincennes and Porte Maillot on 19 July 1900. The line 4 platforms were opened on 21 April 1908 as part of the original section of the line from Porte de Clignancourt to Châtelet. It was the southern terminus of line 4 until the opening of the connecting section of the line under the Seine to Raspail on 9 January 1910.

It is named after the Place du Châtelet, which is named after the Grand Châtelet, a castle over the northern approach to the old Pont au Change over the Seine to the Île de la Cité, which was demolished by Napoléon in 1802. Châtelet is a medieval French term for barbican, a small castle that commands (overlooks) a bridge or defile.

The line 7 platforms were opened on 16 April 1926 as part of the line's extension from Palais Royal to Pont Marie with the name Pont Notre-Dame-Pont au Change. It had no direct connection with Châtelet. On 15 April 1934 a connecting corridor was opened to the platforms of lines 1 and 4 and the line 7 station was renamed. The line 11 platforms were opened near the line 7 platforms on 28 April 1935 as part of the original section of the line from Châtelet to Porte des Lilas.

From May 1963 to December 1964, like the majority of the stations of line 1, its platforms were lengthened to 90 meters to accommodate trainsets of six cars to cope with significant chronic overloads. On 21 October 1964, the station was the first to be equipped with moving walkways, 132 meters long, in the corridor connecting its northern and southern parts. Like most of the stations of line 4, between October 1966 and October 1967, the platforms of the latter were in turn extended to 90 meters, in order to accommodate trains of six pneumatically-driven carriages.

On 9 December 1977 the Châtelet – Les Halles RER station was opened with a connecting corridor with a moving walkway to Châtelet. The station was partially modernized with the installation of small fine flat ceramic tiles, yellow-orange and white, in the connecting corridors of its northern part. The same year, a fresco by the French artist Hervé Mathieu-Bachelot, entitled En rouge et en blanc, was installed on a pedestal not far from the main accesses to line 4.

In 1985, the corridor connecting the northern and southern parts of the station also receives two identical mosaics by the same artist: Obliques enrubannées (work produced with André Ropion).

Like a third of the stations in the network between 1974 and 1984, all the stopping points are fitted out in the Andreu-Motte style, in yellow accompanied by flat white tiles for line 1, in red with flat white tiles on line 4, in green with the conservation of the original bevelled tiles for line 7 and in blue with the maintenance of white bevelled ceramic tiles on line 11.

As part of the automation of line 1, its station was renovated in 2009, losing its yellow Motte decoration. From the 7 and 8 March 2009, the line 1 platforms were raised during the automation of line 1, including the installation of platform screen doors in November 2010.

The line 14 platforms were opened near the line 1 and 4 platforms on 15 October 1998 as part of the original section of the line from Madeleine to Bibliothèque François Mitterrand. On 7 and 8 March 2009 the line 1 platforms were restored during the automation of line 1, including the installation of platform screen doors.

From 16 April 2013 to 25 February 2016, the corridors ensuring the connection between lines 4 and 14, which have become too cramped and congested, were widened and doubled, each with an ascending escalator. The openings of the fixed staircase, that encroached on the platforms of line 4 were then eliminated in favor of a wide opening in each side wall.

From 2014 until 15 February 2016, all the connecting corridors, except those giving access to line 14, were modernized as part of the RATP Renouveau du métro program. The station has since been divided into two distinct sectors called Sector Rivoli and Sector Seine, each distinguished by a symbol represented in relief on the ceramic friezes above the bevelled white tiling: those of the former, of bronze color, have patterns suggesting the lines of buildings on rue de Rivoli, while those on the latter, sky blue in color, are adorned with waves reminiscent of the Seine. In addition, the RER station and the neighboring Les Halles station are also referred to as Sector Forum.

In certain corridors, the bevelled white ceramic tiles have for the first time dimensions measuring twice those of the classic format, similar to the tiles at Porte d'Orléans station on line 4, and which will subsequently be deployed at Maisons-Alfort - Les Juilliottes on line 8 (from 2016) and Basilique de Saint-Denis on line 13 (in 2018). Subsequently, the names of the two sectors will be gradually added to the left of the nominative panels of the platforms (starting with line 11 in 2018 then line 1 in 2019).

The renovation of the connecting corridor from the Rivoli Sector to the Seine Sector was completed later, at the beginning of 2017. It includes in particular, the replacement of the moving walkways, now shortened, as well as the installation of wall panels intended to receive event frescoes and decorations, a specific lighting fixture, the color of which juggles between cold white, warm white and amber. The double mosaic is no longer visible.

As part of the automation of Line 4, its stopping point has been modernized since the second half of 2016, losing its red Motte style. Its platforms were raised from 27 November 2017 to 30 March 2018.

As part of the extension of Line 11 to Rosny-Bois Perrier, its terminus underwent major works from 15 March to the end of December 2019, during which time the western terminus of the line was transferred to the neighboring Hôtel de Ville. The platforms were raised, consolidated and tiled, the tracks and signage renewed and the connecting staircase doubled. The reversing headshunt is extended to the right of the central track, under the cellar of the Terminus Châtelet restaurant, in order to be able to accommodate trainsets of five cars.

In the course of the first half of 2019, the platforms of line 7 will have their masonry-style Motte benches in green tiling removed, as will the characteristic coque seats, in favor of contemporary seats, which were installed during the summer.

=== Usage ===
In 2019, according to RATP estimates, 10.8 million travelers entered this station, which places it in 12th position among metro stations for its use out of 302.

== Passenger services ==
=== Access ===
The station has several metro entrances:

- Entrance 1: rue de Rivoli: 112, rue de Rivoli
- Entrance 2: Porte Lescot Forum des Halles Center G. Pompidou
- Entrance 4: avenue Victoria: 9, avenue Victoria
- Entrance 5: place du Châtelet: a staircase, place du Châtelet
- Entrance 6: place Sainte-Opportune: 8, place Sainte-Opportune
- Entrance 7: rue des Lavandières: a staircase at 19, rue des Lavandières
- Entrance 8: rue Saint-Denis: 5, rue Saint-Denis
- Entrance 9: rue de la Lingerie: a staircase at the corner of rue des Halles and rue de la Lingerie
- Entrance 10: rue de la Ferronnerie: an elevator facing 12 or 33, rue de la Ferronnerie
- Entrance 11: rue Bertin-Poirée: 20, rue Bertin Poirée
- Entrance 12: Châtelet theater: 17, avenue Victoria
- Entrance 13: Théâtre de la Ville: 15, avenue Victoria
- Entrance 15: rue Saint-Martin: 13, avenue Victoria
- Entrance 16: avenue Victoria: 16, avenue Victoria

=== Station layout ===
G	Street Level	Exit/Entrance
B1	Mezzanine	to Exits/Entrances, connections to
Line 1 platforms (B2)	Side platform with PSDs, doors will open on the right
Line 1 platforms (B2)	Platform 1	← toward La Défense (Louvre–Rivoli)
Line 1 platforms (B2)	Platform 2	toward Château de Vincennes (Hôtel de Ville) →
Line 1 platforms (B2)	Side platform with PSDs, doors will open on the right
Line 7 platforms (B2)	Side platform, doors will open on the right
Line 7 platforms (B2)	Platform 2	← toward Villejuif–Louis Aragon or Mairie d'Ivry (Pont Marie)
Line 7 platforms (B2)	Platform 1	toward La Courneuve–8 mai 1945 (Pont Neuf) →
Line 7 platforms (B2)	Side platform, doors will open on the right
Line 11 platforms (B3)	Side platform, doors will open on the right
Line 11 platforms (B3)	Platform 1	← Alighting passengers only
Line 11 platforms (B3)	Platform 2	toward Rosny–Bois-Perrier (Hôtel de Ville) →
Line 11 platforms (B3)	Island platform, doors will open on the left, right
Line 11 platforms (B3)	Platform 4	toward Rosny–Bois-Perrier (Hôtel de Ville) →
Line 4 platforms (B4)	Side platform with PSDs, doors will open on the right
Line 4 platforms (B4)	Platform 2	← toward Porte de Clignancourt (Les Halles)
Line 4 platforms (B4)	Platform 1	toward Bagneux–Lucie Aubrac (Cité) →
Line 4 platforms (B4)	Side platform with PSDs, doors will open on the right
Line 14 platforms (B6)	Side platform with PSDs, doors will open on the right
Line 14 platforms (B6)	Platform 2	← toward Saint-Denis–Pleyel (Pyramides)
Line 14 platforms (B6)	Platform 1	toward Aéroport d'Orly (Gare de Lyon) →
Line 14 platforms (B6)	Side platform with PSDs, doors will open on the right

=== Platforms ===
All lines except line 11 have standard configuration stations, with two platforms framing two tracks under an elliptical arch.

The platforms of line 1 are decorated with white and flat ceramic tiles that cover the vault and the tunnel exits. The lighting is of the Gaudin type typical of the metro revival of the 2000s and the platforms are equipped with platform doors. The advertising frames are metallic and the walls are equipped with wooden panels crowned with the name of the station, back-lit and written in Parisine font.

The platforms of line 4 are decorated in the Andreu-Motte style in red, with flat tiles from the 1970s until 2018. As part of the automation of the line, these platforms were still under construction in 2019, the Andreu-Motte style having been entirely cast out.

The platforms of line 7 are decorated in the Andreu-Motte style in an apple green color, associated with the original decoration of the CMP, characterized by bevelled white tiles, advertising frames in honey-colored earthenware. The name of the station is supplemented by its old name, (Pont au Change), also written in earthenware. At the eastern end of the station, the unusually high vault gives way to a footbridge spanning the tracks. In 1642, Louis XIII ceded land to the Marquis de Gesvres and demanded that he establish, under the platform which today bears his name, a gallery made up of arcades overlooking the Seine. Nicknamed cagnards, these unsanitary vaults quickly became a den for the thugs of the capital. After being condemned in the 19th century, they were brought to light in 1921 during the construction of the metro. At the request of the Commission du Vieux Paris, the structure was preserved and integrated into the station, which explains this unusual configuration.

The line 11 station is special: it has two platforms flanking two tracks as well as a third track on the south side, due to its role as terminus. It is decorated in the Andreu-Motte style in blue color. The name of the station is indicated on enamel plaques. In 2018, these were renewed, from a font in capital letters, to the Parisine font, and losing the old subtitle Avenue Victoria.

Line 14 station has the amenities specific to this line with a sober and modern decoration combining wood and concrete. It has a monumental vault and the platforms are equipped with landing doors.

=== Bus connections ===
The station is served by lines 21, 38, 47, 58, 67, 69, 70, 72, 74, 75, 76, 85 and 96 of the RATP Bus Network and, at night, by lines N11, N12, N13, N14, N15, N16, N21, N22, N23, N24 of the Noctilien bus network.

== Gallery ==
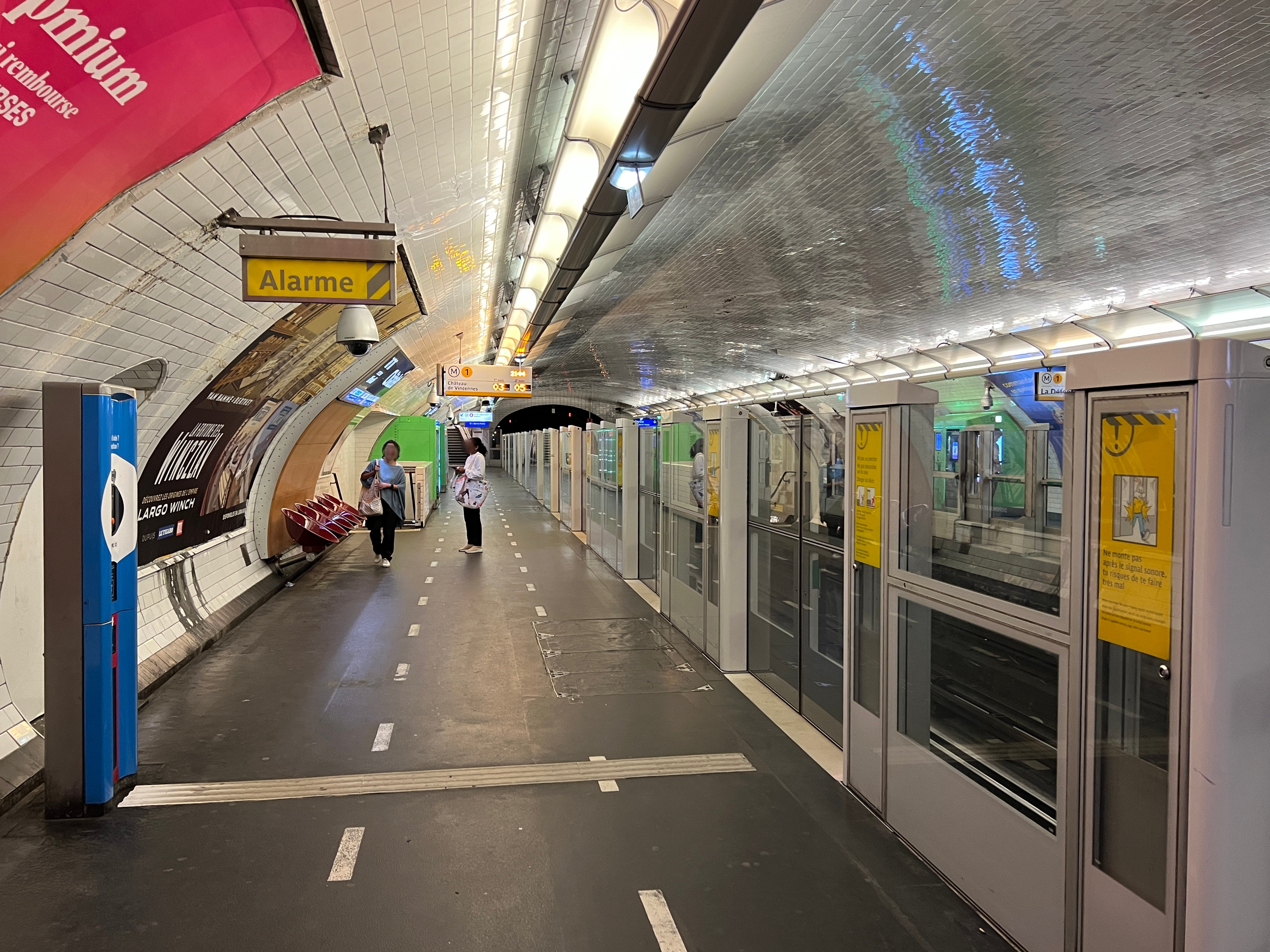
Line 1

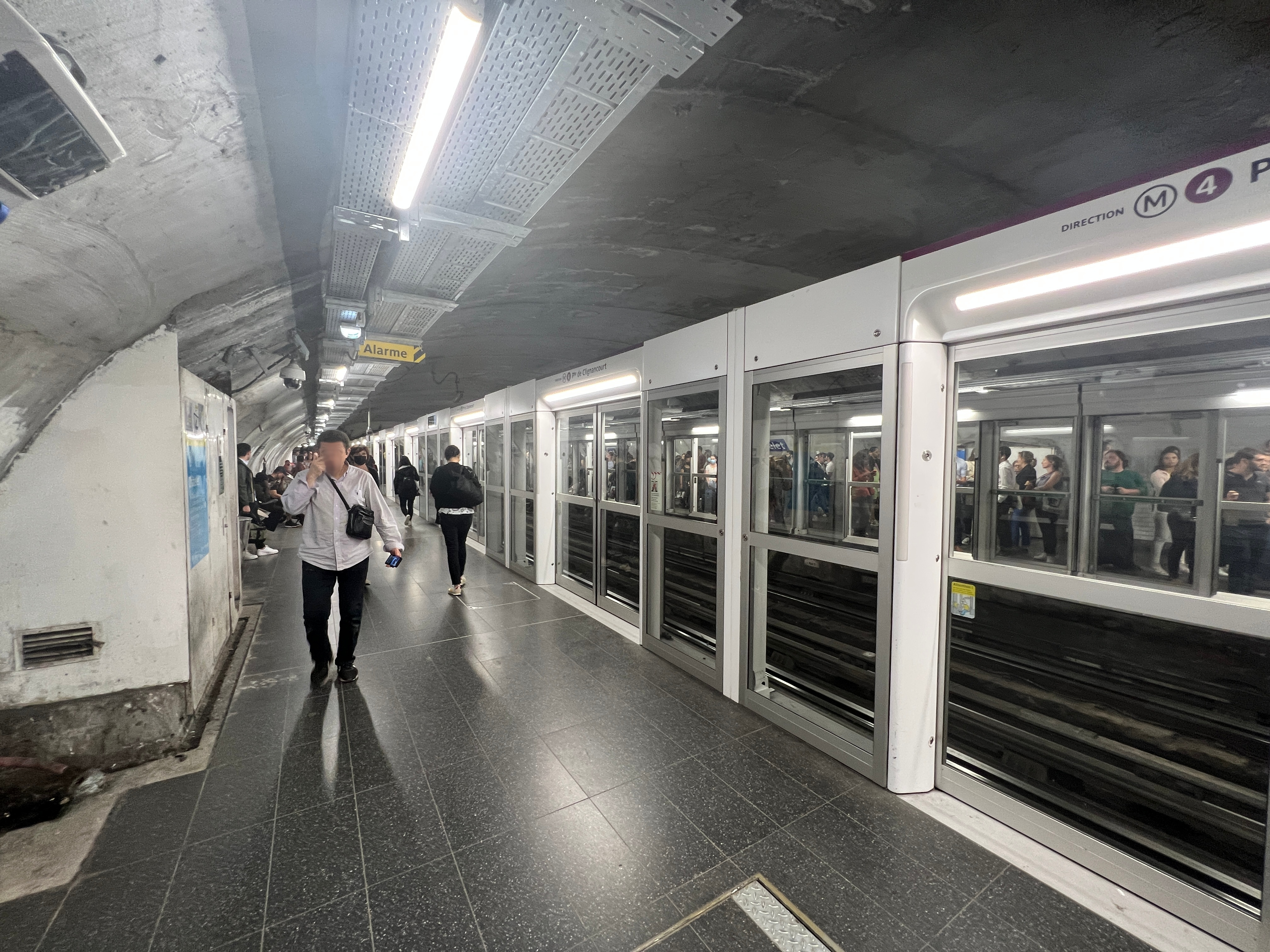
Line 4

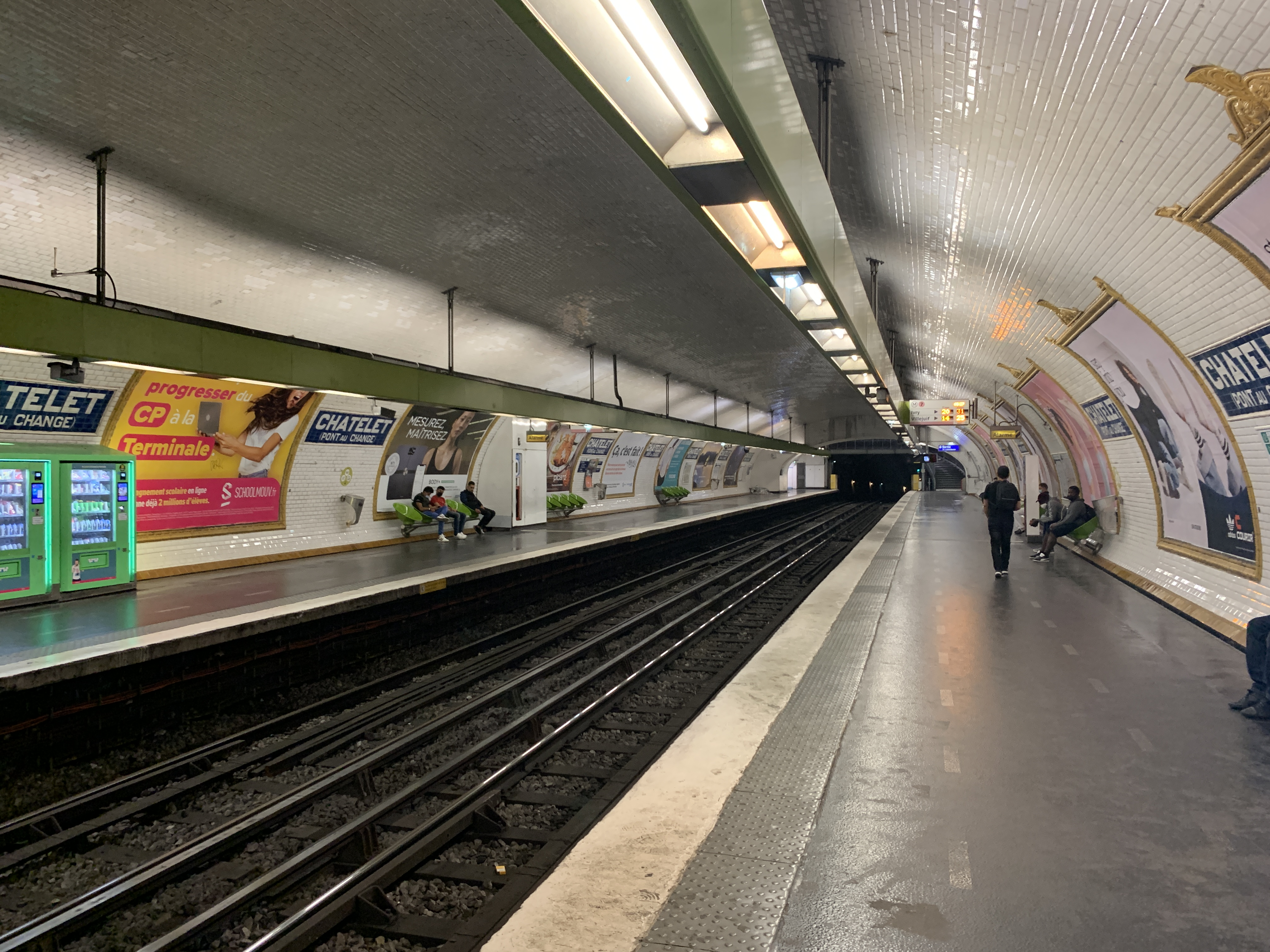
Line 7

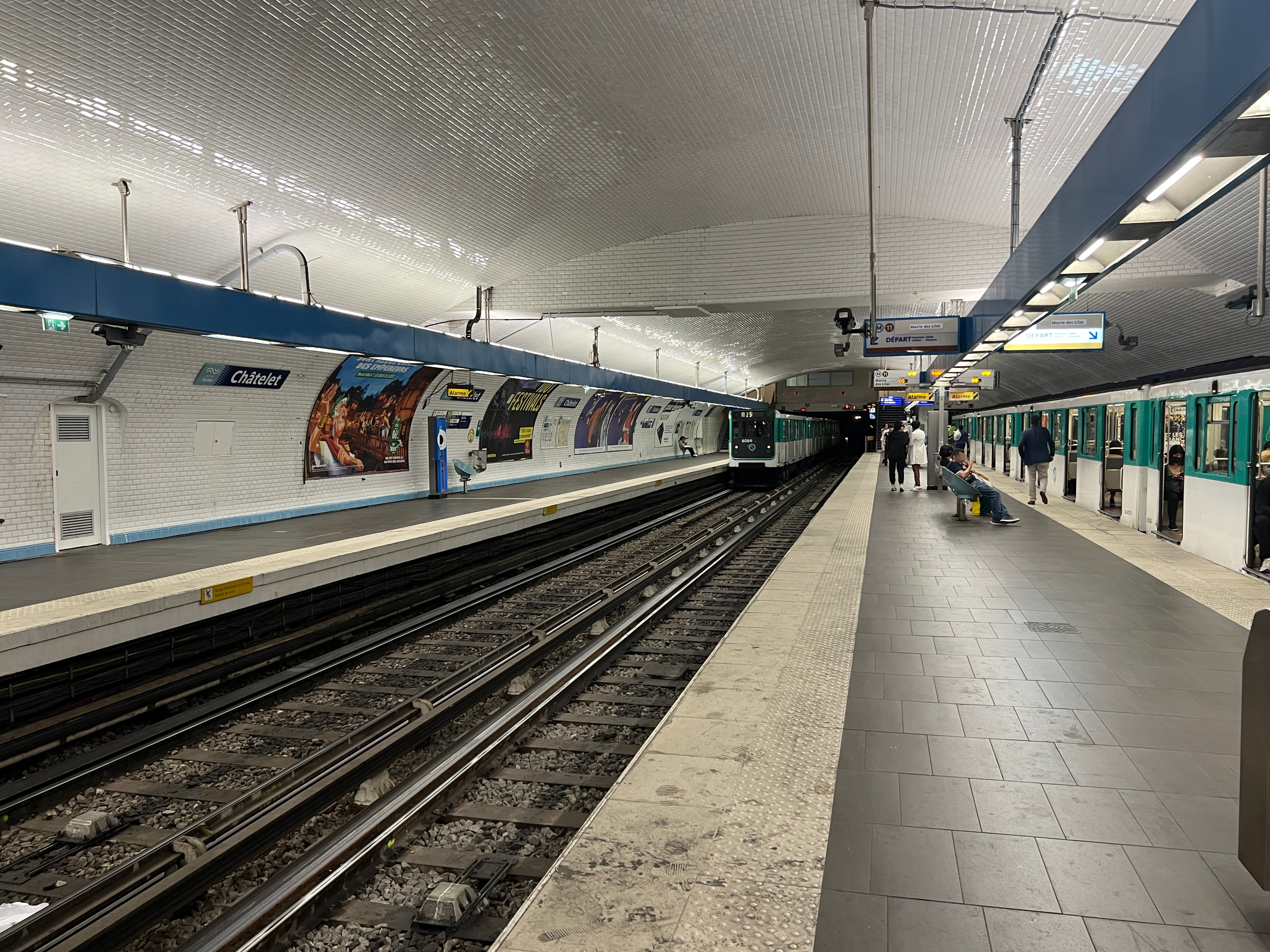
Line 11

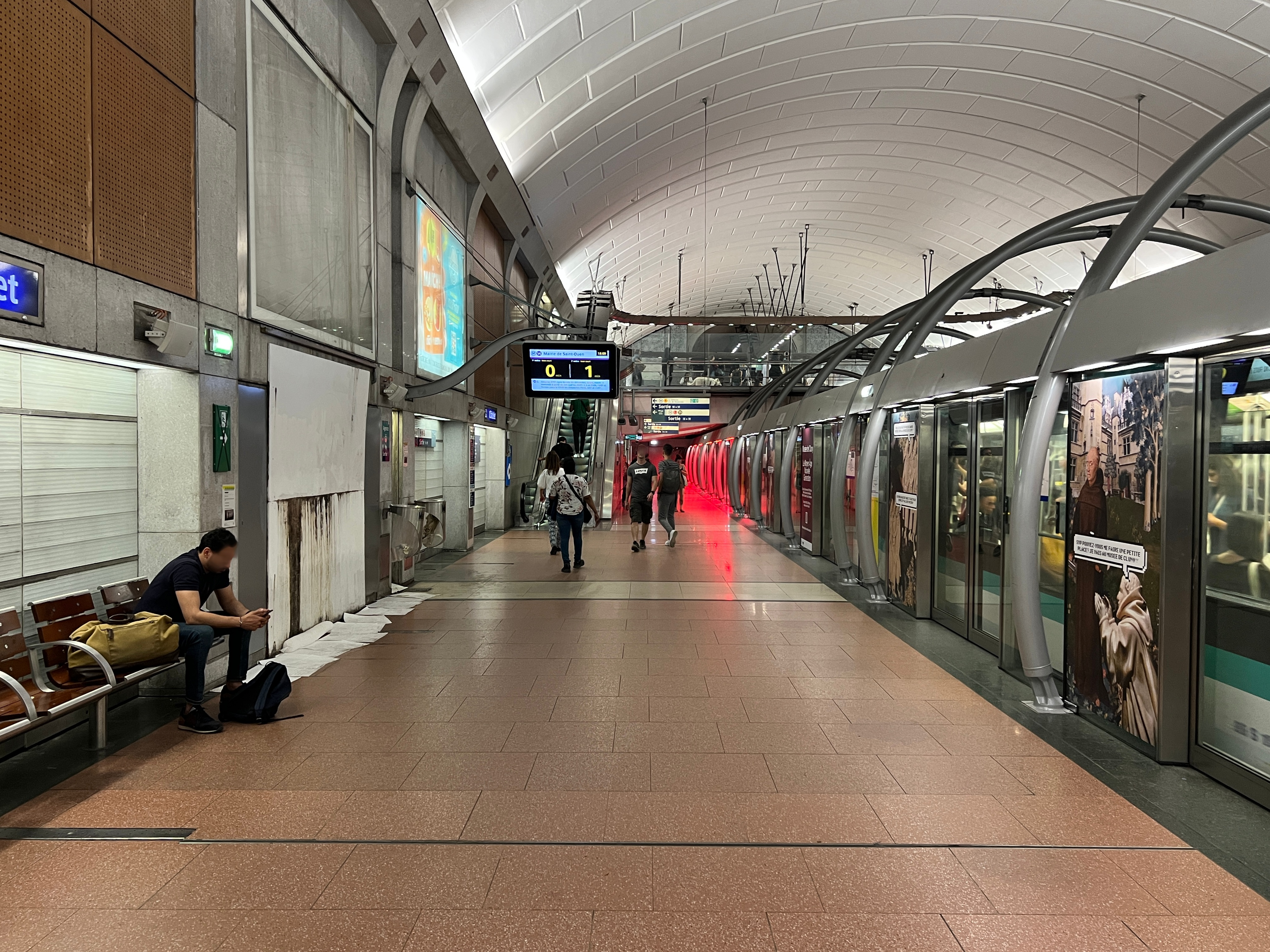
Line 14

== See also ==
- Les Halles (Paris Métro)
- Châtelet–Les Halles station
