= Place Colette =

Square in Paris, France

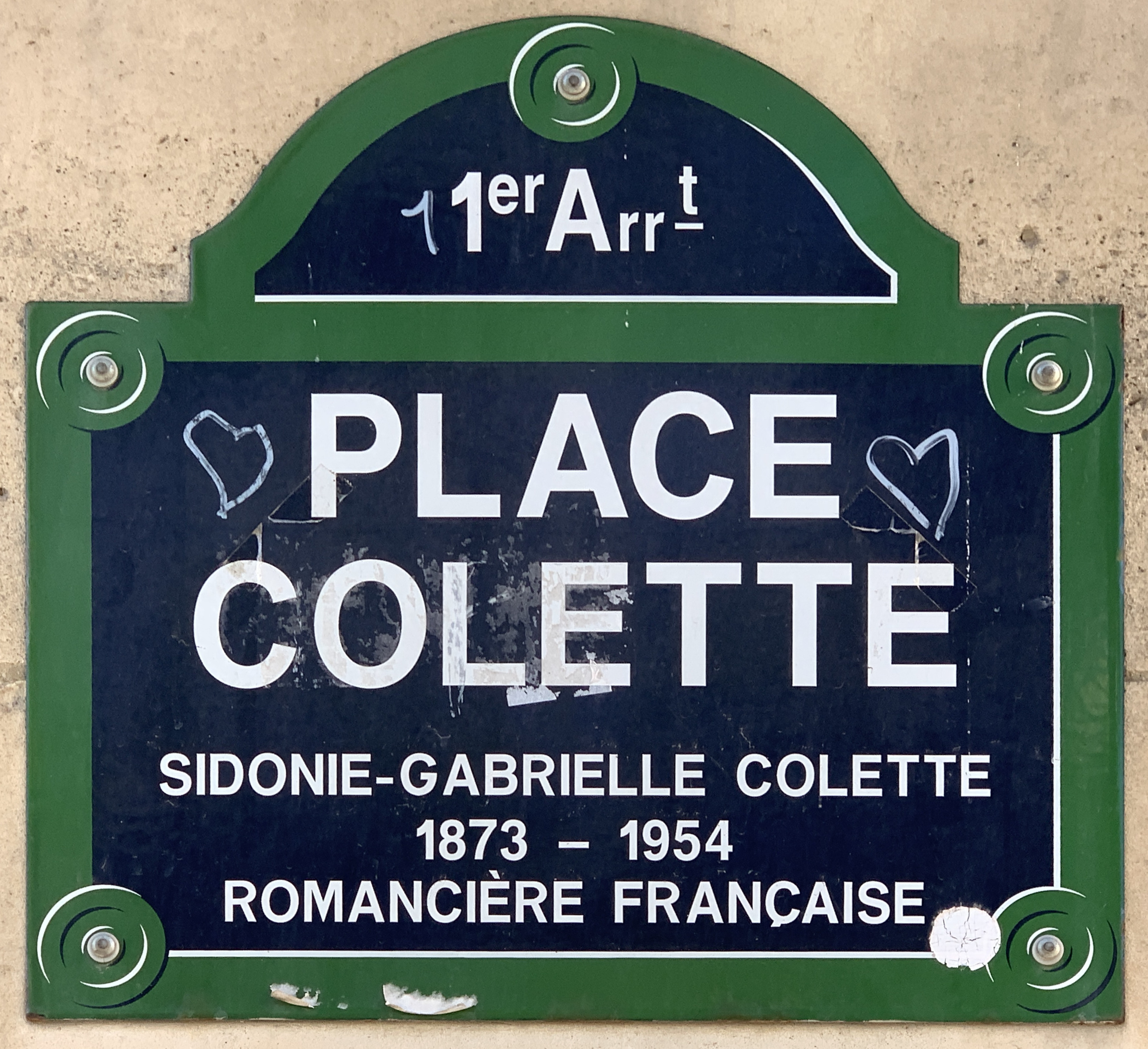
- Former name(s): none
- Namesake: Sidonie-Gabrielle Colette
- Arrondissement: 1st arrondissement
- Coordinates: 48.86322°N 2.33590°E

Construction
- Inauguration: 19 February 1966

The Place Colette is a square in the 1st arrondissement of Paris, France.

== Location and access ==
The square is bordered to the north and east by wings of the Palais-Royal (containing, to the north, the Comédie-Française and to the east, the Conseil d'État), to the south by the Rue Saint-Honoré and to the west by the Rue de Richelieu.

An entrance to the Palais Royal–Musée du Louvre Métro station, serving lines and, is on the Place Colette. It was redesigned by Jean-Michel Othoniel as the Kiosque des noctambules (Kiosk of the night-walkers), completed in October 2000 for the centenary of the Métro.

== History ==
The Place Colette had no name (it was simply part of the Rue Saint-Honoré) until 1966 when it was named after the writer Colette following a request by her only daughter, Colette de Jouvenel, to André Malraux who was then Minister of Culture.

== Film location ==
The café "Le Nemours", in the façade of the Conseil d'État, has been used as a location for several films:

- Conversations with My Gardener (2007)
- The Tourist (2010)
- The Intouchables (2011)
