= Palais Royal–Musée du Louvre station =

Paris Métro station

Palais Royal Musée du Louvre
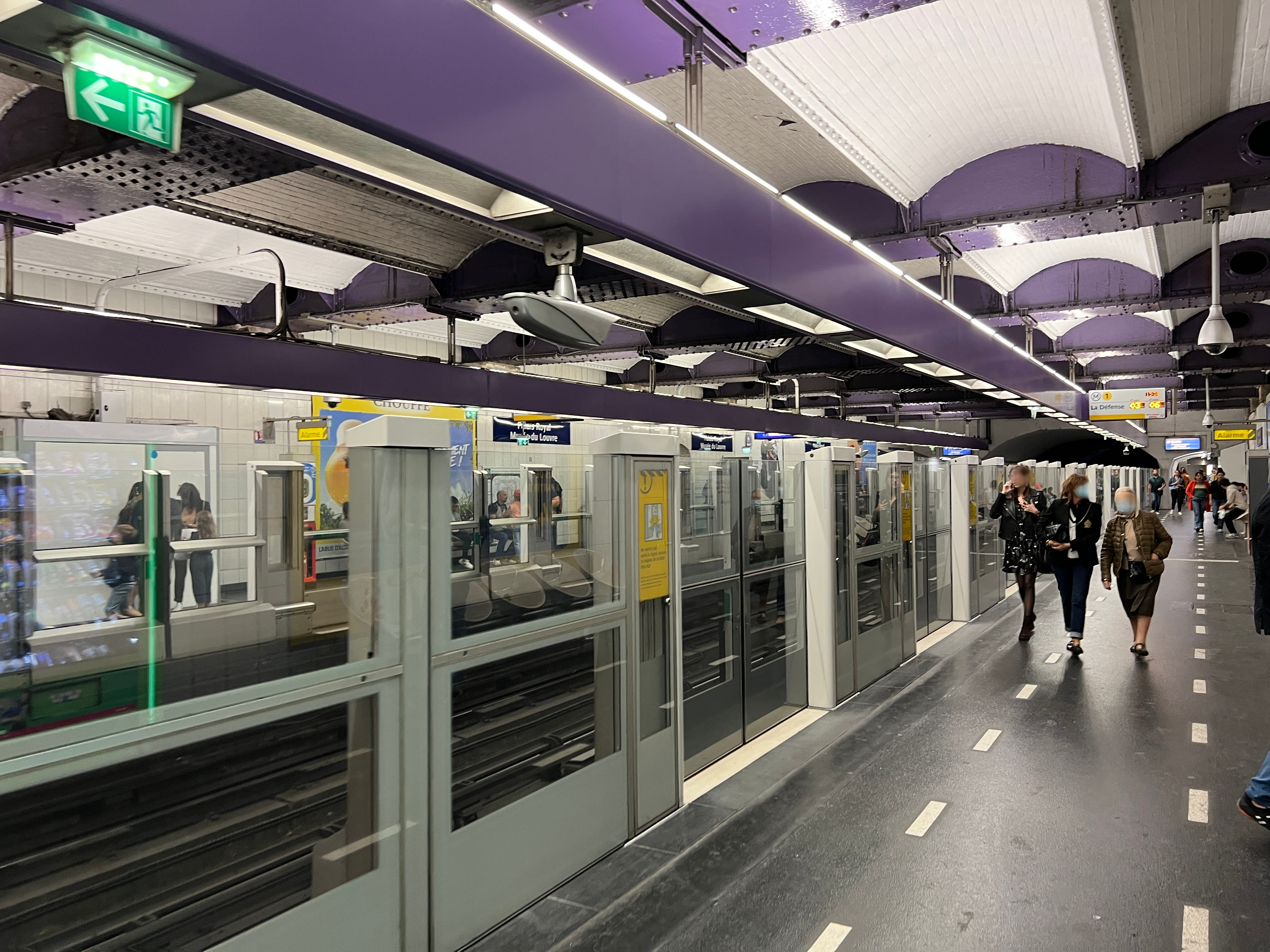
- Line 1 platforms

General information
- Location: 93, Rue de Rivoli; Place du Palais-Royal (five); Place Colette; 1st arrondissement of Paris; Île-de-France; France
- Coordinates: 48°51′46″N 2°20′12″E
- Owner: RATP
- Operator: RATP

Other information
- Fare zone: 1

History
- Opened: 19 July 1900; 126 years ago (Line 1); 1 July 1916; 110 years ago (Line 7)
- Former names: Palais Royal (1900–1989)

Services
Preceding station	Paris Metro	Following station
Tuileries towards La Défense	Line 1	Louvre–Rivoli towards Château de Vincennes
Pont Neuf towards Villejuif–Louis Aragon or Mairie d'Ivry	Line 7	Pyramides towards La Courneuve–8 mai 1945
Route map
Line 1
Line 7
Location
- Location within Paris

Palais Royal–Musée du Louvre (French pronunciation: [palɛ ʁwajal myze dy luvʁ]) is a station on Line 1 and Line 7 of the Paris Métro. Situated in the heart of the 1st arrondissement, it most notably serves the Palais-Royal, Comédie-Française and Louvre.

== Location ==
The station is located under the Place du Palais-Royal, between the Palais-Royal and the Louvre Museum, the platforms being established (almost parallel):

- on Line 1, under the Rue de Rivoli;
- on Line 7, under Rue Saint-Honoré.

== History ==
It is one of the eight original stations opened as part of the first section of Line 1 between Porte de Vincennes and Porte Maillot on 19 July 1900, under the name Palais Royal. The Line 7 platforms were opened on 1 July 1916 with the extension of the line from Opéra. It was the southern terminus of the line until it was extended to Pont Marie on 16 April 1926. From the 1970s until the 2010s, the station was modernized with the installation of orange ceramic tiles typical of the Mouton-Duvernet style, laid horizontally and aligned. The station was given its current name in 1989, soon after the opening of the new entrance to the Louvre Museum. It is named after the nearby Palais Royal and the Louvre.

The entrance on Place Colette was redesigned by Jean-Michel Othoniel, as the "Kiosque des noctambules" (Kiosk of the night-walkers), and completed in October 2000 for the centenary of the Métro. Two cupolas of the "Kiosque des noctambules" (one representing the day, the other the night) are made of colored glass beads that are threaded to structure of aluminum.

As part of the automation of line 1, its platforms were upgraded during the weekend of 7 and 8 February 2009, then fitted with platform screen doors in October 2010. The corridors of the station were renovated a second time on 31 December 2014, reviving the bevelled white tiling as part of the RATP un métro + beau program.

In 2018, the masonry benches on the platforms of line 7, fitted with flat brown tiles, part of the Andreu-Motte style of the station, were covered with smaller orange flat tiles, thus being consistent with the seats and the lighting fittings, but no longer with the outlets of the corridors, as the Andreu-Motte style originally wanted.

In 2019, 9,592,920 travelers entered this station, which placed it in 18th position for metro stations in terms of its usage.

Attractions accessible from this metro station include the Louvre, the Place du Carrousel, and the Carrousel du Louvre shopping mall.

== Passenger services ==
=== Access ===
Since the renovation of the Louvre museum, each of the platforms of line 1 has been linked to an underground shopping mall, the Carrousel du Louvre, providing access to the museum's underground hall. This is exit number 1.

The Kiosque des Noctambules is a contemporary work of art covering one of the metro entrances (exit 5) leading to Place Colette. Built for the centenary of the Paris metro and produced under the direction of the artist Jean-Michel Othoniel in a controversial style, it was inaugurated in October 2000.

The station has the following five accesses:

- Entrance 1: Louvre museum;
- Entrance 2: Place du Palais-Royal;
- Entrance 3: Rue de Rivoli;
- Entrance 4: Rue de Valois;
- Entrance 5: Place Colette, Kiosque des Noctambules.

Exits 2 and 3 are adorned with Guimard entrances, which are listed as historical monuments by the decree of 29 May 1978.

In an access corridor, another work of art, La Pensée et l'Âme Huicholes was the subject of an exchange intended to celebrate the thirty years of cooperation between the metro companies of Mexico City and Paris. The Parisian station thus houses an indigenous fresco, La Pensée et l'Âme huicholes, developed by the shaman Santos de la Torre and composed of two million pearls of 2 mm in diameter. In exchange, the City of Mexico received on 14 November 1998 a Hector Guimard-style entrance, which it installed at the Bellas Artes metro station.

=== Station layout ===
Street Level

B1	Connecting level

Line 1 platforms	Side platform with PSDs, doors will open on the right
Line 1 platforms	Westbound	← toward La Défense–Grande Arche (Tuileries)
Line 1 platforms	Eastbound	toward Château de Vincennes (Louvre–Rivoli) →
Line 1 platforms	Side platform with PSDs, doors will open on the right

Line 7 platforms	Side platform, doors will open on the right
Line 7 platforms	Southbound	← toward Villejuif–Louis Aragon or Mairie d'Ivry (Pont Neuf)
Line 7 platforms	Northbound	toward La Courneuve–8 mai 1945 (Pyramides) →
Line 7 platforms	Side platform, doors will open on the right

=== Platforms ===
The platforms of the two lines are of standard configuration. There are two per stopping point and are separated by the metro tracks located in the center.

Line 1 station platform is flush with the walls. The ceiling is made up of a metal deck, the beams of which are supported by vertical walls. A 15-meter-long crypt, the ceiling of which rests on closely spaced pillars, extends at western end for the introduction of the six-car train line in the 1960s. Furnished in the Andreu-Motte style, the station along with Opéra on line 3 and Concorde on line 8, they are only three stations decorated in this way, in purple, forming part of the lexicon of exceptional colors of this style. It is applied to light fittings, deck beams and seats. The benches, tunnel exits and platforms are fitted with large flat white tiles with a glazed appearance, while the outlets in the corridors are treated with classic beveled white tiles. The advertising frames are metallic and the name of the station is written in Parisine font on enamelled plates.

Line 7 station is curved and has an elliptical arch. However, it is distinguished by the lower part of the wall which are vertical and not curved, and its platforms are slightly offset from one another. Like those of line 1, they are furnished in the Andreu-Motte style with two orange light fittings, the corridor outlets in flat brown tiles and orange Motte seats. The latter are fixed on masonry benches covered with flat orange tiles of a smaller size than usual. This new tiling is therefore now consistent with the lighting strips and the seats they support; on the other hand, they are no longer in harmony with the tiles of the outlets of the corridors, neither by their size nor by their color, going against the original principles of the Andreu-Motte style. The bevelled white ceramic tiles cover the walls, the vault and the tunnel exits. The stair stringers and the walkway are treated in flat white tiles aligned horizontally. The advertising frames are metallic and the name of the station is written in Parisine font on enamel plates.

=== Bus connections ===
The station is served by lines 21, 27, 39, 67, 68, 69, 72 and 95 of the RATP Bus Network as well as by the tourist line OpenTour. At night, the station is served by lines N11 and N24 of the Noctilien bus network.

== Nearby ==
- Louvre Pyramid
- Conseil d'État (France)
- Constitutional Council (France)

== Gallery ==
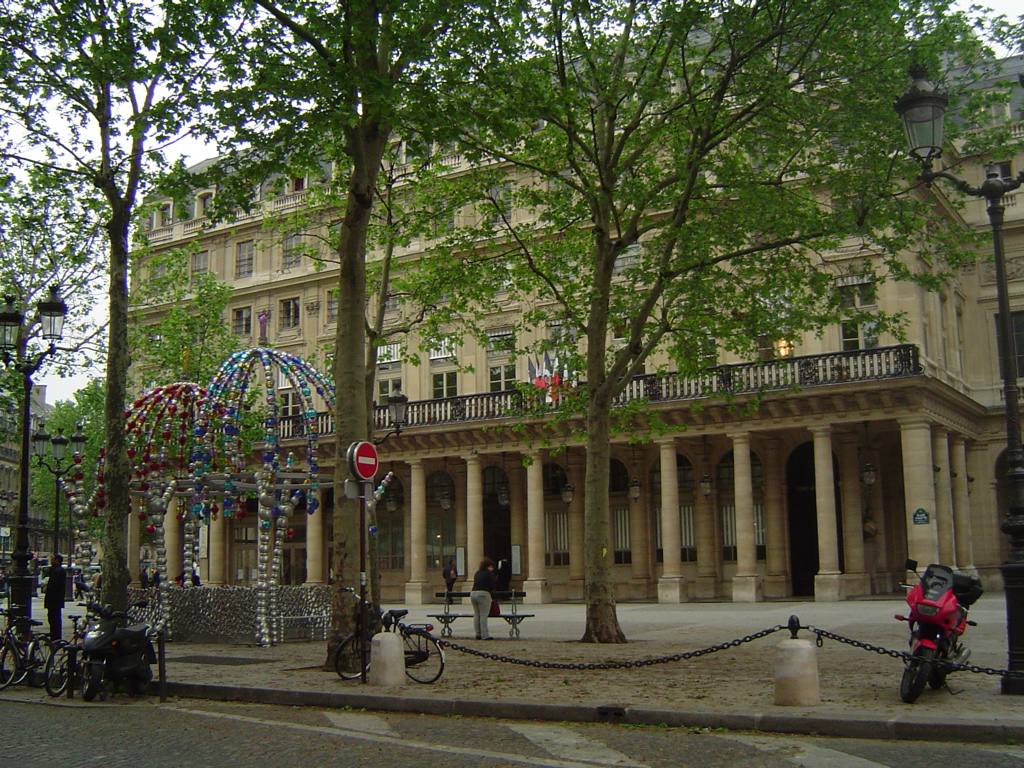
Place Colette with the "Kiosque des noctambules" (left). The building in the background is the Comédie-Française

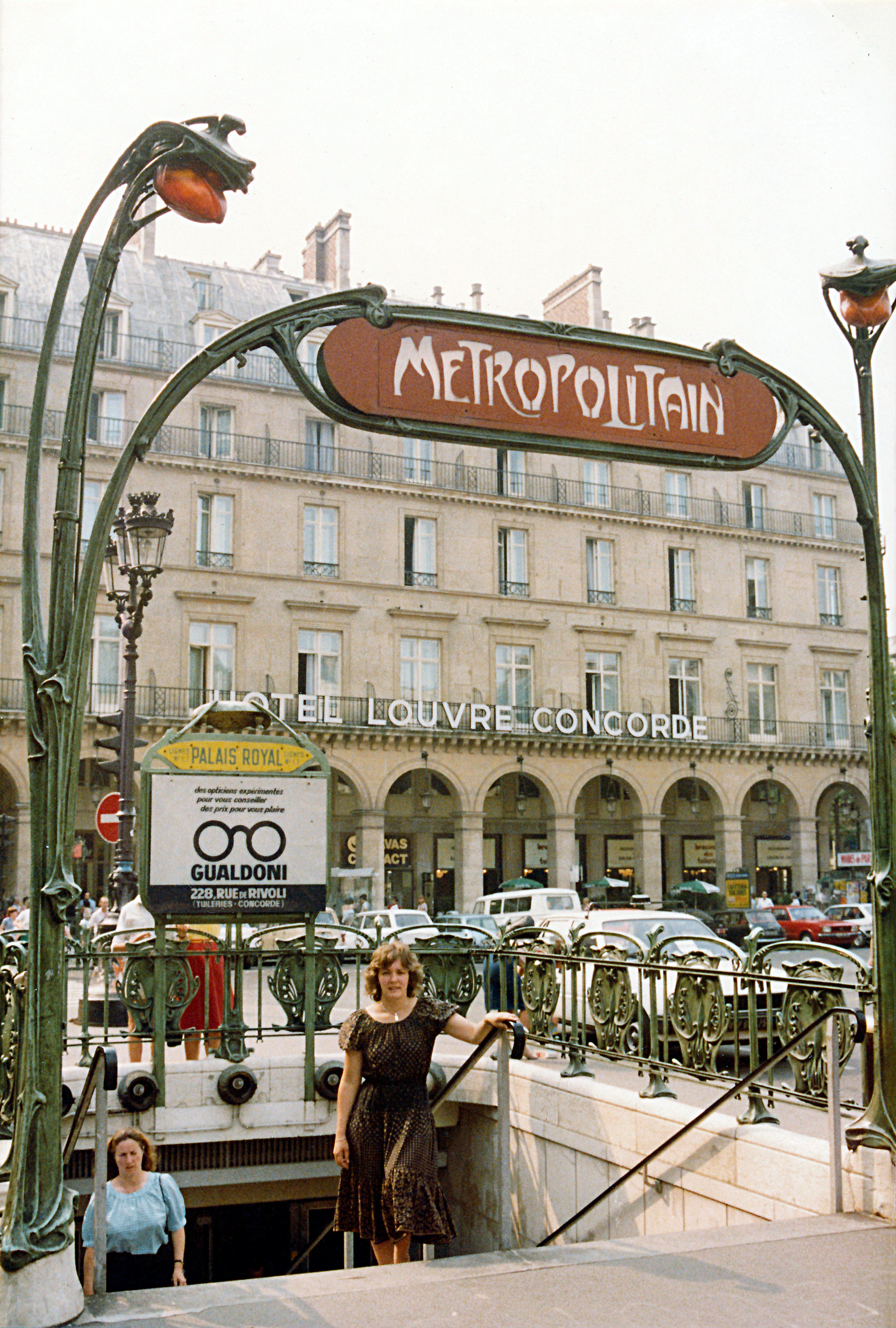
Station entrance (1983).

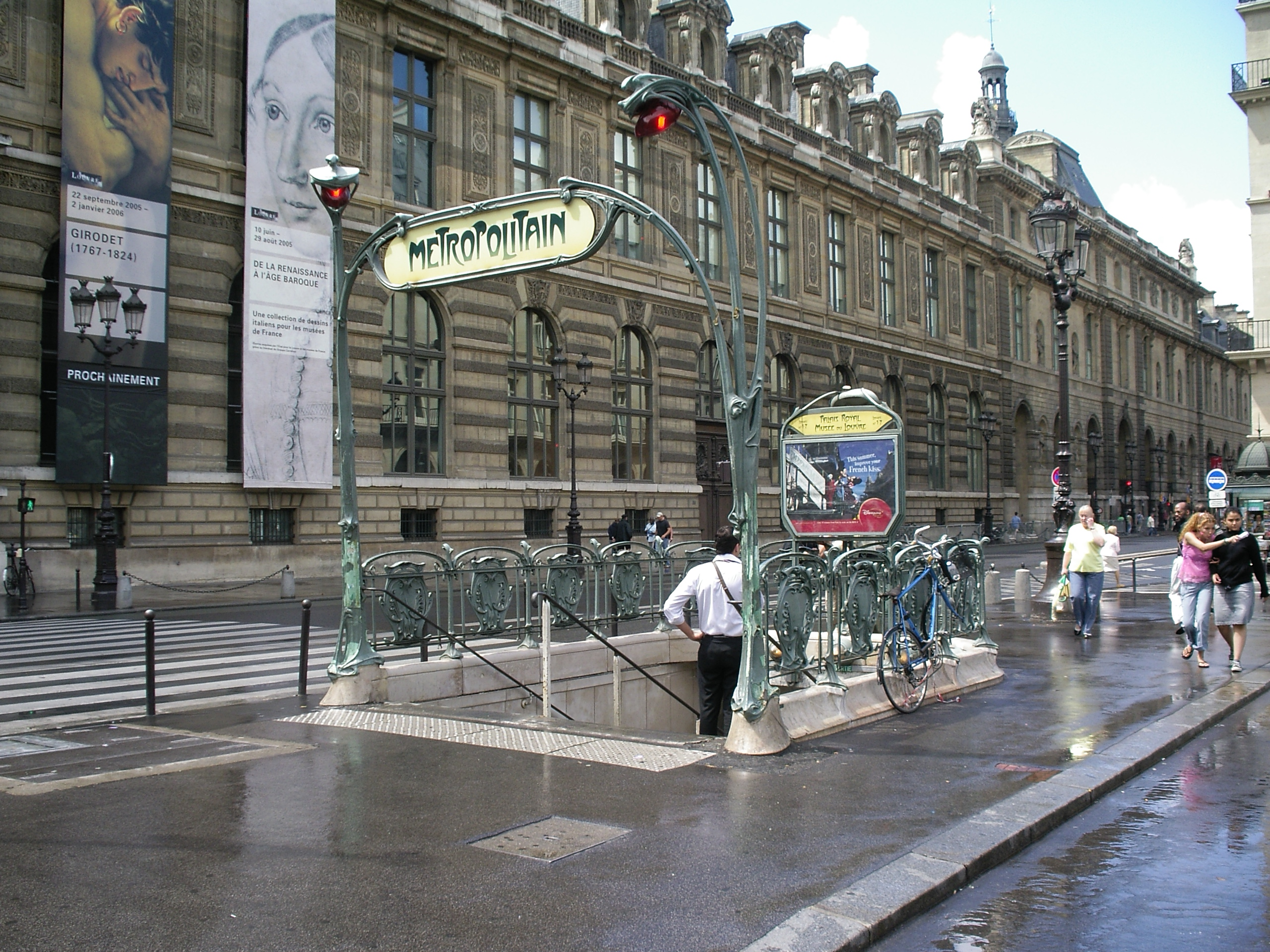
Station entrance

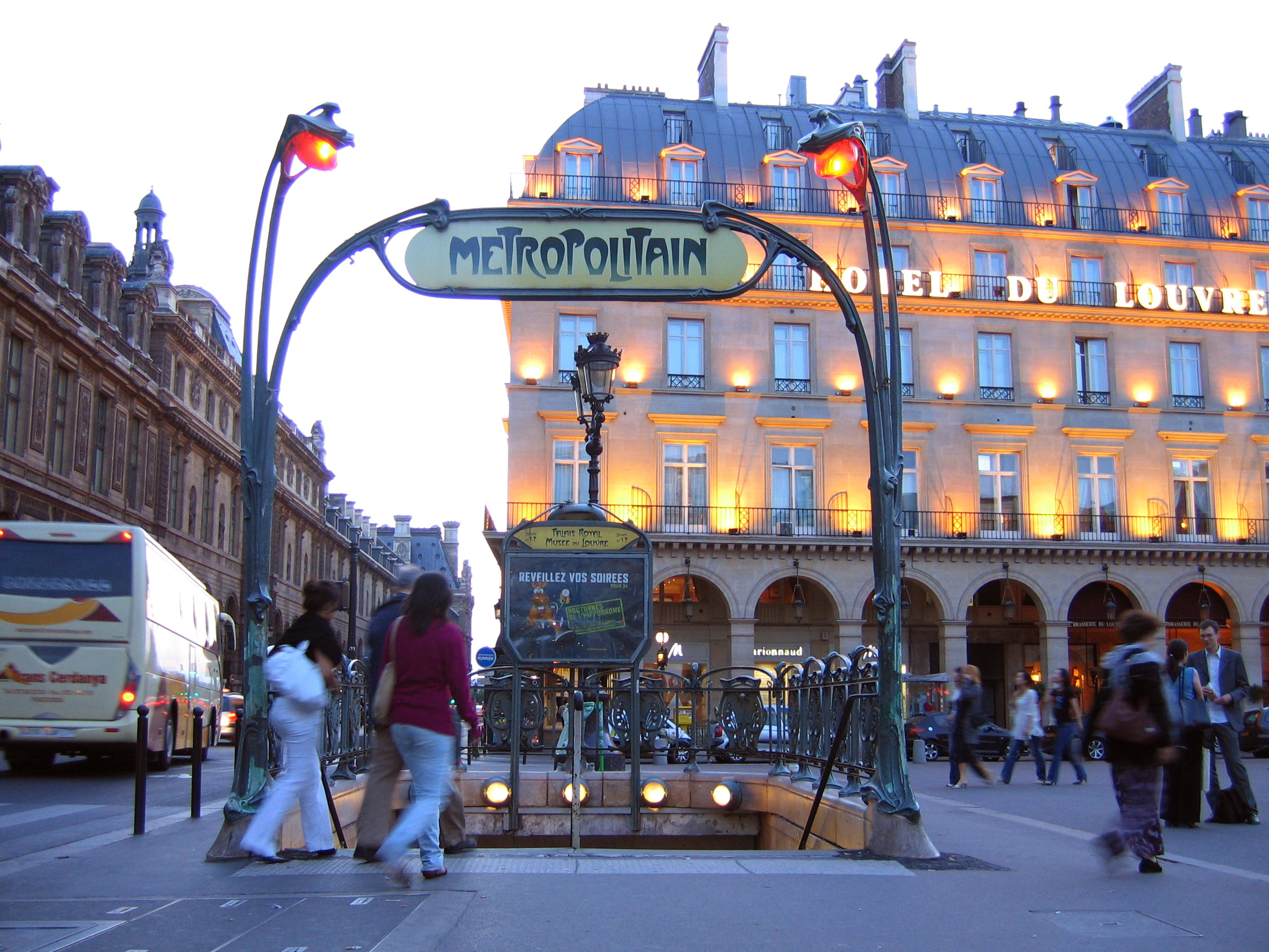
Station entrance

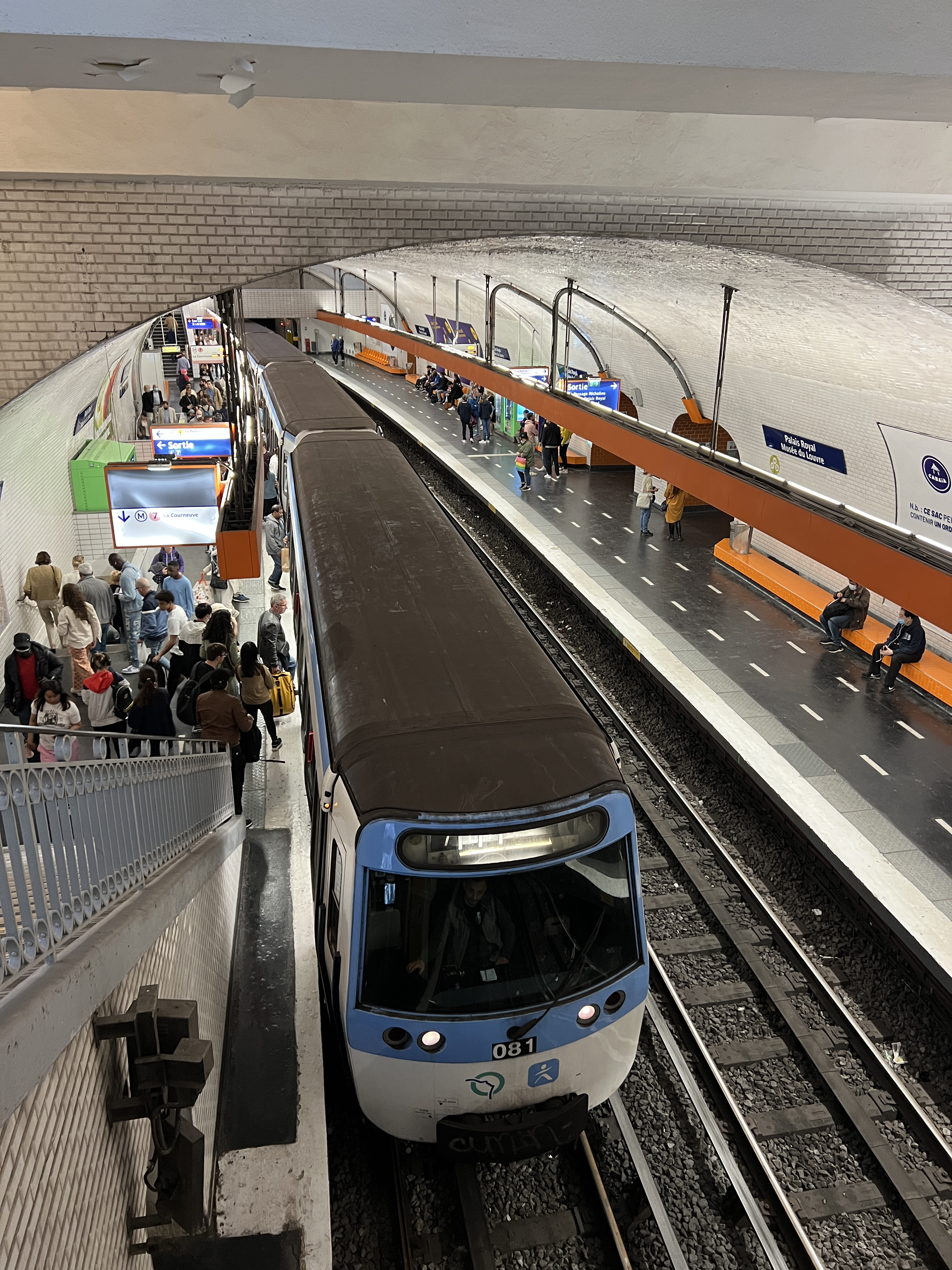
Line 7 platforms
