= Jean-Michel Othoniel =

French sculptor (born 1964)

- Born: 27 January 1964 (age 62); Saint-Etienne, France
- Occupation: Contemporary artist

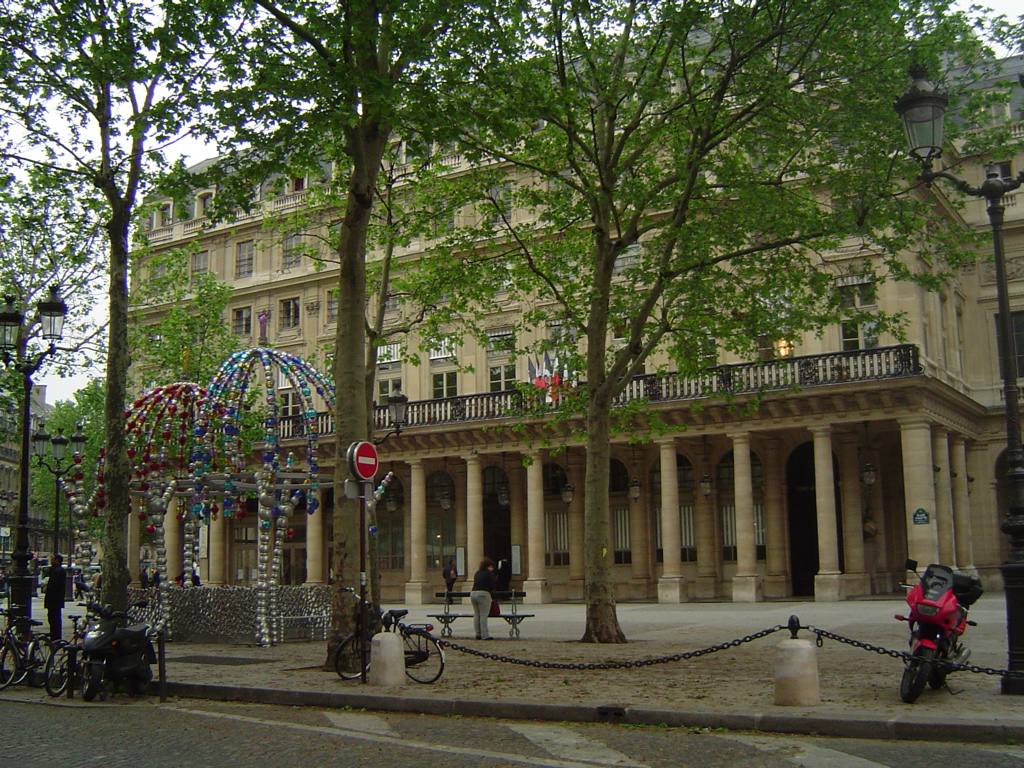
The place Colette in Paris; Othoniel's entrance to the métro station is on the left.

Jean-Michel Othoniel (born 27 January 1964) is a French contemporary artist. He has worked in a variety of artistic media, including film, installation, photography, and sculpture. In 2000, he designed a new entrance for the Palais Royal–Musée du Louvre station of the Paris Métro.

In 2006, he showed necklaces of large beads, made by master glass-blowers in Murano, at the Peggy Guggenheim Collection in Venice; they were hung on the façade of the Palazzo Venier dei Leoni, which houses the collection.

== Public collections ==
- Museum of Modern Art, New York, US
