= Pont Neuf station =

Metro station in Paris, France

Pont Neuf
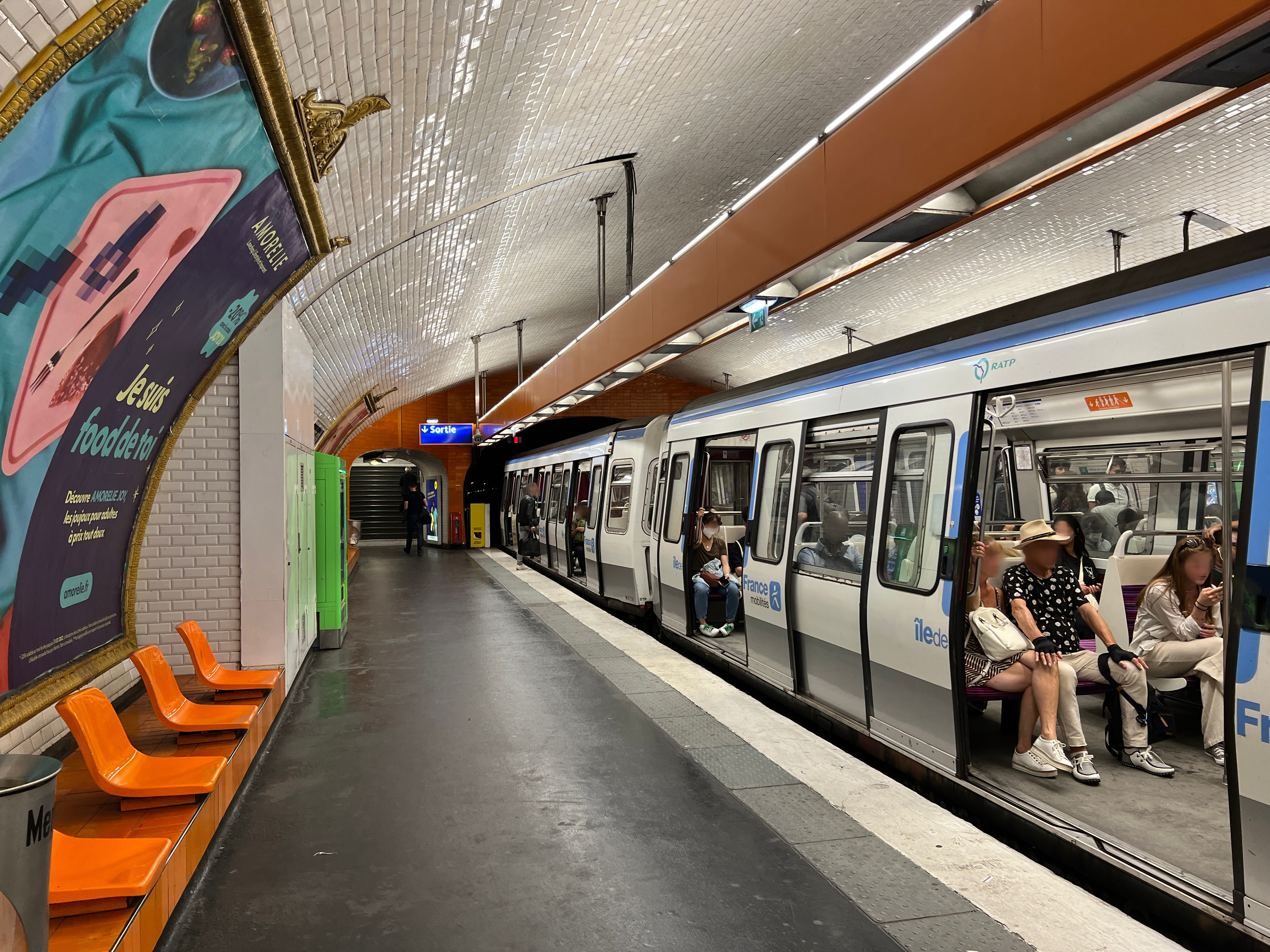
- Station view

General information
- Location: 1st arrondissement of Paris; Île-de-France; France
- Coordinates: 48°51′31″N 2°20′29″E
- System: Paris Métro station
- Owner: RATP
- Operator: RATP

Other information
- Fare zone: 1

History
- Opened: 16 April 1926; 100 years ago

Services
Preceding station	Paris Metro	Following station
Châtelet towards Villejuif–Louis Aragon or Mairie d'Ivry	Line 7	Palais Royal–Musée du Louvre towards La Courneuve–8 mai 1945
Location
- Location within Paris

Pont Neuf (French pronunciation: [pɔ̃ nœf]) is a station on Line 7 of the Paris Métro. Located in the heart of old Paris, it is connected to the Île de la Cité by the nearby Pont Neuf after which it is named. It opened in 1926 with the line's extension from Palais Royal–Musée du Louvre to Pont Marie.

== Location ==
The station is located under the start of the Quai du Louvre, on the right bank of the Seine, at the level of the Pont Neuf. Oriented roughly along an east/west axis, it is located between the Palais-Royal - Musée du Louvre and Châtelet metro stations.

== History ==
The station was opened on 16 April 1926 with the commissioning of the extension of line 7 from Palais-Royal (now Palais-Royal - Musée du Louvre) to Pont Marie. It owes its name to the Pont Neuf, to the north of which it is established and which, despite its name, is the oldest existing bridge in Paris. Built at the end of the sixteenth century and completed in the early seventeenth century, it was then a revolutionary bridge, hence its name, being the first without houses and equipped with sidewalks protecting pedestrians from mud and the passage of horses.

The station bears as a subtitle La Monnaie, because of its immediate proximity to the Rue de la Monnaie, where the Hôtel de la Monnaie was located before its reconstruction in 1776 on the left bank of the Seine at 11 Quai de Conti. The current building, which gave its name to the Monnaie district (6th arrondissement), houses the Monnaie de Paris as well as the Musée de la Monnaie (renamed The Musée du 11 Conti since its reopening in 2017).

The station is with Ledru-Rollin on line 8 and Voltaire on line 9 one of the three stopping points chosen as prototypes of the decorative style Andreu-Motte, which was tested there in 1974. It is the model of those of orange colour. As part of RATP's Renouveau du métro renovation programme, its corridors were renovated on 18 August 2004.

Since 2005 and the closure of the La Samaritaine department store for long renovation and reconstruction works, the number of visitors to the metro station has decreased from 1.68 million admissions, before the closure (from September 2004 to June 2005), to 1.32 million admissions, after it (from September 2005 to June 2006).

In 2020, with the Covid-19 crisis, 605,030 passengers entered this station, which places it in the 283rd position out of 304 metro stations for its attendance.

== Passenger services ==
=== Access ===
The station has three accesses, each consisting of a fixed staircase with a Dervaux-type balustrade:

- access 1 - Rue de la Monnaie, decorated with a Dervaux candelabrum, leading to the Quai du Louvre at the corner with Rue de la Monnaie, opposite the department store La Samaritaine;
- access 2 - Quai du Louvre located opposite the previous one on the said quay, on the Seine side at the corner with the Pont Neuf;
- access 3 - Pont Neuf, also decorated with a Dervaux mast, located at the same angle in the immediate vicinity of access 2.

=== Station layout ===
Street Level

B1	Connecting level

Line 7 platforms	Side platform, doors will open on the right
Line 7 platforms	Southbound	← toward Villejuif–Louis Aragon or Mairie d'Ivry (Châtelet)
Line 7 platforms	Northbound	toward La Courneuve–8 mai 1945 (Palais Royal–Musée du Louvre) →
Line 7 platforms	Side platform, doors will open on the right

=== Platforms ===
Pont-Neuf is a station with a standard configuration. It has two platforms separated by the metro tracks and the vault is elliptical. The decoration is in the Andreu-Motte style with two orange light strips. The benches and tunnel exits are covered in flat orange tiles as well as Motte seats in the same colour. The bevelled white ceramic tiles cover the side walls, the vault and the outlets of the corridors, at the eastern end. The advertising frames are in earthenware in a honey colour and the name of the station is also in earthenware in the style of the original CMP. This decoration is complemented by a cultural arrangement on the theme of the Monnaie de Paris. In the centre of the platforms are presented reproductions of different coins of large dimensions. These representations begin on one side of the platform and reach the other via the vault. The platforms also include an old monetary pendulum as well as two showcases displaying real coins.

=== Bus connections ===
The station is served by lines 21, 27, 58, 67, 69, 70, 72, 74 and 85 of the RATP Bus Network and, at night, by lines N11, N15, N16 and N24 of the Noctilien network.

== Nearby ==
- the Pont Neuf, the oldest bridge in Paris, opened in 1607, although much renovated over the years
- La Samaritaine department store
- the Conciergerie, a former prison where much of the Reign of Terror was carried out during the French Revolution
- Bibliothèque Mazarine
