= Pyramides station =

Paris Métro station

Pyramides
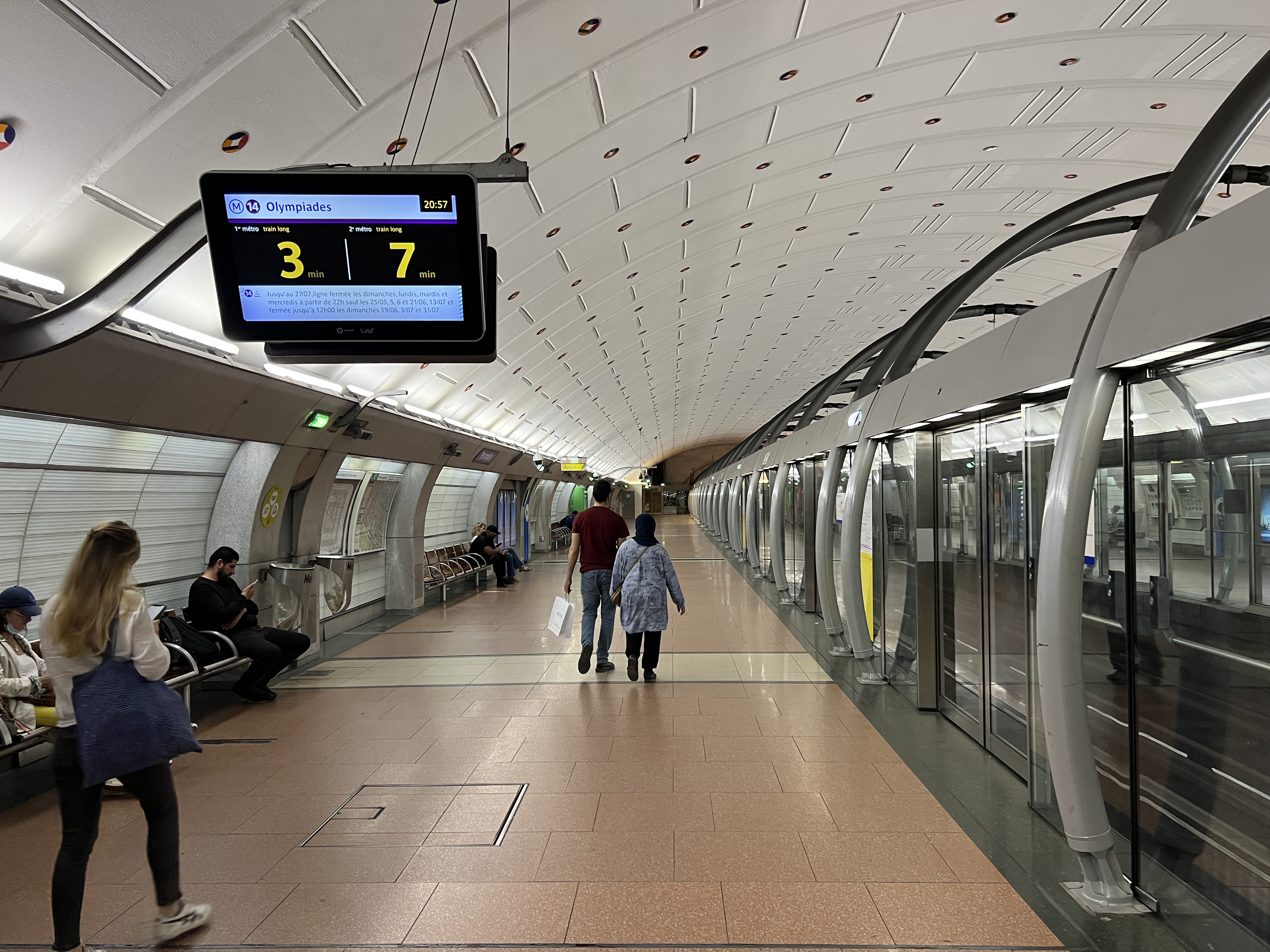
- Line 14 platforms, June 2022

General information
- Location: 1st arrondissement of Paris; Île-de-France; France
- Coordinates: 48°51′57″N 2°20′05″E
- Owner: RATP

Construction
- Accessible: Line 7: No; Line 14: Yes

Other information
- Fare zone: 1

History
- Opened: 1 July 1916; 110 years ago

Services
Preceding station	Paris Metro	Following station
Palais Royal–Musée du Louvre towards Villejuif–Louis Aragon or Mairie d'Ivry	Line 7	Opéra towards La Courneuve–8 mai 1945
Madeleine towards Saint-Denis–Pleyel	Line 14	Châtelet towards Aéroport d'Orly
Location
- Location within Paris

Pyramides station (French pronunciation: [piʁamid]) is a station on lines 7 and 14 of the Paris Métro.

== Location ==
The Pyramides metro station is located halfway between the Palais Garnier and the Comédie-Française theatre. The line passes under Avenue de l'Opéra and under the tunnel of line 7.

== History ==
The station was opened on 1 July 1916 during the extension of line 7 from Opéra to Palais-Royal. Due to the shortage of earthenware linked to the First World War, the station was temporarily equipped with a simple masonry coating.

In the 1990s, the secondary station became a transfer station as part of the Line 14 project. A new connection hall was set up on the south side, above the tracks of line 7. The station for line 14 opened with the rest of the line on 15 October 1998.

It is named after the Rue des Pyramides, which commemorates the victory in 1798 of Napoleon's Armée d'Orient over the Mamluks of Murad Bey in the Battle of the Pyramids in Egypt.

In 2020, with the COVID-19 crisis, 3,048,580 passengers entered this station, which places it in 55th position among metro stations for its attendance.

== Passenger services ==
=== Access ===
- Access 1 - Avenue de l'Opéra, a staircase;
- Access 2 - Rue de l'Échelle, a staircase and an elevator;
- Access 3 - Rue des Pyramides, a staircase.

=== Station layout ===
G	Street Level	Exit/Entrance
B1	Mezzanine	to Exits/Entrances
B2	Side platform, doors will open on the right
B2	Southbound	← toward Villejuif–Louis Aragon or Mairie d'Ivry (Palais Royal–Musée du Louvre)
B2	Northbound	toward La Courneuve–8 mai 1945 (Opéra) →
B2	Side platform, doors will open on the right
B3	Side platform with PSDs, doors will open on the right
B3	Northbound	← toward Saint-Denis–Pleyel (Madeleine)
B3	Southbound	toward Aéroport d'Orly (Châtelet) →
B3	Side platform with PSDs, doors will open on the right

=== Platforms ===
The platforms of line 7 are of standard configuration. Two in number, they are separated by the tracks located in the centre, and the vault is elliptical. They are equipped with benches made of slats. Lighting is provided by two tube strips. The vault is covered with flat white tiling and the advertising frames are made of cylindrical white ceramic of the Ouï-dire type. The name of the station is inscribed on enamel plates in Parisine font.

The platforms of line 14 are also of standard configuration. The fittings are those specific to this line. The vault is equipped with a work by the French artist Jacques Tissinier created at the same time as the station: Tissignalisation no. 14. This is an installation using a thousand embedded discs in coloured enamelled steel. Each disc measures 16 cm in diameter and represents a stylized papyrus sheet coloured in red, white, blue and orange. The same work is present at the Madeleine station on the same line.

=== Bus connections ===
The station is served by lines 21, 27, 68 and 95 of the RATP Bus Network.

== Gallery ==
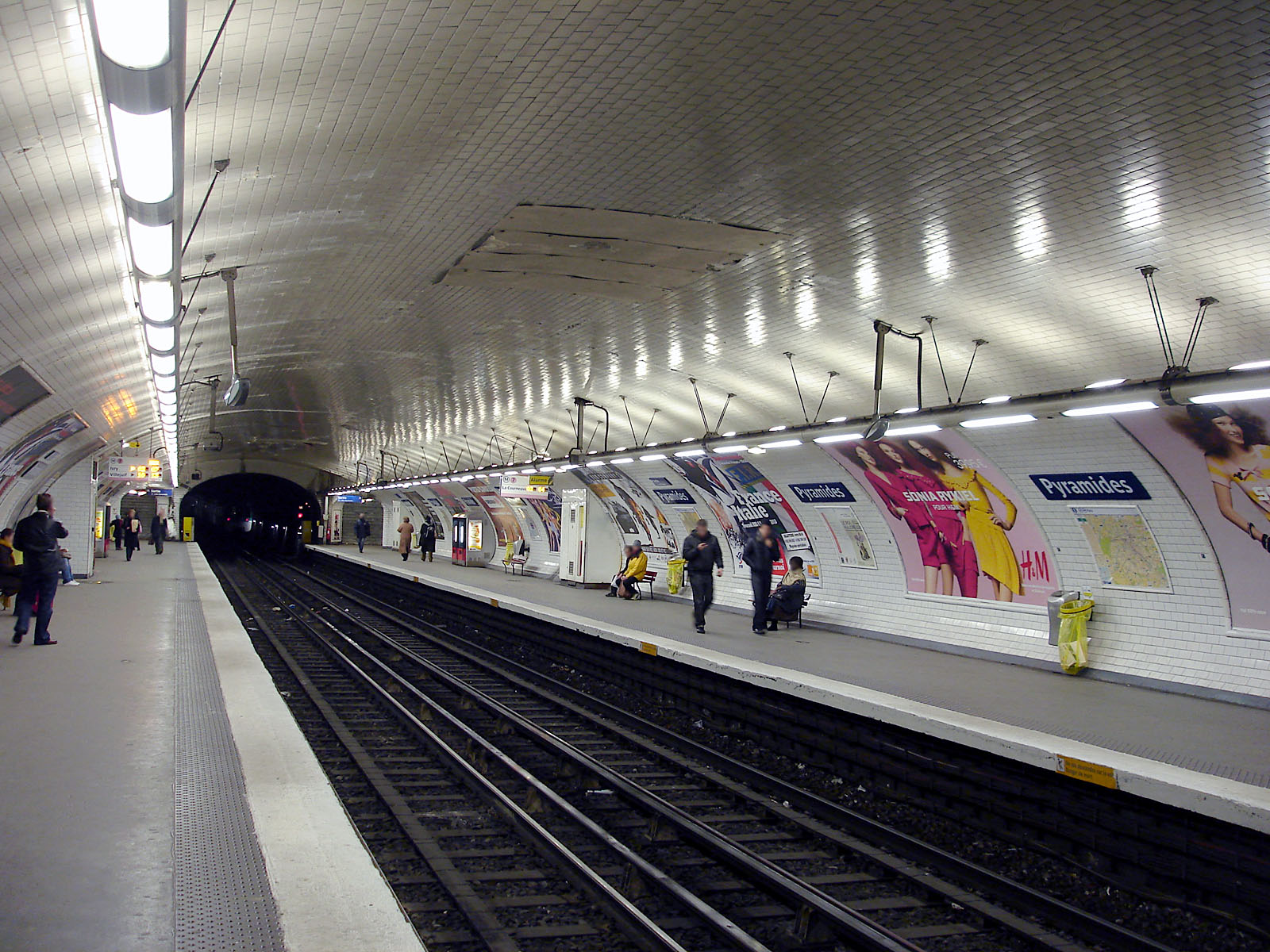
Line 7 platforms

Line 14 platforms from a higher angle

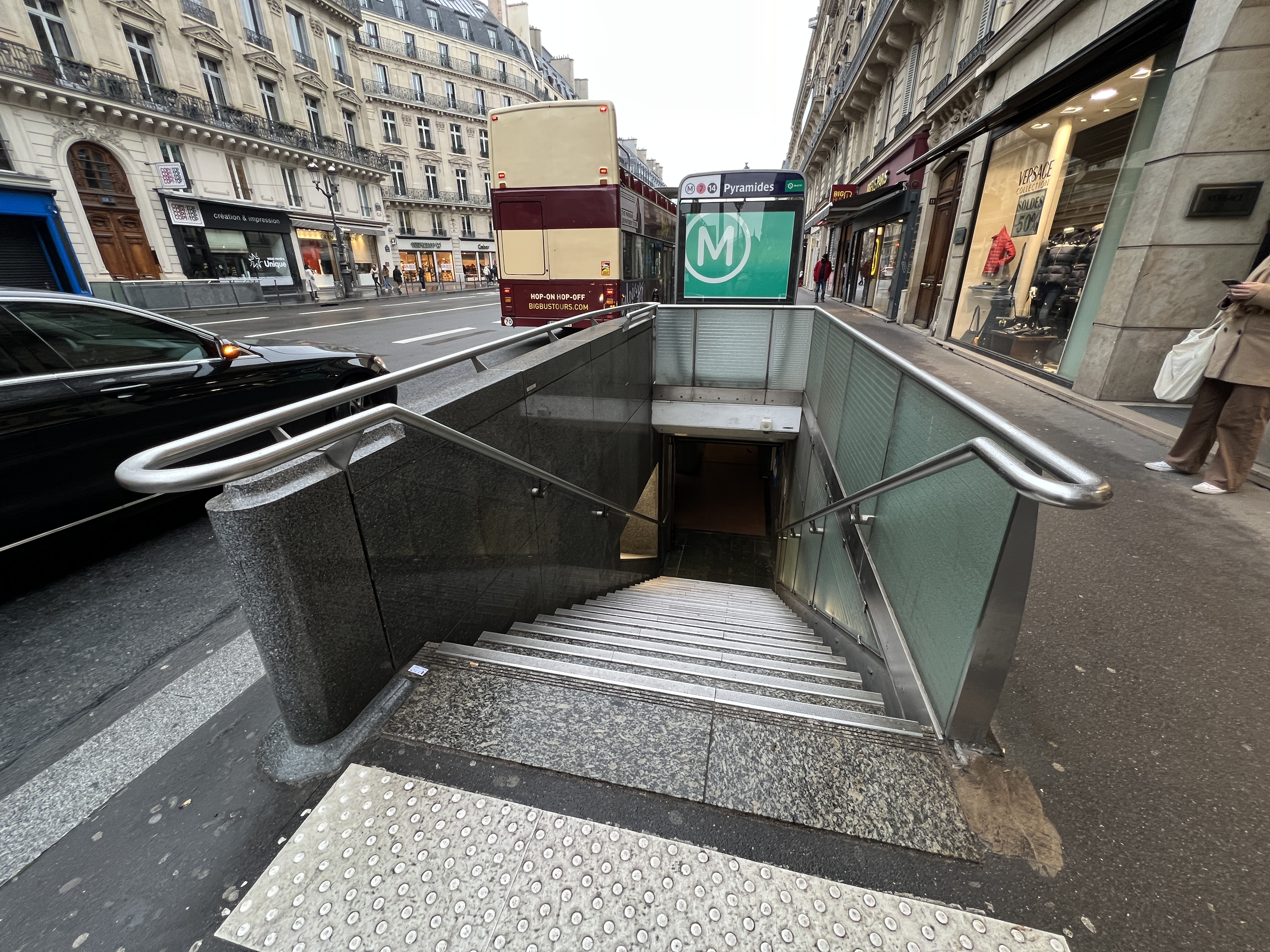
An entrance on Avenue de l'Opéra
