= Louvre–Rivoli station =

Metro station in Paris, France

Louvre–Rivoli
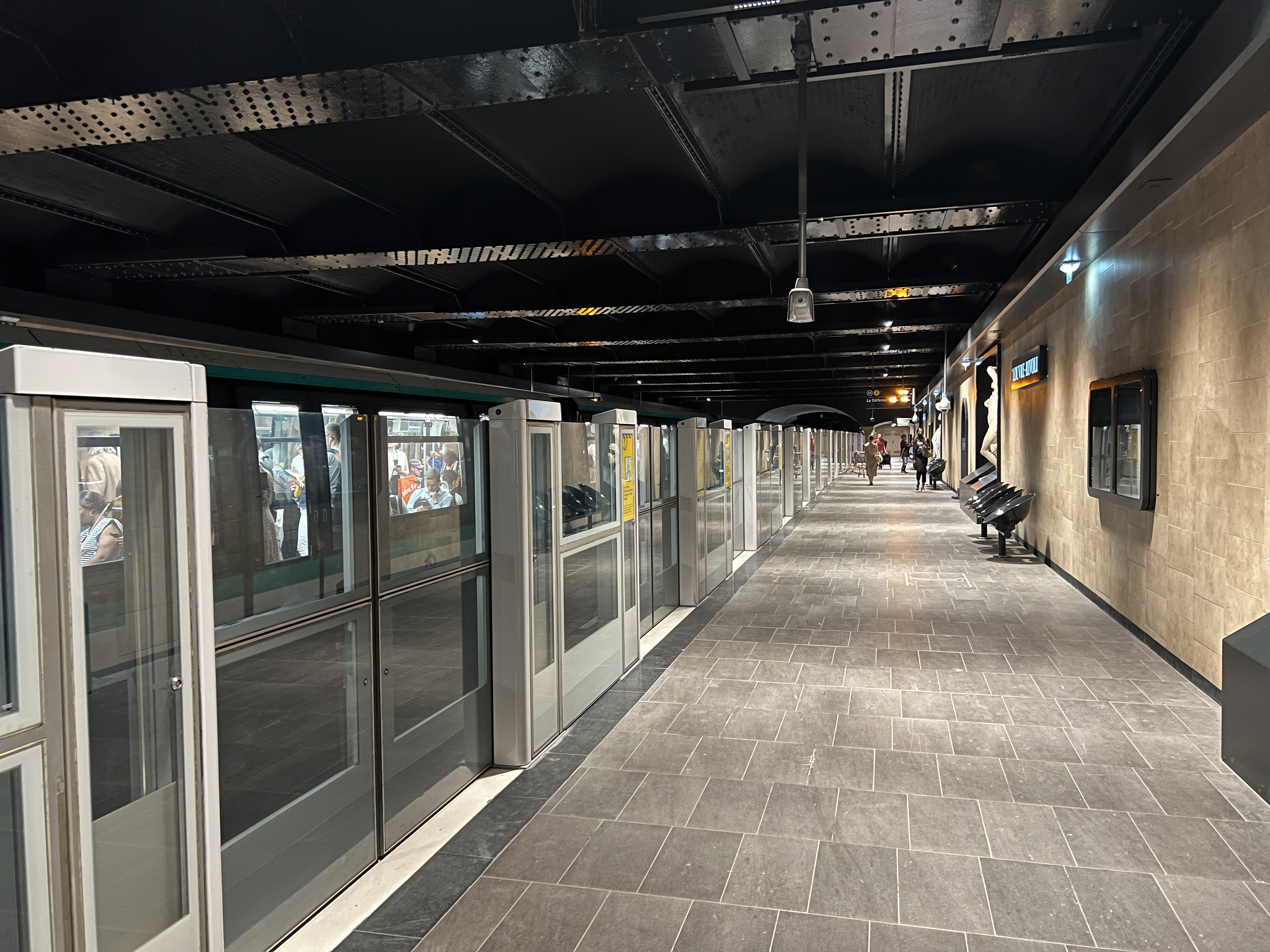
- Louvre–Rivoli in June 2022

General information
- Location: 8, Rue de l'Amiral de Coligny; 1st arrondissement of Paris; Île-de-France; France
- Coordinates: 48°51′40″N 2°20′25″E
- Owner: RATP
- Operator: RATP

Other information
- Fare zone: 1

History
- Opened: 19 July 1900; 126 years ago
- Former names: Louvre (1900–1989)

Services
Preceding station	Paris Metro	Following station
Palais Royal–Musée du Louvre towards La Défense	Line 1	Châtelet towards Château de Vincennes
Route map
Location
- Location within Paris

Louvre–Rivoli (French pronunciation: [luvʁ ʁivɔli]) is a station on the Line 1 of the Paris Metro. Located in the 1st arrondissement, it is near the Louvre and Rue de Rivoli.

== Location ==
The station is located under Rue de Rivoli, west of its intersection with Rue du Louvre. Approximately oriented east–west, it is inserted between the Palais Royal–Musée du Louvre and Châtelet metro stations.

== History ==
The station was opened on 13 August 1900, almost a month after trains began running on the original section of Line 1 between Porte de Vincennes and Porte Maillot on 19 July 1900, under the name Louvre. It was given its current name in 1989, soon after the opening of the new entrance to the Louvre Museum at the simultaneously renamed Palais Royal–Musée du Louvre station.

Because of this proximity, a specific cultural decoration was put in place in September 1968, at the initiative of André Malraux, then Minister of Culture, in order to transform the station into an antechamber of the museum. On the platforms, copies of works of art from the Louvre museum are exhibited, while under the crypt were a historical plan of the Louvre castle and reproductions of old engravings from the palace. The platforms, devoid of advertising, are covered with Burgundy stone tiles, and the metal deck has a false ceiling above the platform. This layout is completed with backlit panels indicating the name of the station according to a specific typography, as well as glass benches available to travelers.

However, with the renovation of the museum carried out in 1989 and the relocation of its entrance in 1990 under the cour d'honneur via the Pyramid, led to the relocating the access by the metro to the Palais Royal station, renamed in 1989 Palais Royal–Louvre Museum. At the same time, the Louvre station became Louvre–Rivoli in order to highlight its service to the Rue de Rivoli, whose name commemorates a victory won by Napoleon Bonaparte over Austria in 1797.

On 1 May 1991, the station was vandalized in a spectacular manner by a group of taggers seeking thereby, to force the entry of their discipline into the institution represented by the Louvre. Unpublished media coverage ensued, making this action a famous stage in the development of graffiti in Paris.

As part of the automation of line 1, the station platforms were raised during the weekend of 21 and 22 February 2009 to accommodate platform doors, which were installed in 2010.

At the same time as the start of this full automation, the reproductions of works were withdrawn in 2011 with a view to renovating the station, operated by RATP as part of the Un métro + beau program. Only the luminous name panels remain. In May 2013, however, posters indicated that the decoration was still in progress; in March 2014, the wall tiles were destroyed, revealing the original flat white earthenware tiles which were part of the experimental decorations tested in 1900 before the bevelled white tiles were subsequently chosen.

The work aimed to improve reception, comfort and safety, as well as the museum scenography, designed in partnership with the Louvre museum. The modernization includes, among other things, the replacement of the wall tiles with facings that are easier to maintain, new seats replacing the glass seats in order to meet safety and accessibility standards, the elimination of the original false ceiling and the installation of a new lighting system. The station reopened its doors on 26 November 2015 after twelve weeks of redevelopment work that required its closure to the public.

On 24 March 2016, the cultural facilities including nine casts exhibited on the platforms were unveiled. The redevelopment of the station further includes a specific SIEL display device.

In 2019, according to RATP estimates, the station's annual attendance was 2,633,369, which placed it in 198th position among metro stations for its attendance out of 302.

== Passenger services ==
=== Access ===
The station has a single entrance called Rue de l'Amiral-de-Coligny, leading to the right of no. 8 in the street via a fixed staircase at the intersection of Rue du Louvre and Rue de Rivoli. It is decorated with a Guimard entrance, which is listed as a historic monument by the decree of 12 February 2016.

=== Station layout ===
Street Level

B1	Connecting level

Line 1 platforms	Side platform with PSDs, doors will open on the right
Line 1 platforms	Westbound	← toward La Défense–Grande Arche (Palais Royal–Musée du Louvre)
Line 1 platforms	Eastbound	toward Château de Vincennes (Châtelet) →
Line 1 platforms	Side platform with PSDs, doors will open on the right

=== Platform ===
Louvre–Rivoli is a standard configuration station. It has two platforms separated by the metro tracks. Established flush with the wall, it has a metal ceiling whose beams are supported by vertical piers. A 15-meter-long crypt, the ceiling of which rests on closely spaced pillars, extends it to its western end since the introduction of the six-car train line in the 1960s.

The decoration is cultural and designed as an antechamber to the Louvre. Developed in partnership with the latter, it showcases reproductions of statues from Antiquity or the Middle Ages, displayed directly on the platforms. Porcelain stoneware wall claddings cover the walls, devoid of advertising, while the floor and tunnel exits are tiled in anthracite gray, the crypt painted white. The backs of the display cases, the alcoves and the pedestals are covered with a dark material to simulate a case, and the ceiling is painted entirely in black. The lighting is provided by spotlights oriented towards the walls, and the name of the station appears on backlit panels, in white capital letters on a black background, in a specific serif typeface. The platforms are equipped with black Akiko seats and have platform screen doors.

=== Bus connections ===
The station is served by lines 21, 67, 69, 72, 74 and 85 of the RATP Bus Network. At night, it is served by lines N11, N15, N16 and N24 of the Noctilien network.

== Nearby ==
- Pont des Arts
- Poste centrale du Louvre (post office)
- Mairie du 1er arrondissement de Paris (town hall)
- Saint-Germain l'Auxerrois Church

== Gallery ==
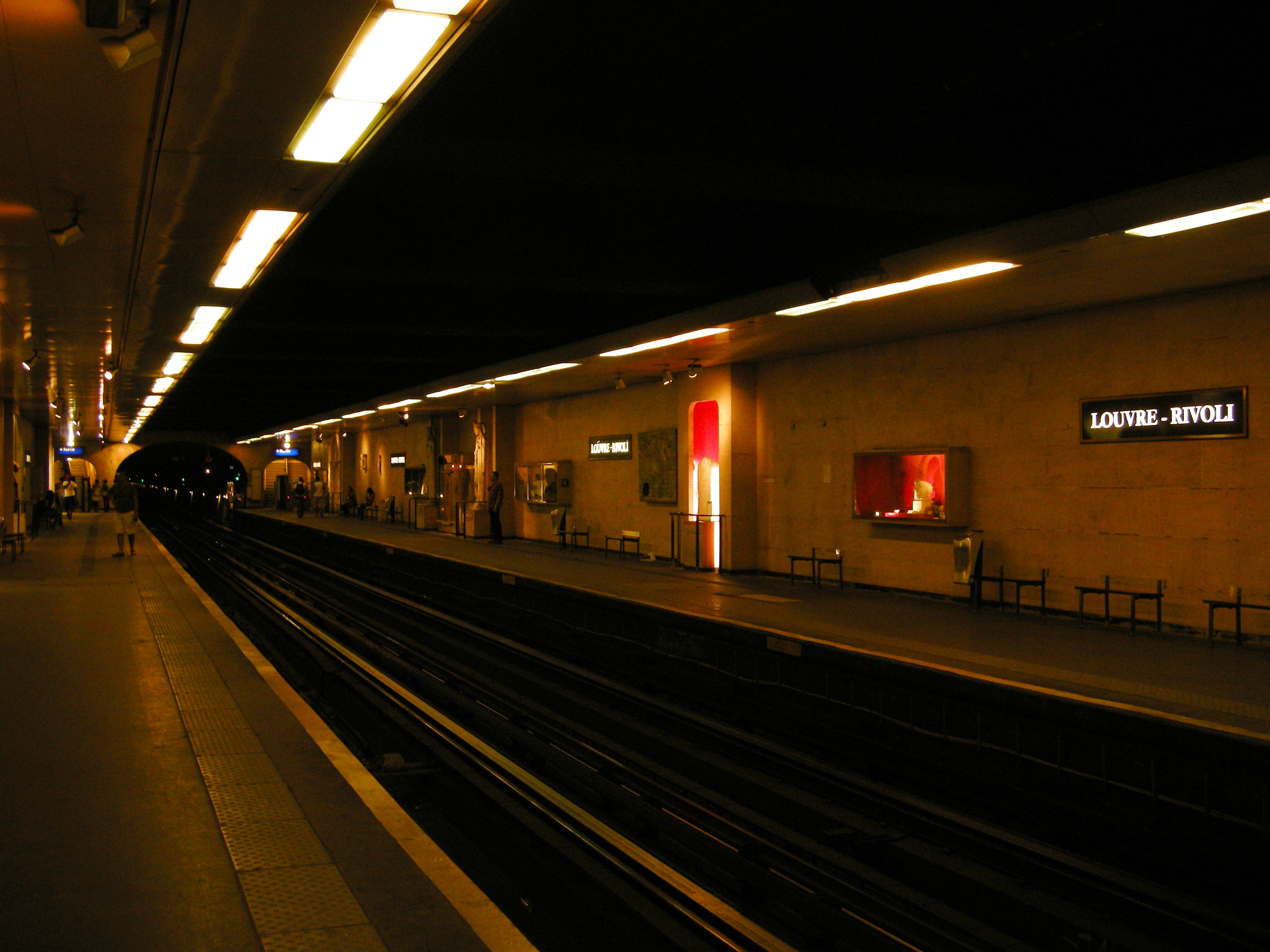
Louvre–Rivoli platforms in 2009, prior to automation and the installation of screen doors

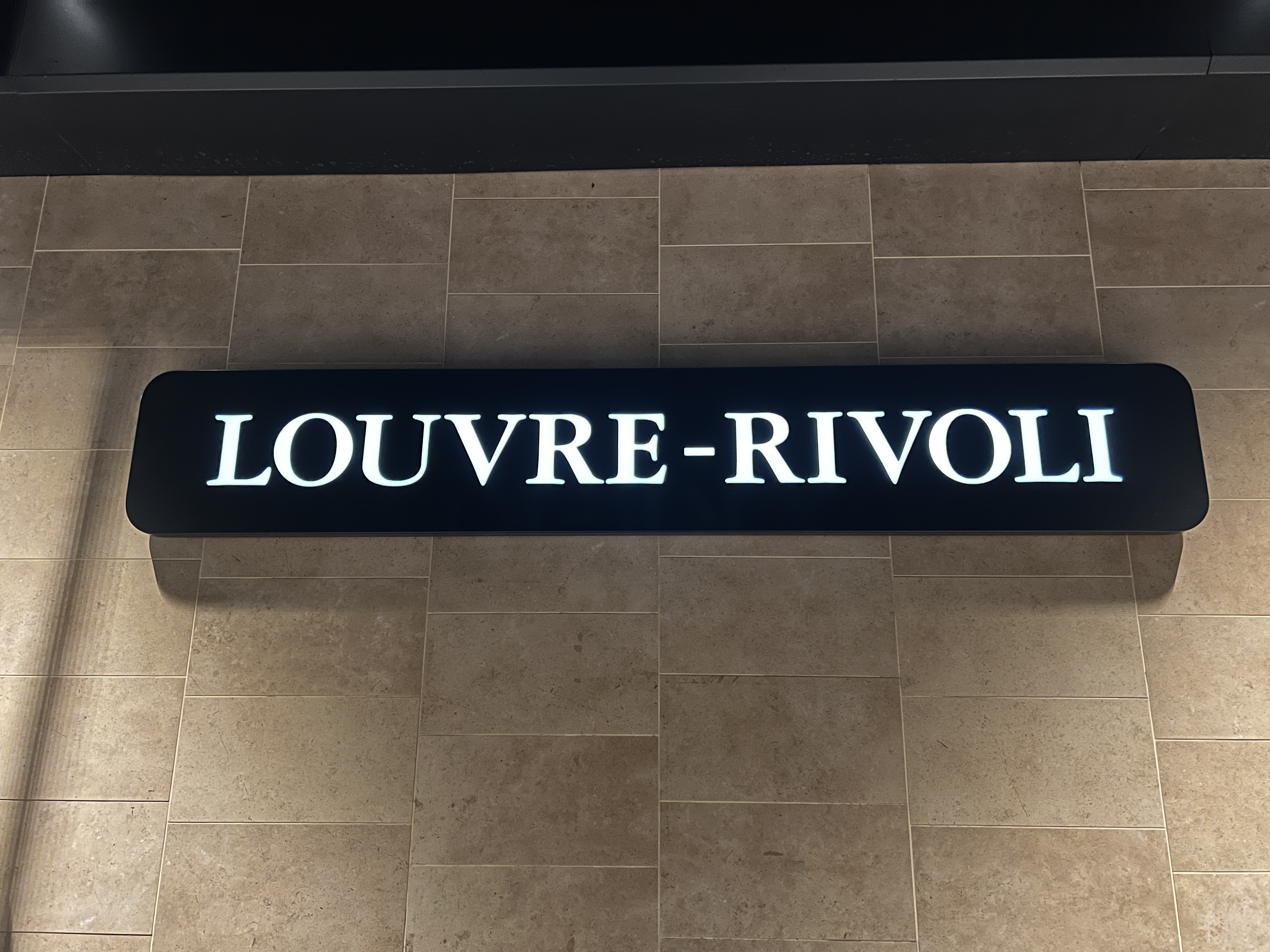
Louvre–Rivoli signage

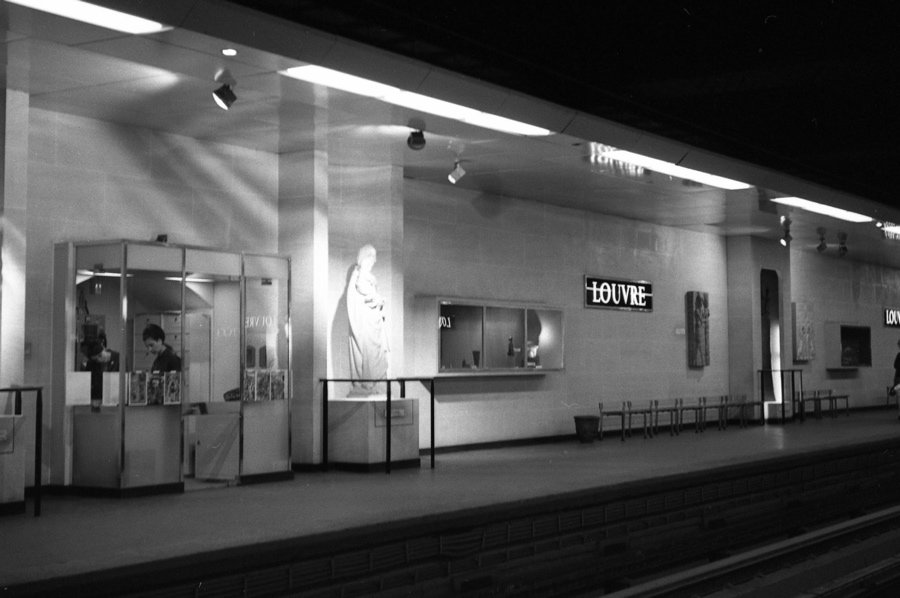
The station in 1970, then known simply as Louvre
