= Pont Marie station =

Metro station in Paris, France

Pont Marie
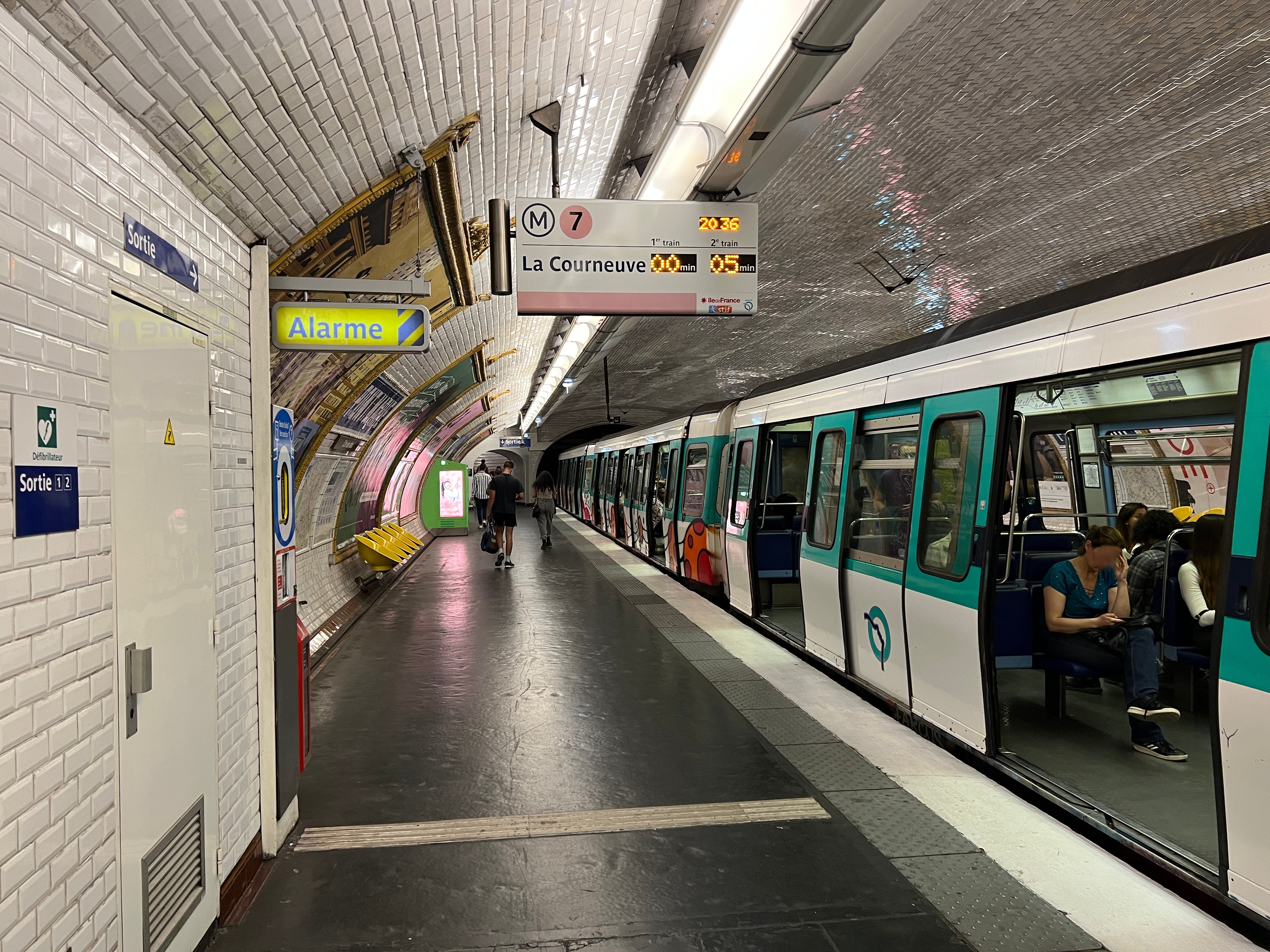
- Platforms view

General information
- Location: 4th arrondissement of Paris; Île-de-France; France
- Coordinates: 48°51′12″N 2°21′27″E
- System: Paris Métro station
- Owner: RATP
- Operator: RATP

Other information
- Fare zone: 1

History
- Opened: 16 April 1926; 100 years ago

Services
Preceding station	Paris Metro	Following station
Sully–Morland towards Villejuif–Louis Aragon or Mairie d'Ivry	Line 7	Châtelet towards La Courneuve–8 mai 1945
Location
- Location within Paris

Pont Marie (French pronunciation: [pɔ̃ maʁi]) is a station of the Paris Métro opened in 1926 with the extension of Line 7 from Palais Royal–Musée du Louvre. It is named after the nearby bridge over the Seine, the Pont Marie, which connects to Île Saint-Louis.

== Location ==
The station is located on the banks of the Seine, on the Quai de l'Hôtel-de-Ville, near the Place du Bataillon-Français-de-l'ONU-en-Korea, west of the Pont Marie and the Rue des Nonnains-d'Hyères. Oriented along an east-west axis, it is located between the Châtelet and Sully-Morland stations.

== History ==
The station opened on April 16, 1926. It was until 3 June 1930, the southern terminus of line 7 from Porte de la Villette and Pré-Saint-Gervais, replacing the previous terminus at Palais Royal (now Palais Royal–Musée du Louvre station), when the line was extended with an additional station at Pont Sully (which soon became Sully - Morland).

It takes its name from its proximity to the Marie Bridge, built in 1614 on the initiative of the engineer-entrepreneur Christophe Marie, who gave it its name.

The subtitle of the station is Cité des Arts because of its proximity to one of the two sites of the Cité internationale des arts, an artistic residence inaugurated in 1965, welcoming artists of all specialties and nationalities.

As part of the RATP's "Metro Renewal" programme, the station's corridors and platform lighting were renovated and inaugurated on 25 March 2008.

In 2021, 1,101,482 passengers entering this station, which placed it in 275th position among metro stations for ridership out of 304.

== Passenger services ==
=== Access ===
The station has two entrances made up of fixed stairs built back-to-back, each embellished with a Dervaux-type balustrade and leading to the central embankment of the Place du Bataillon-Français-de-l'ONU-en-Korea, opposite the Cité des Arts:

- Access 1 - Quai de l'Hôtel-de-Ville, adorned with a Dervaux candelabra, located at 18 Rue de l'Hôtel-de-Ville;
- Access 2 - Pont Marie - Île Saint-Louis is located slightly further east, to the right of Square Albert-Schweitzer.

=== Station layout ===
Street Level

B1	Connecting level

Line 7 platforms	Side platform, doors will open on the right
Line 7 platforms	Southbound	← toward Villejuif–Louis Aragon or Mairie d'Ivry (Sully–Morland)
Line 7 platforms	Northbound	toward La Courneuve–8 mai 1945 (Châtelet) →
Line 7 platforms	Side platform, doors will open on the right

=== Platform ===
Pont Marie is a standard configuration station. It has two platforms separated by the metro tracks and the vault is elliptical. The decoration is in the style used in most metro stations. The lighting canopies are white and rounded in the Gaudin style of the metro revival of the 2000s, and the bevelled white ceramic tiles cover the walls, the vault, the tunnel exits and the corridor openings. The advertising frames are made of honey-coloured earthenware and the name of the station is also made of earthenware in the style of the original CMP, while the subtitle underneath is inscribed in Parisine font on small, enamelled plates. The Akiko style seats are yellow in colour.

=== Bus connections ===
The station is served by lines 67 and 72 of the RATP Bus Network.

== Nearby ==
- Pont Marie
- Cité internationale des arts
- Mémorial de la Shoah
- Square Albert-Schweitzer
- Hôtel de Sens
- Jardin de l'Hôtel-de-Sens
- Jardin Roger-Priou-Valjean
- Square Marie-Trintignant
- Île Saint-Louis

== Gallery ==
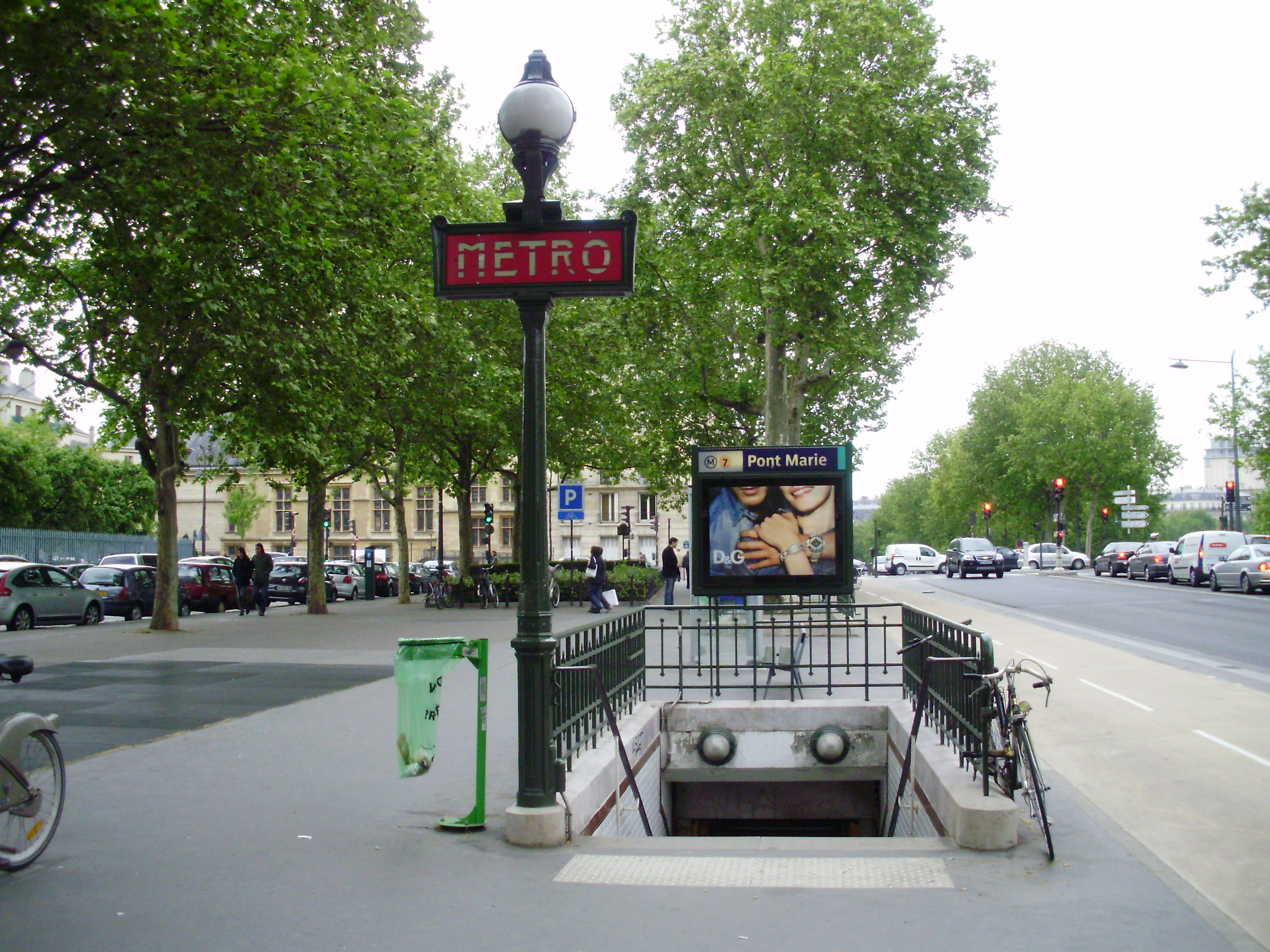
Street-level entrance at Pont Marie

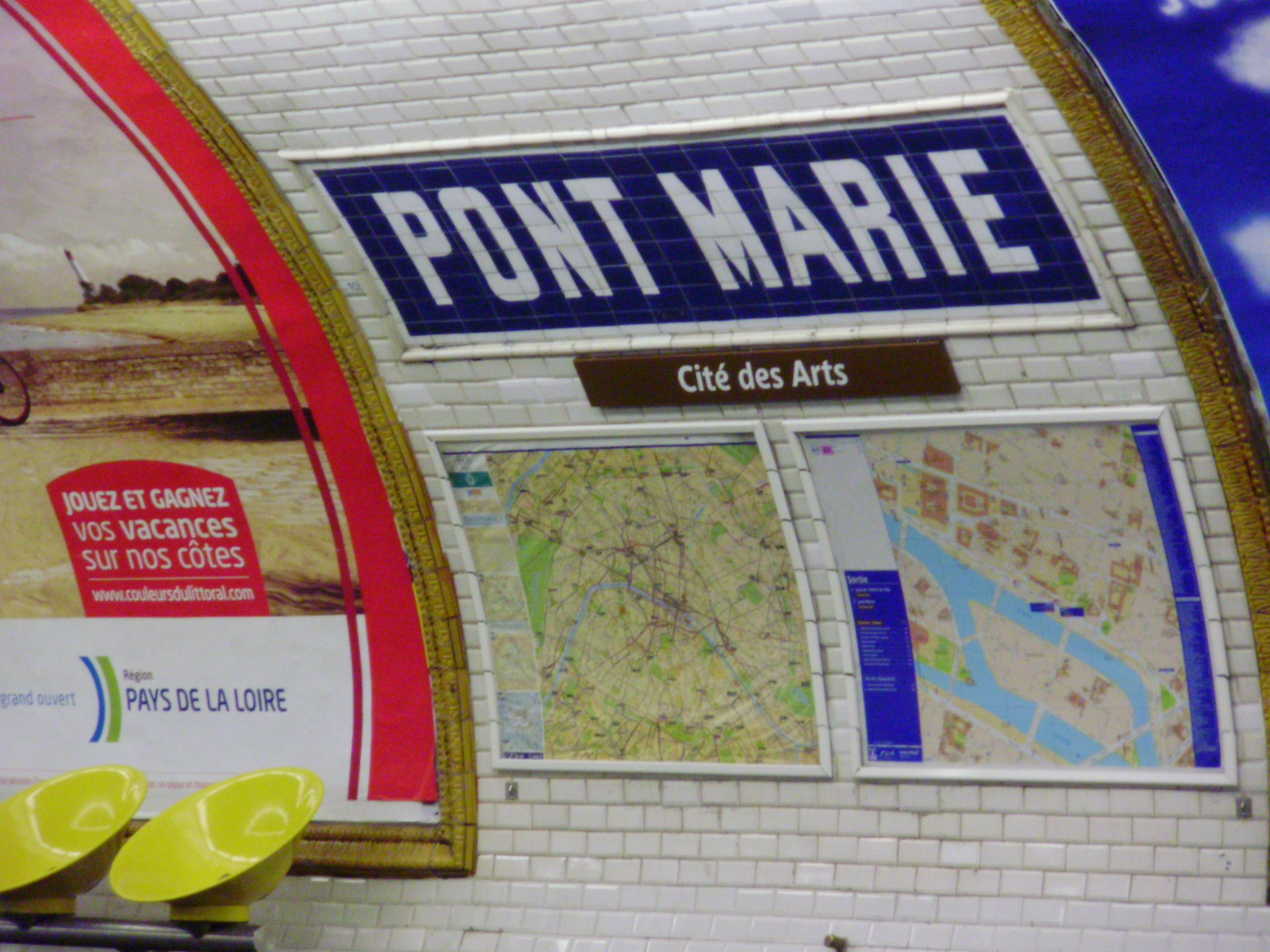
Platform signage at Pont Marie
