= Saint-Michel station (Paris Metro) =

Metro station in Paris, France

Saint-Michel
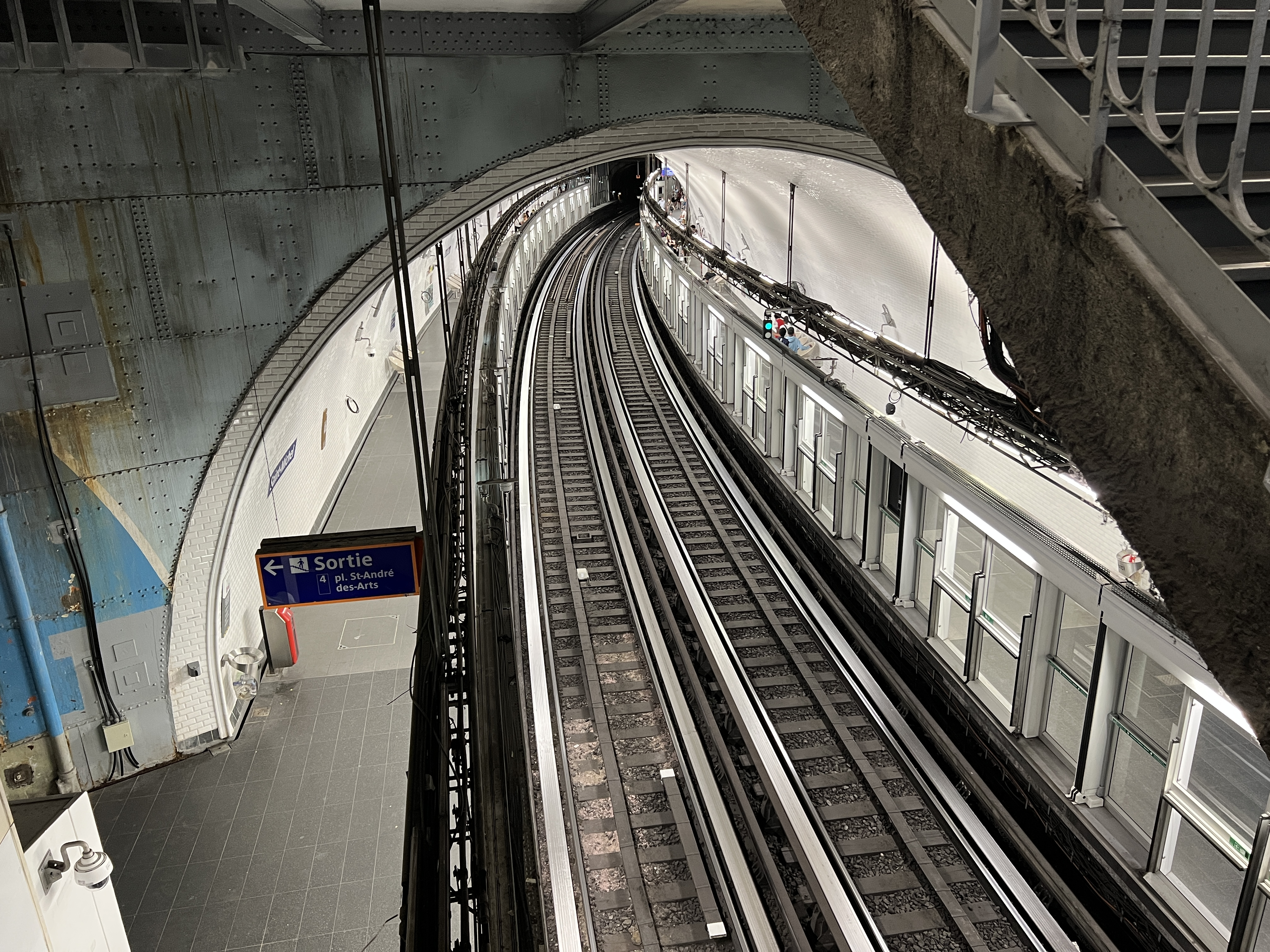
- Line 4 platforms with Platform screen doors

General information
- Location: 9, pl. Saint-Michel; Pl. Saint-Michel × boul. Saint-Michel pl. Saint-Michel × quai Saint-Michel; 15, pl. Saint-André des Arts; 5th arrondissement of Paris; Île-de-France; France
- Coordinates: 48°51′13″N 2°20′38″E
- Owner: RATP
- Operator: RATP

Construction
- Accessible: Yes

Other information
- Fare zone: 1

History
- Opened: 9 January 1910

Services
| Preceding station | Paris Metro | Following station |
|---|---|---|
| Odéon towards Bagneux–Lucie Aubrac | Line 4 | Cité towards Porte de Clignancourt |
Connections to other stations
| Preceding station | RER | Following station |
| Châtelet towards Aéroport Charles de Gaulle 2 TGV or Mitry–Claye | RER B transfer at St-Michel – Notre-Dame | Luxembourg towards Robinson or Saint-Rémy-lès-Chevreuse |
| Musée d'Orsay towards Pontoise, Versailles Château Rive Gauche or Saint-Quentin-en-Yvelines | RER C transfer at St-Michel – Notre-Dame | Gare d'Austerlitz towards Massy-Palaiseau, Dourdan-la-Forêt or Saint-Martin-d'Étampes |
Location
- Location within Paris

Saint-Michel (French pronunciation: [sɛ̃ miʃɛl]) is a station on Line 4 of the Paris Métro in the 5th arrondissement. Located in the Quartier Latin, it offers a connection to the St-Michel - Notre-Dame RER station on RER lines B and C.

The station was opened on 9 January 1910 as part of the connecting section of the line under the Seine between Châtelet and Raspail. It is named after the Boulevard Saint-Michel.

== Architecture ==
Like nearby Cité, Saint-Michel features a pioneering construction technique, made necessary by the proximity of the Seine. The station comprises three steel caissons – one for the train hall and two for access at each end – which were assembled at the surface and then lowered into place.

The platforms are 118 metres long, more than the standard length on the network. This allows it to potentially handle eight-car trains, however, due to the other stations having an average of 100-meter platforms (excluding Cité, which has 110-meter platforms), and the Line's ongoing process for automatic operations, the trains in the Line 4 will be limited to six-car trains.

== Nearby attractions ==
- Île de la Cité
- Île Saint-Louis
- Notre Dame Cathedral

== Station layout ==
| G | Street Level | Exit/Entrance |
| B1 | Mezzanine | to Exits/Entrances, connections to |
| Platform level | Side platform with PSDs doors will open on the right |
| Platform level | Northbound | ← toward Porte de Clignancourt (Cité) |
| Platform level | Southbound | toward Bagneux–Lucie Aubrac (Odéon) → |
| Platform level | Side platform with PSDs doors will open on the right |

== Gallery ==
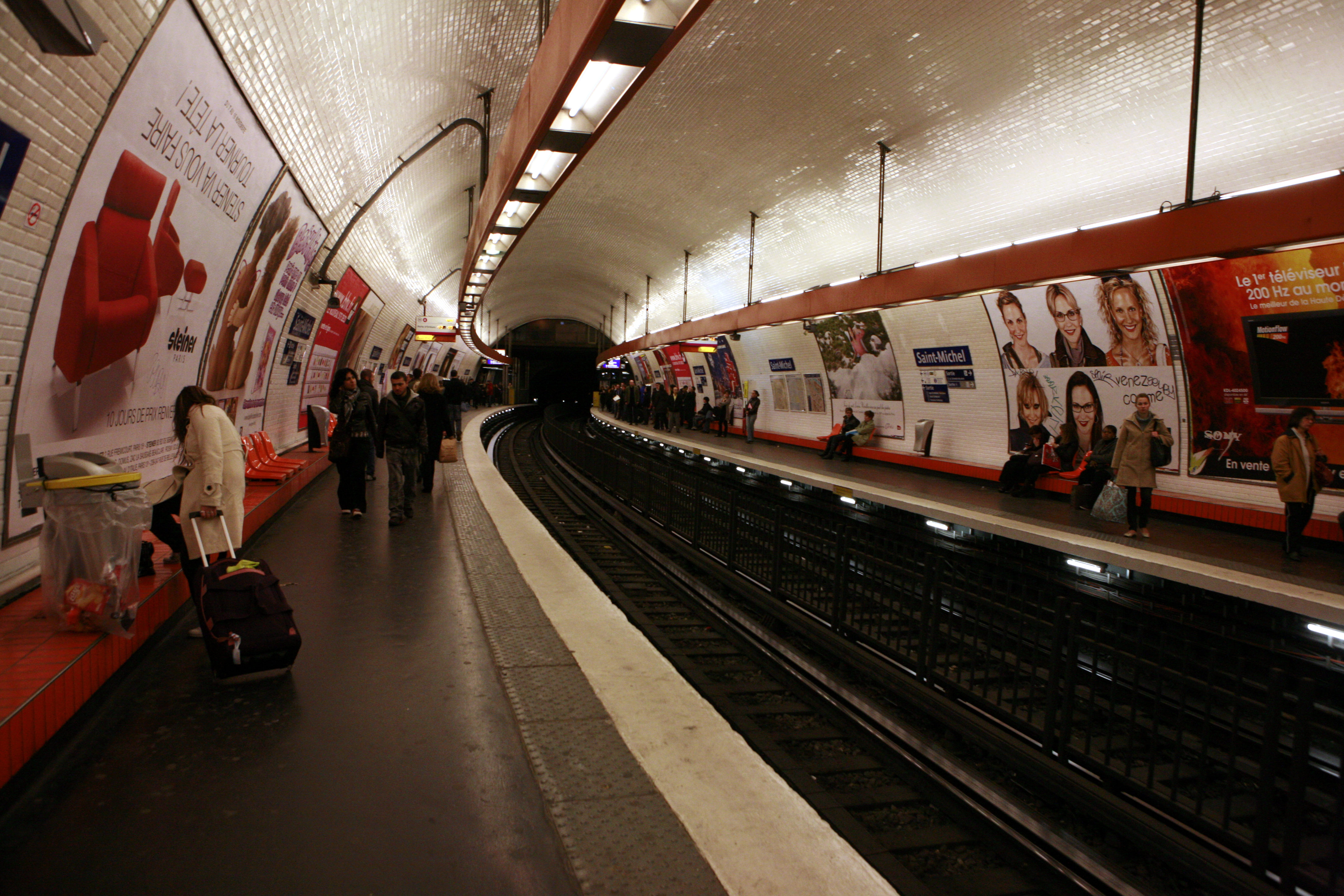
Line 4 platforms at Saint-Michel

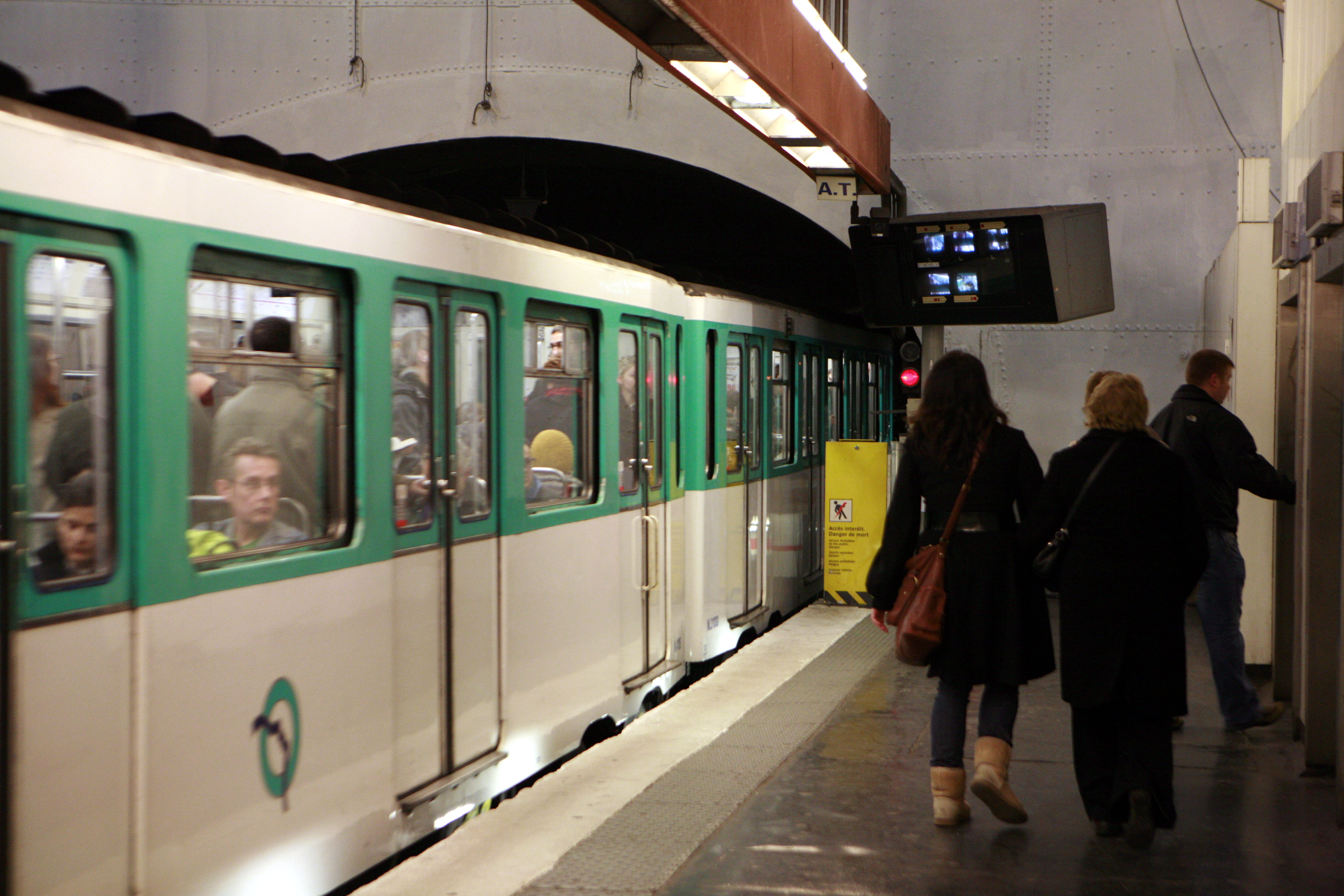
MP 59 rolling stock on Line 4 at Saint-Michel

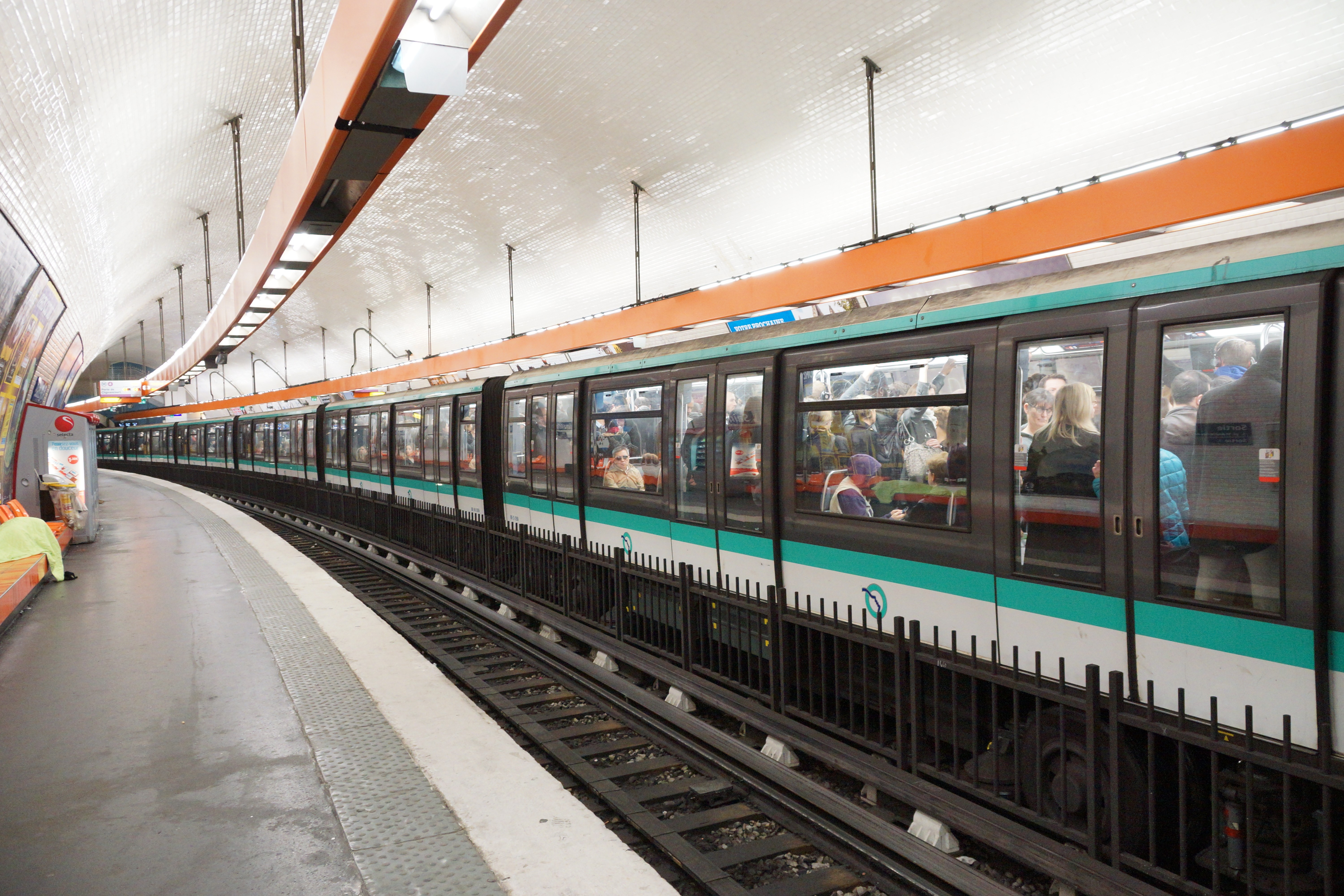
MP 89 rolling stock on Line 4 at Saint-Michel

== See also ==
- St-Michel – Notre-Dame (Paris RER)
