= Paris Metro Line 4 =

Subway route in the French capital

Line 4
- Paris Metro Line 4
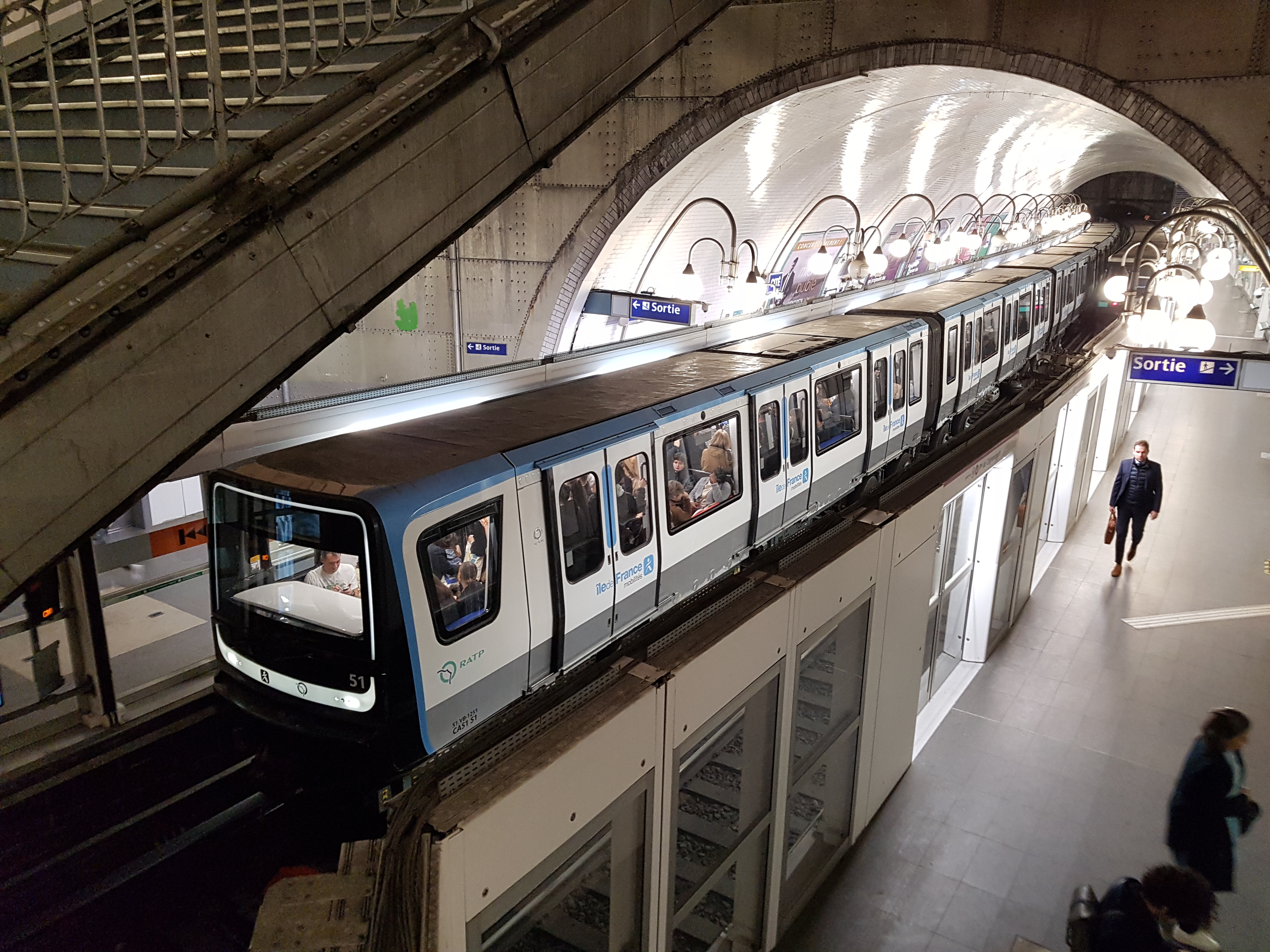
- MP 14 at Cité station.

Overview
- Termini: Porte de Clignancourt; Bagneux-Lucie Aubrac
- Connecting lines: Paris Metro Paris Metro Line 1 Paris Metro Line 2 Paris Metro Line 3 Paris Metro Line 5 Paris Metro Line 6 Paris Metro Line 7 Paris Metro Line 8 Paris Metro Line 9 Paris Metro Line 10 Paris Metro Line 11 Paris Metro Line 12 Paris Metro Line 13 Paris Metro Line 14 RER RER A RER B RER C RER D RER E Transilien Transilien Line H (Paris-Nord) Transilien Line K (Paris-Nord) Transilien Line N (Paris-Montparnasse) Transilien Line P (Paris-Est) Tramways in Île-de-France Île-de-France tramway Line 3a Île-de-France tramway Line 3b
- Stations: 29

Service
- System: Paris Métro
- Operator: RATP
- Rolling stock: MP 89 CA (21 trains as of 5 June 2023); MP 05 (11 trains as of 10 February 2023); MP 14 CA (20 trains as of 18 March 2025)
- Ridership: 167,000,000 (avg. per year); 2nd/16

History
- Opened: 21 April 1908; 118 years ago

Technical
- Line length: 13.9 km (8.6 mi)
- Track gauge: 1,435 mm (4 ft 8 1/2 in) standard gauge between roll ways
- Electrification: 750 V DC, guide bars on either side of the track
- Conduction system: Automated (SAET)

Line 4 (French pronunciation: [liɲᵊ katʁᵊ]) is one of the sixteen currently opened lines of the Paris Métro, as well as one of its three fully automated lines. It connects Porte de Clignancourt in the north of Paris, to Bagneux-Lucie Aubrac in the eponymous southern suburban city, on a north-south axis across the French Capital. Held within the boundaries of the City of Paris for over a century – until its southern terminus was changed from Porte d'Orléans to Mairie de Montrouge in 2013 – the line was sometimes referred to as the Clignancourt – Orléans Line. At 13.9 km (8.6 mi) in length, it connects with all Paris Métro lines apart from the very short 3bis and 7bis branch lines, as well as with all 5 RER train lines. It also serves three of the Paris Railway stations, Gare du Nord, Gare de l'Est, and Gare Montparnasse.

Line 4 was the first line to connect to the south side of the River Seine, through an underwater tunnel built between 1905 and 1907. Line 4 long ran the longest-serving MP 59 rubber trains, which used rheostats to dissipate the braking power through resistance, making line 4 the hottest line in the system. Those trains were withdrawn from service on Line 4 during the course of 2011 and 2012 after 45 years (with some being in service for 50 years), yet remained another 12 years on in service on Line 11. On Line 4, they were replaced by the MP 89 CC stock transferred from Line 1, right after its automation.

In 2013, Line 4 was extended for the first time since its initial construction, into the southern suburbs of Montrouge. The line was further extended to Bagneux–Lucie Aubrac in 2022, connecting to the future Grand Paris Express. The line has been retrofitted for full automation, with the first automated trains commencing service on 12 September 2022.

== History ==
=== Chronology ===
- 21 April 1908: A first section of the line was inaugurated to the north of the Seine between Porte de Clignancourt and Châtelet.
- 30 October 1909: A second section of the line was inaugurated south of the Seine between Porte d'Orléans and Raspail.
- 9 January 1910: Both sections were linked by a new tunnel between Châtelet and Raspail. Line 4 was the first line crossing the Seine river underground.
- 1967: The rails were converted in order to cater for rubber-tired trains. The MP 59 rolling stock replaced the steel-wheeled Sprague-Thomson stock.
- 3 October 1977: The station Les Halles was rebuilt to interchange with the new RER network.
- 23 May 2011: Cascading of MP 59 to MP 89CC rolling stock began.
- 21 December 2012: The last MP 59 (#6021) was withdrawn after 45 years of service on Line 4.
- 23 March 2013: Extension south to Mairie de Montrouge officially opened to passengers, marking the first extension of Line 4 since its inception.
- 2016: Automation work begins.
- 13 January 2022: Extension south to Bagneux-Lucie Aubrac officially opened to passengers.
- 12 September 2022: First automatic trains (MP89, MP05 and MP14) enter service
- 15 December 2023: Last day of driver operated services

=== Origins ===
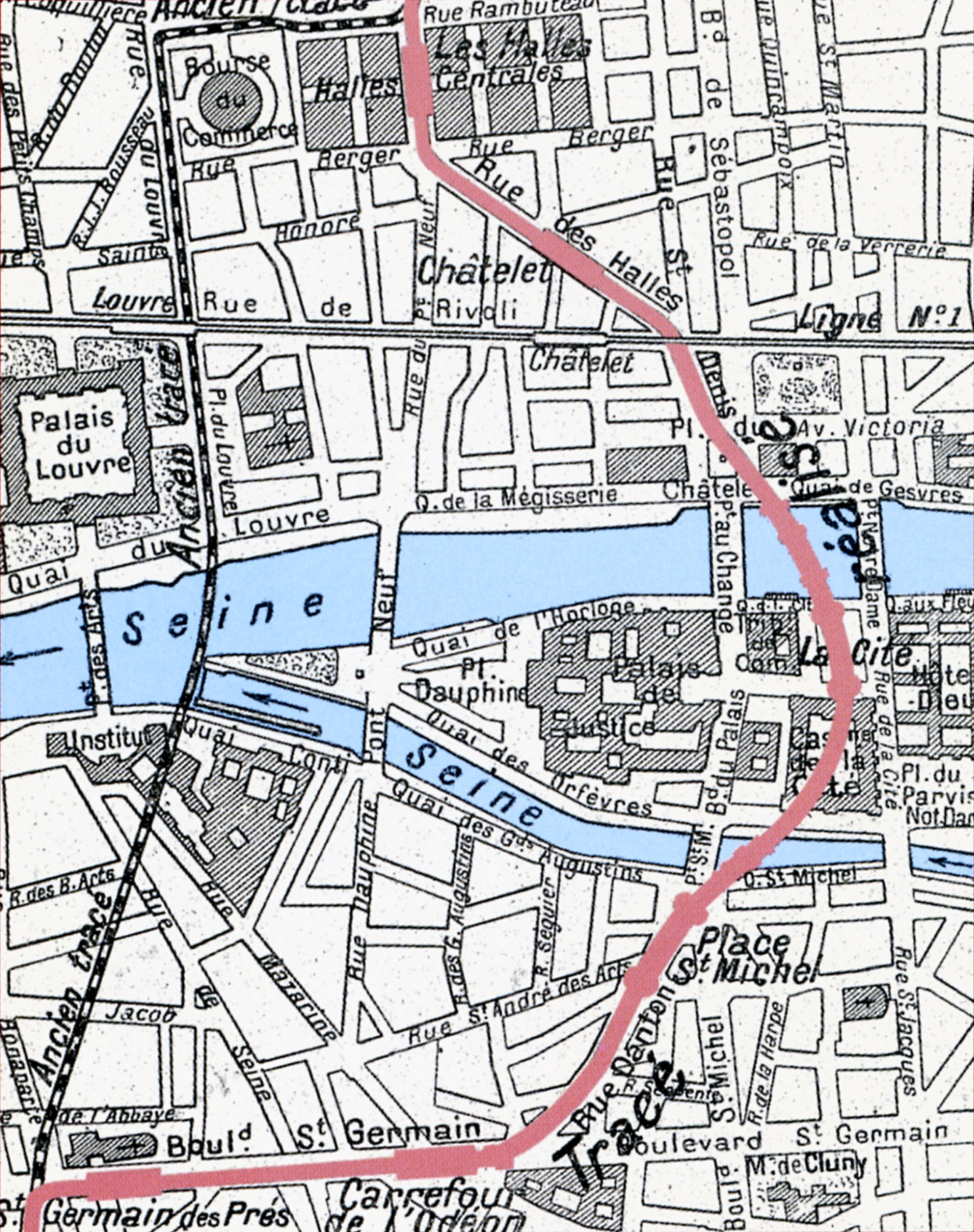
Original abandoned route (black) and built route (red) of Line 4 through the île de la Cité.

Line 4, opened in 1908, was the last line of the original concession of the Compagnie du chemin de fer métropolitain de Paris and the first to cross the Seine underground (Line 5—now Line 6 at this point—crossed the river on the Passy bridge, later renamed the Pont de Bir-Hakeim in 1906). The route was the subject of lengthy discussions that delayed the start of construction of the tunnel. It was originally planned as a straight line under the Rue du Louvre, under the Seine in line with the street, under the Institut de France, along the Rue de Rennes and then the Boulevard Raspail to the Porte d'Orleans.

But as a result of the delay in the extension of the Rue de Rennes as part of Haussmann's plan towards the Seine—which was never carried out—and the outcry from the academicians who refused categorically the line passing under the Institut de France, the route was eventually changed to cross further east through the Place du Châtelet and the Île de la Cité. The new route also has more coherence as a north–south route following the main traffic flows. A second modification of the route was also made: it was decided to make a temporary deviation via the major station of Gare Montparnasse to avoid a further delay in opening the line, which was eagerly awaited. This was made necessary by the delay in building the new Boulevard Raspail between Rue de Rennes and Boulevard du Montparnasse. Once the Boulevard Raspail was completed, it was planned to take the shorter route and bypass the Gare Montparnasse. To the south of the Vavin station the tunnel provides for the final route along the Boulevard Raspail. But the value in serving three major mainline stations by the line later led to the abandonment of this proposal.

=== A spectacular construction site ===
In 1905 construction was started by the company of Léon Chagnaud—a former mason from Creuse (a department with a tradition of supplying building workers in France)—and line 4 became the first to cross the Seine underground. The method used for crossing under the river is that of metal caissons, twenty to forty meters in length mounted on the banks and sunken vertically in the river bed. The ends of the caissons were blocked and they were towed to their location before being ballasted with water and sunk in the riverbed. A chamber filled with pressurised air was built at the lower level of these caissons so that workers could excavate under the caissons. Each caisson gradually sank to its final position as the ground below it was removed. The northern stream of the Seine required three caissons, the southern stream two caissons.

The crossing of the Seine also involved the freezing of saturated ground between the station of Saint-Michel and the Seine, under the line of the Chemin de Fer de Paris à Orléans (now RER line C) in 1908 and 1909. The installation of two refrigeration plants allowed the movement of brine cooled to −25 °C in dozens of tubes to stabilize the ground.

The northern section was the first completed: it was opened on 21 April 1908 from Porte de Clignancourt to Châtelet. The southern section was opened 30 in October 1909 from Porte d'Orleans to Raspail. The two sections were connected on 9 January 1910. However, the line was closed to traffic a few days later in January 1910, when the level of the Seine broke its banks during the worst flood of the century. On the morning of 24 January 1910, a significant inflow of water at the Seine crossing interrupted services between Châtelet and Vavin, although services were restored later in the day. But the inflow increased and services were again halted in the afternoon. On 26 January Châtelet station and the crossing under the river was completely flooded and slowly rose in the tunnel. On the night of 27 and 28 January, flooding reached Réaumur – Sébastopol and eventually Gare de l'Est: The line at its minimum was reduced to operating between Clignancourt and Gare du Nord and between Vavin and Porte d'Orleans. The fall in the level of flooding during February allowed a gradual resumption of operations, but full service was not restored to 6 April after repair of extensive damage caused to the infrastructure.

During the politically turbulent 1930s, Line 4 had its own drama: on 27 July 1934, a package left in a carriage was carried into the office of its chief supervisor, located on the platform of Montparnasse. The package exploded, killing the chief supervisor and another officer and wounding four passengers. The assassins were never found.

During World War II the most violent bombing Paris suffered was on the night of 20 and 21 April 1944 when the rail freight yard of la Chapelle and the main truck workshop at Rue Championnet were hit. The roof of the Simplon station was hit by a bomb and it collapsed on the tracks and platforms. After repairs the line was brought back into service a few days later.

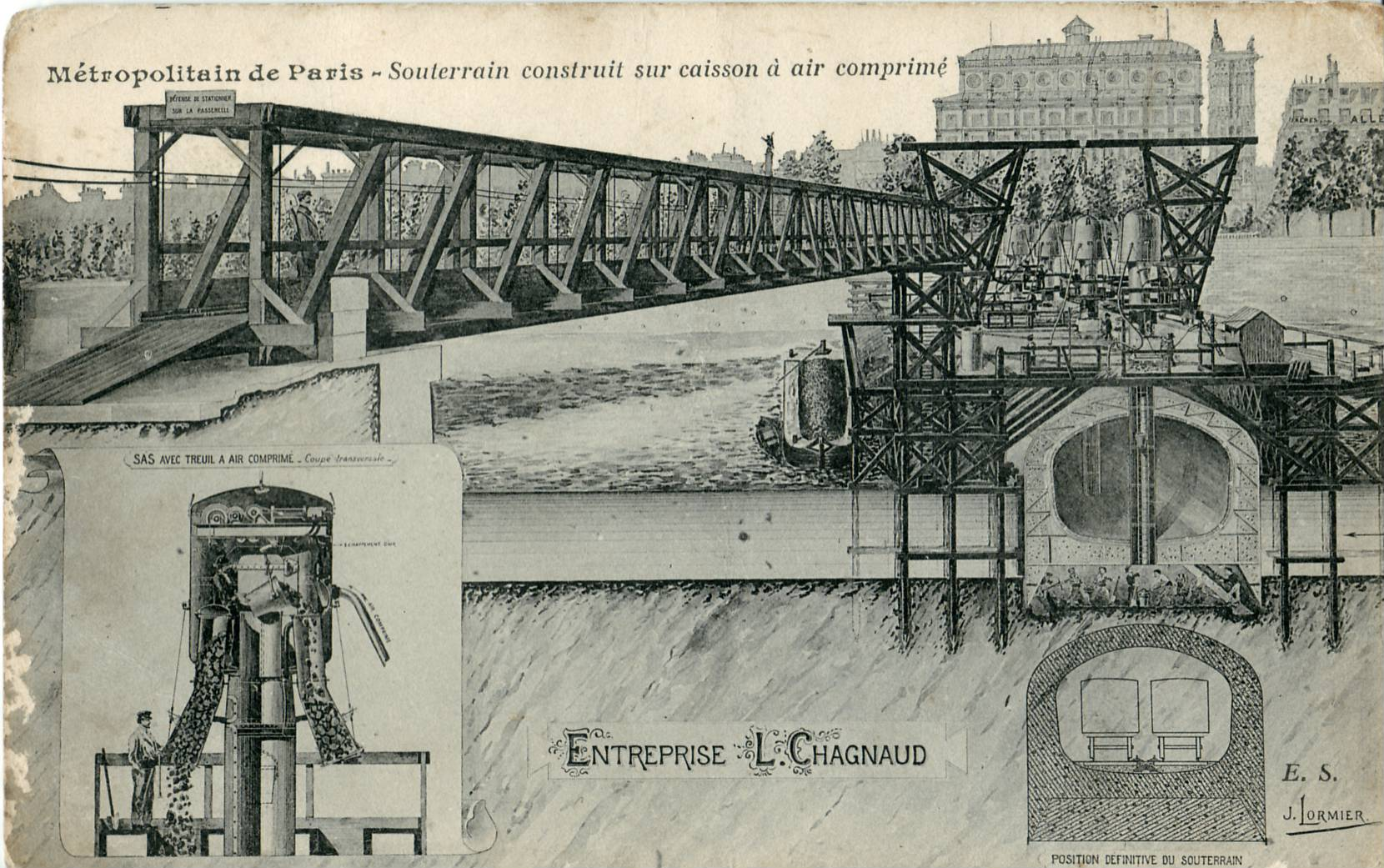
Postcard explaining the construction of the crossing under the Seine by the use of pressurised sunken caissons

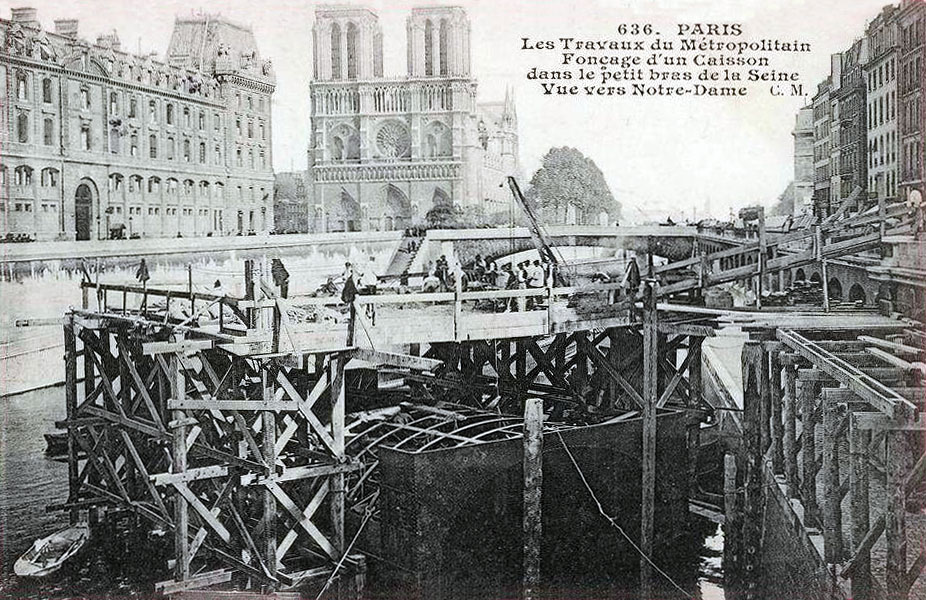
Sinking of a caisson in the narrow (southern) stream of the Seine in 1906

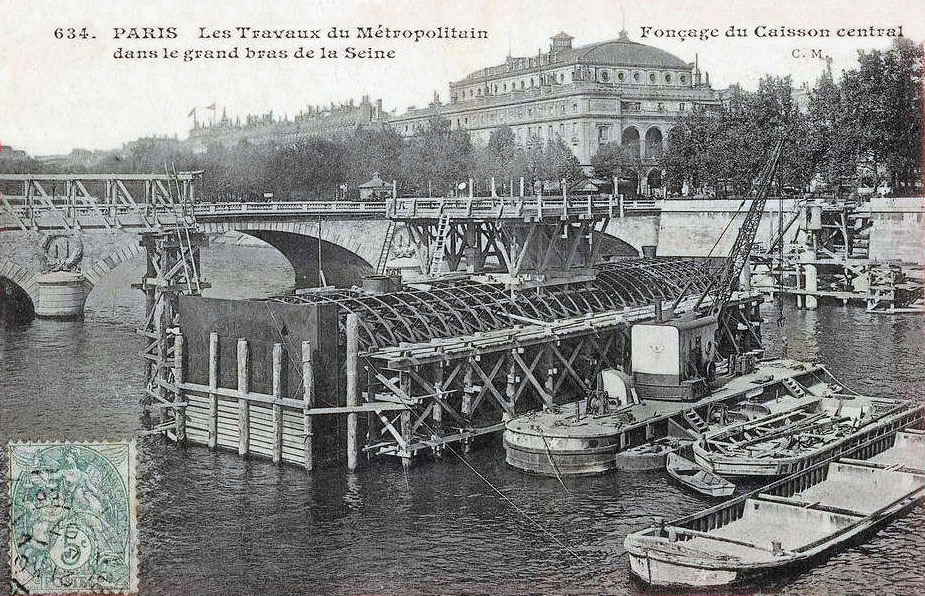
Sinking of the central caisson in the northern stream of the Seine

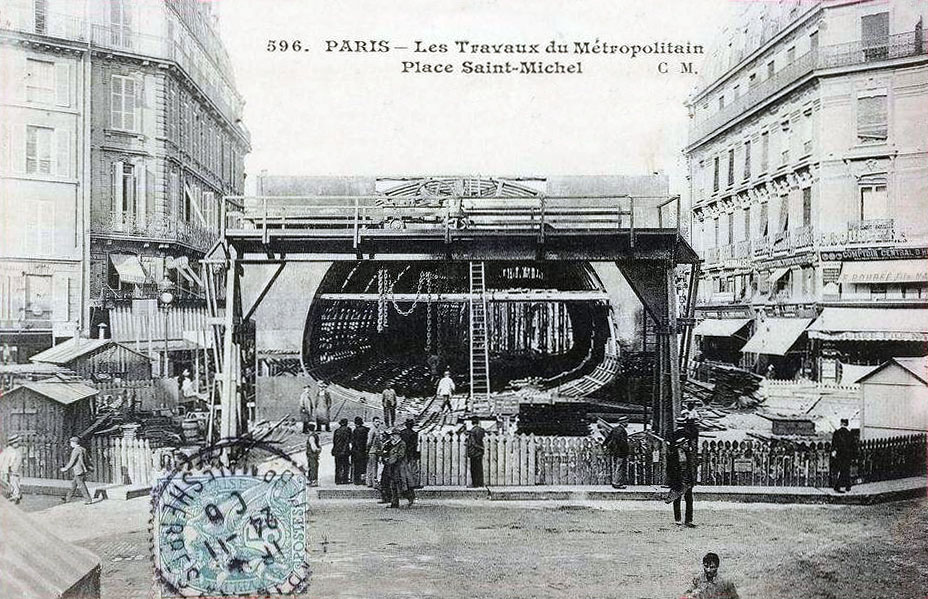
Sinking of the Saint-Michel station

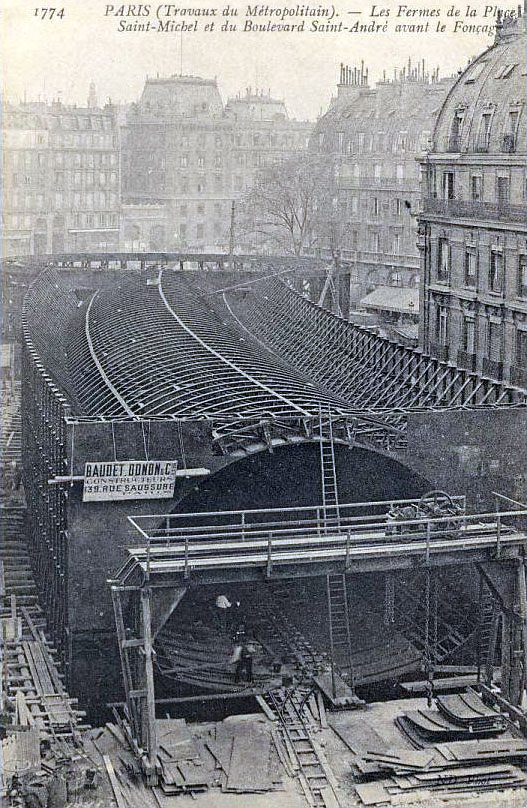
Work sites in the Place Saint-Michel and Boulevard Saint-Andre before the sinking

=== The rubber tyre metro and the deviation of the line ===
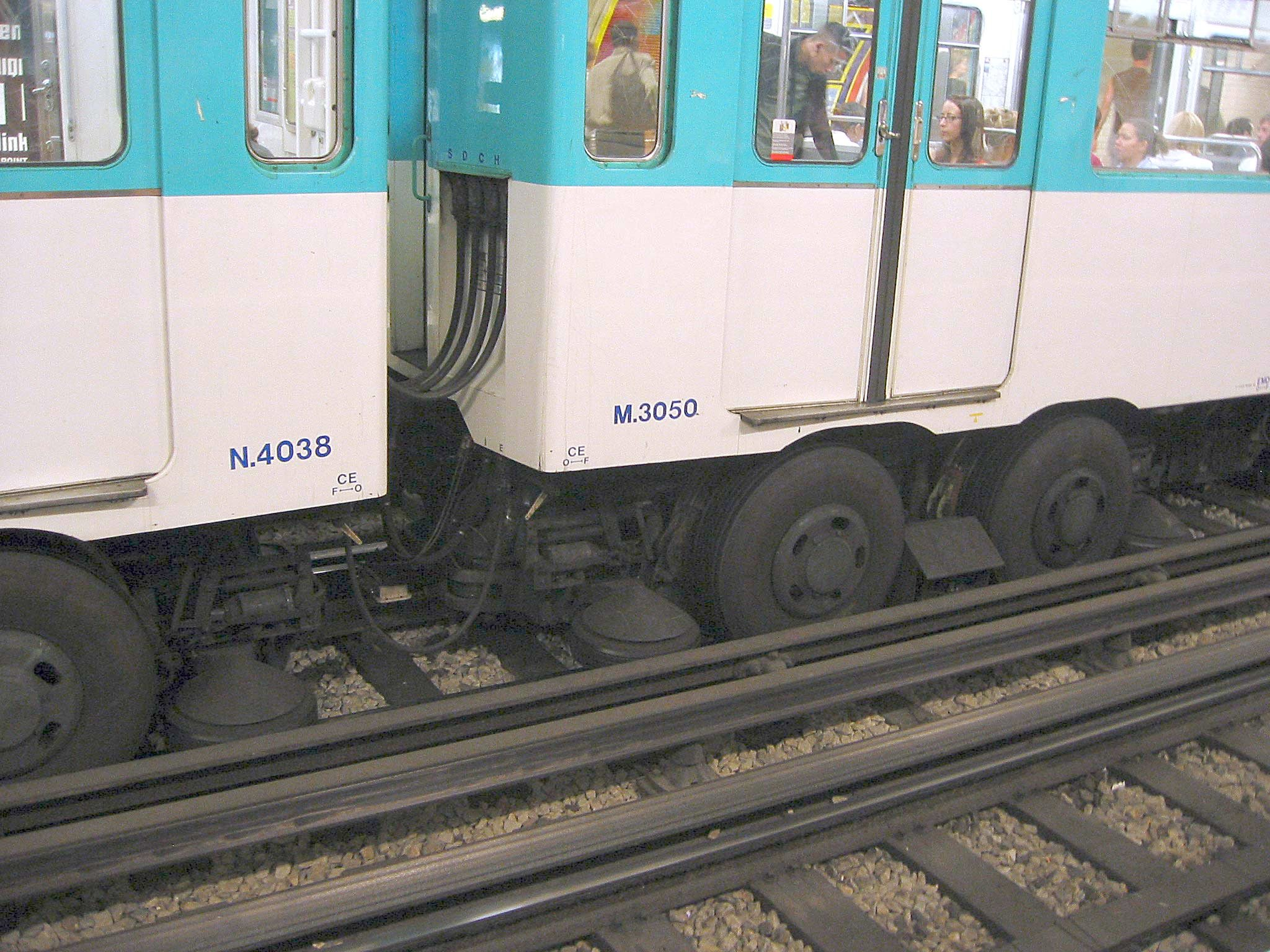
MP 59 rubber-tyred trains.

The RATP was satisfied by experimentation with rubber tyres on Line 11 beginning in 1956. It therefore decided to equip lines 1 and 4 for rubber-tyre operations, which can increase line capacity by providing better acceleration and decelerations as a result of a much superior grip.

In the early 1960s these two lines were the two busiest on the network, with loads of 140% of capacity during the evening peak. However, as this change alone was insufficient to overcome this saturation, the length of stations was lengthened from 75 to 90 metres (246 ft 1 in to 295 ft 3 in), allowing the lengthening of train from five to six carriages. This work was carried out very quickly and, as early as October 1965, trains of six carriages traversed the line. On 3 October 1966, the first train composed of MP 59 electric multiple units operated on the line. The Line 4 trains were identical to those on Line 1, being composed of four motors and two trailers per train. The line's MP 59 fleet included 556 carriages: 376 powered carriages and 180 trailers. On 17 July 1967, the last steel-wheeled train left the line to strengthen the service of others with a hundred cars built before 1914 scrapped. In February 1971, line 4 was the second network after line 11 to be equipped with semi-automatic operation, with a system known as Grecque ("Greek"). This allowed trains to run automatically once started by the driver and stop at the next station.

Since its opening the only change of the route of the line took place in early October 1977 with the deviation of the line with the relocation of the station at Les Halles. During the excavation of the enormous Les Halles complex the station of Les Halles was relocated about ten metres further east to allow a shorter connection to Châtelet – Les Halles RER station. For this, three hundred and thirty meters of tunnel were built to join the old route. The changeover took place on three consecutive nights from 10 PM on Friday, 30 September 1977 to the beginning of services on Monday, 3 October. On the first night, the new track 2 was connected, on the second night, the new track 1 was built and on the last night it was connected.

On 6 August 2005 at 4:42 pm, a fire on a train at Simplon due to the malfunction of a circuit breaker caused the evacuation of two MP 59 trains with 19 people mildly affected. The fire was extinguished by fire fighters at around 6:00 pm.

=== Extension to Montrouge and the MP 89 ===
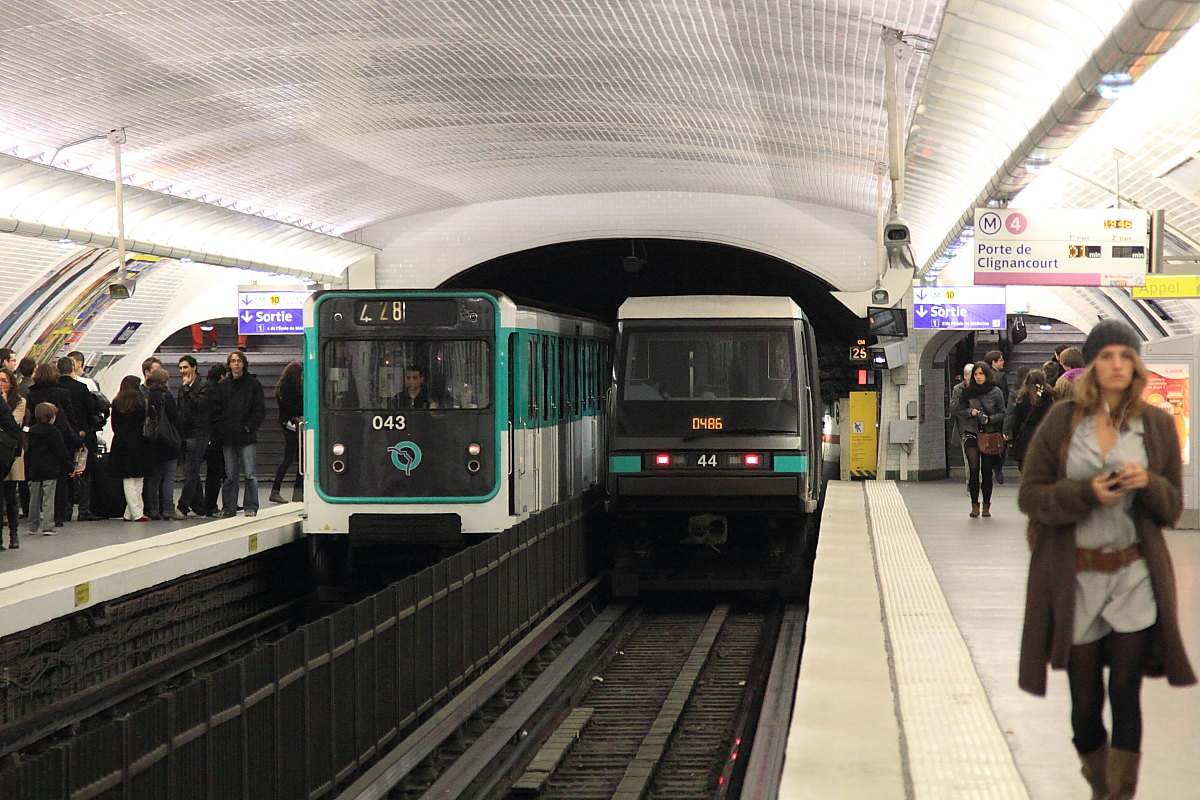
Transition of rolling stock from the MP 59 to the MP 89 took place during 2011 and 2012.

Until 2013, Line 4 was one of a few lines (the others being semicircular lines 2 and 6, as well as the then new Line 14) that had never been extended beyond the "gates" of Paris. During the 1920s, a preliminary extension towards la Vache-Noire was planned but never carried out. Since that time, no other extension plan was brought up. In 2008, nearly a century after its opening, construction of a one-station extension towards Mairie de Montrouge began. The new station officially opened to passengers on 23 March 2013, allowing one to travel from Montrouge to Clignancourt in 30 minutes. Mairie de Montrouge is a traditional two-tracked station.

In addition to the Montrouge extension, in 2011 there has been a much needed refreshing in rolling stock for Line 4, as the MP 59 trainsets were reaching the end of their useful lives. The automation of Line 1 and purchasing of new automated rolling stock (the MP 05) allowed the RATP to replace the MP 59 with the MP 89CC rolling stock from Line 1. Testing of the MP 89 during overnight hours took place in 2010, with the first train (#01) to be transferred to Line 4 in April, 2011 and enter service on 23 May 2011. A second train (#44) entered service on 10 September 2011. The first MP 59 train that was retired was #6049, which was pulled from service in April, 2011.

As the MP 05 rolling stock began to debut on Line 1, the pace of transferring the MP 89CC stock from Line 1 to Line 4 increased to roughly 3 trains per month. Since January 2012, the RATP kept this rate of transfer (increasing the rate to 4 trains during November and December) despite only being able to remove 2 MP 59 trainsets from service each month. During the course of 2011, the following trains were transferred from Line 1 to Line 4: #s 14, 20, 29, 30, 31, 34, 38, and 40. Train #s 03 through 25, 27 through 42, 43, 44, 48, 49, 51, and 52 were transferred during the course of 2012. #45 was transferred on 3 January 2013, marking the 47th train to be moved to Line 4. Between February and March 2013, #s 02, 46, 47, and 50 were transferred. The final MP 89CC train was #26. The last MP 59 train to be pulled from service was #6021, which was withdrawn on 21 December 2012. Though many MP 59 trains operated on Line 4 for roughly 45 years, those trains that were brought over from Line 1 during the late 1990s have circulated throughout the Metro for about 50 years.

=== Extension to Bagneux ===
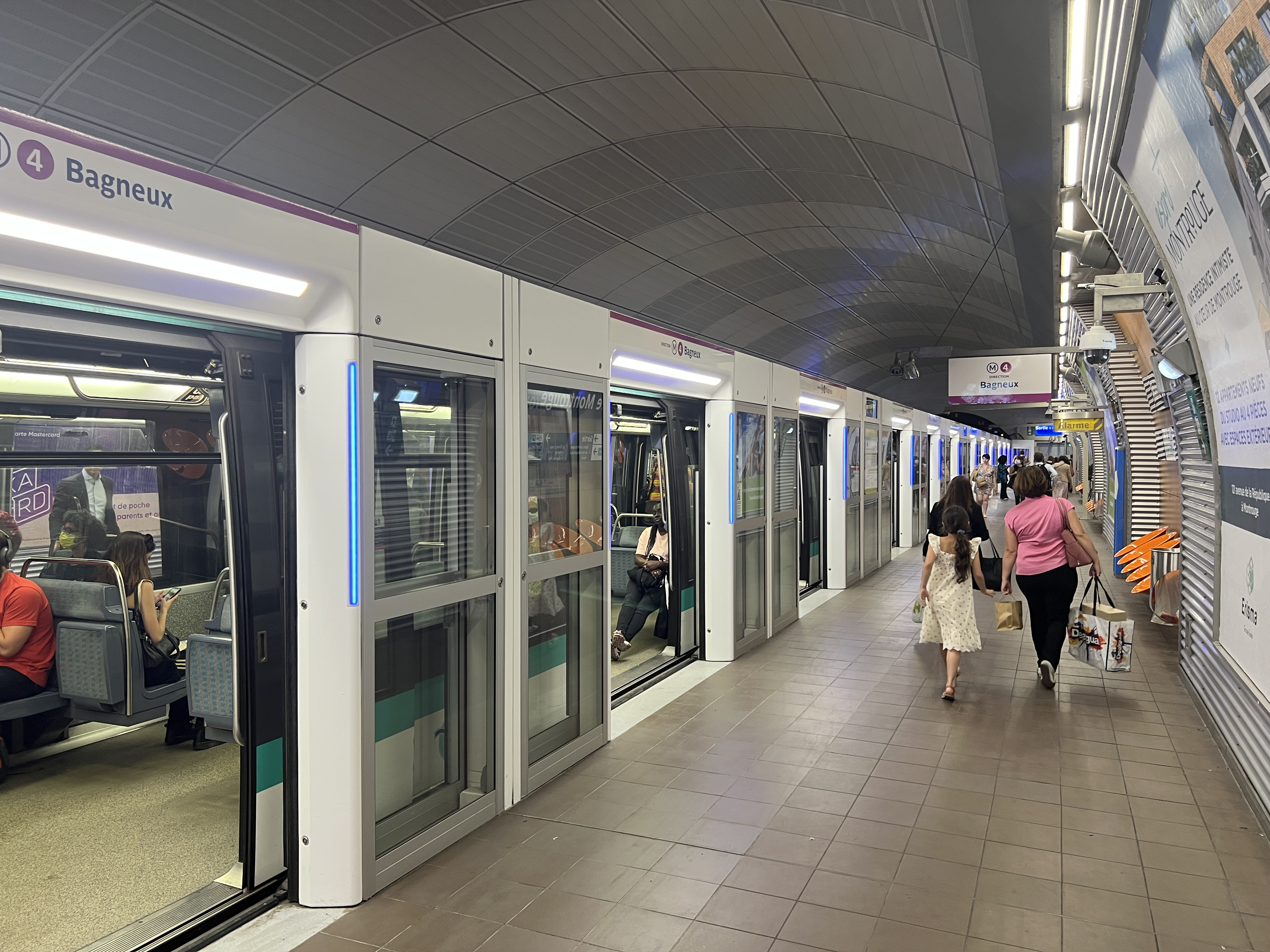
Mairie de Montrouge

Following the opening of Mairie de Montrouge, plans were already in the works to further extend Line 4 another 1.8km southward. This extension consists of two stations: Barbara at the border between Montrouge and Bagneux (in Montrouge) and Bagneux–Lucie Aubrac. Construction began in 2014, and service opened on 13 January 2022. In April 2027, Bagneux-Lucie Aubrac will provide a connection to the upcoming Line 15 of Grand Paris Express.

=== Automation of the line ===
Following the implementation of full automation of line 1, completed at the end of 2012, automation of line 4 was studied. Pierre Mongin, Chairman and CEO of RATP, confirmed that automation would go ahead on 2 April 2013. He announced that it could be implemented from 2017 when the automatic MP 89 and MP 05 trains from line 14 could be transferred to line 4; line 14 would then receive the new 8-car MP 14 trains, to cope with the increase in passenger numbers expected from its extension as part of the Grand Paris project. The improvement in regularity and safety brought by automation would be increased, as on line 1, with the installation of platform screen doors built by Faiveley Transport, manufacturer of platform screen doors for line 14.

Given the positive results of the full automation of line 1, on 10 July 2013, the STIF (now IDFM) authorised the launch of technical studies in 2013. The automation of line 4, which was estimated to cost €256 million, would be financed with €100 million from the STIF and the remainder by the RATP, the project owner. It was announced that work would start in 2014 and be completed by 2022. The financing agreement was adopted by the STIF in June 2014.

Work finally began in 2016. The installation of the platform doors and the first tests of the system began in the second quarter of 2018. At that time, it was expected that the first driverless trains would be running in 2020 and the completion of automation was planned for 2022. The project was two years behind schedule: at the end of 2021, the first automatic trains were expected to run in the summer of 2022, with full automation completed by the end of 2023.

The new centralised control station was put into service on 3 May 2020.

The first four automatic trains began operating on 12 September 2022. Other automatic sets were added gradually to make the line fully automatic. Operation has been possible with only automatic trains since 15 December 2023. The automation of the line was inaugurated a month later on 19 January 2024.

=== Traffic ===
Line 4 was once the busiest line in the Paris network, until Line 1 overtook it in 1997. From 1992 to 2004, traffic increased by 3.7%, which only places the line in ninth place in terms of growth on the network (excluding Line 14). This low growth is explained, for Line 4 itself or for the metro network as a whole, in part by significant declines in ridership when the RER B at Saint-Michel–Notre-Dame came into service in 1988, the RER D in 1995 and the RER E in 1999.

Year	1995	1996	1997	1998	1999	2000	2001	2002	2003	2004	2009	2010	2012	2014	2016	2018	2019	2020	2021	2022	2023	2024
Number of passengers (in millions)	122.5	133.5	130.9	135.7	135.1	131.9	139.8	134.9	138.1	154.1	172	173.9	174.4	163.6	157.9	152.2	158.5	79.7	106	138	151.8	161

The busiest stations served by the line are, in descending order (in annual traffic, all lines included): Gare du Nord (36.49 million passengers), Montparnasse - Bienvenüe (29.46 million), Gare de l'Est (15.66 million), Châtelet (12.84 million), Les Halles (12.63 million), Barbès - Rochechouart (9.14 million), Strasbourg - Saint-Denis (8.76 million). In 1998, daily traffic reached 463,974 passengers on average each working day, 361,313 on Saturdays and 209,955 on Sundays. In 2003, annual traffic reached 137,939,350 passengers, with a daily traffic of 458,148 passengers on average each working day, 374,501 on Saturdays and 241,681 on Sundays. In 2009, annual traffic was 172 million passengers, an increase of 24.5% in six years. Traffic on a normal working day reached 674,000 passengers in 2010, 676,000 in 2011 and 740,000 in 2012.

== Planned Northern Extension towards Saint-Ouen ==
Phase 1 (2007–2013) of the Schéma directeur de la région Île-de-France ("Master Plan for the Île-de-France region", SDRIF), adopted by resolution of the Regional Council of Ile-de-France on 25 September 2008, included a Northward extension to the "docks" of Saint-Ouen (an urban redevelopment project next to the Seine) via Mairie de Saint-Ouen (where Line 4 would connect to Line 13's St. Denis branch and to Line 14). However no detailed studies have yet been carried out, nor any funding set aside.

== Rolling Stock ==
Around 1930, Line 4 was equipped with rolling stock known as "Sprague" M4 sets. They were not replaced until the line was converted to accommodate the rubber-tyred metro sets, after having operated more than 3 million km (1.9 million mi).

Vidéo of MP 59 sets at Vavin station

The replacement was carried out gradually between October 1966 and July 1967 by MP 59 sets. When the MP 89s arrived on line 1 in 1997, the renovated MP 59s from line 1 were transferred to line 4, while the renovated MP 59s from line 4 were transferred to line 11. This resulted in the disappearance of the last MP 55s from line 11 at the end of 1998 and the last on the system at the beginning of 1999. The other non-renovated MP 59s were retired. The MP 59 trains on line 4 were made up of six cars (MNABNM). The line's fleet consisted of 47 trains in 2010.

The automation of line 1 from 2011 being accompanied by new rolling stock, the MP 05, the MP 89s of this line were gradually assigned to line 4. The first train (CC01) was put into commercial service on 23 May 2011. The old MP 59s were gradually reformed as the trains are transferred. At the beginning of February 2012, eleven MP 89 type trains were operating on line 4.

On 21 December 2012, the last MP 59s were retired from the line, after 45 years of operation on this line and 49 years since their entry into service on line 1.

In 2016, it was decided, according to the 2018–2023 timeline, that the MP 89 CC sets would be cascaded to line 6 and would be replaced by three different sets which would coexist on line 4: the MP 89 CA and the MP 05 coming from line 14, as well as 20 new MP 14s in the six-car version. These projects were significantly delayed and, in 2021, no commercial circulation of the transferred vehicles had yet taken place.

Finally, on 12 September 2022, the first four automatic trains were put into service. Since then, MP 89 CA, MP 05 and MP 14 have been running on the line, at the same time as the MP 89 CC. The last MP 89 CC left the line on 15 December 2023.

== Workshops ==
The rolling stock of line 4 is maintained at the Saint-Ouen workshops, extending over an area of 34,000 square metres (370,000 sq ft) and opened in 1908. They are connected to the rear station of the terminus and located in this commune just north of Porte de Clignancourt.

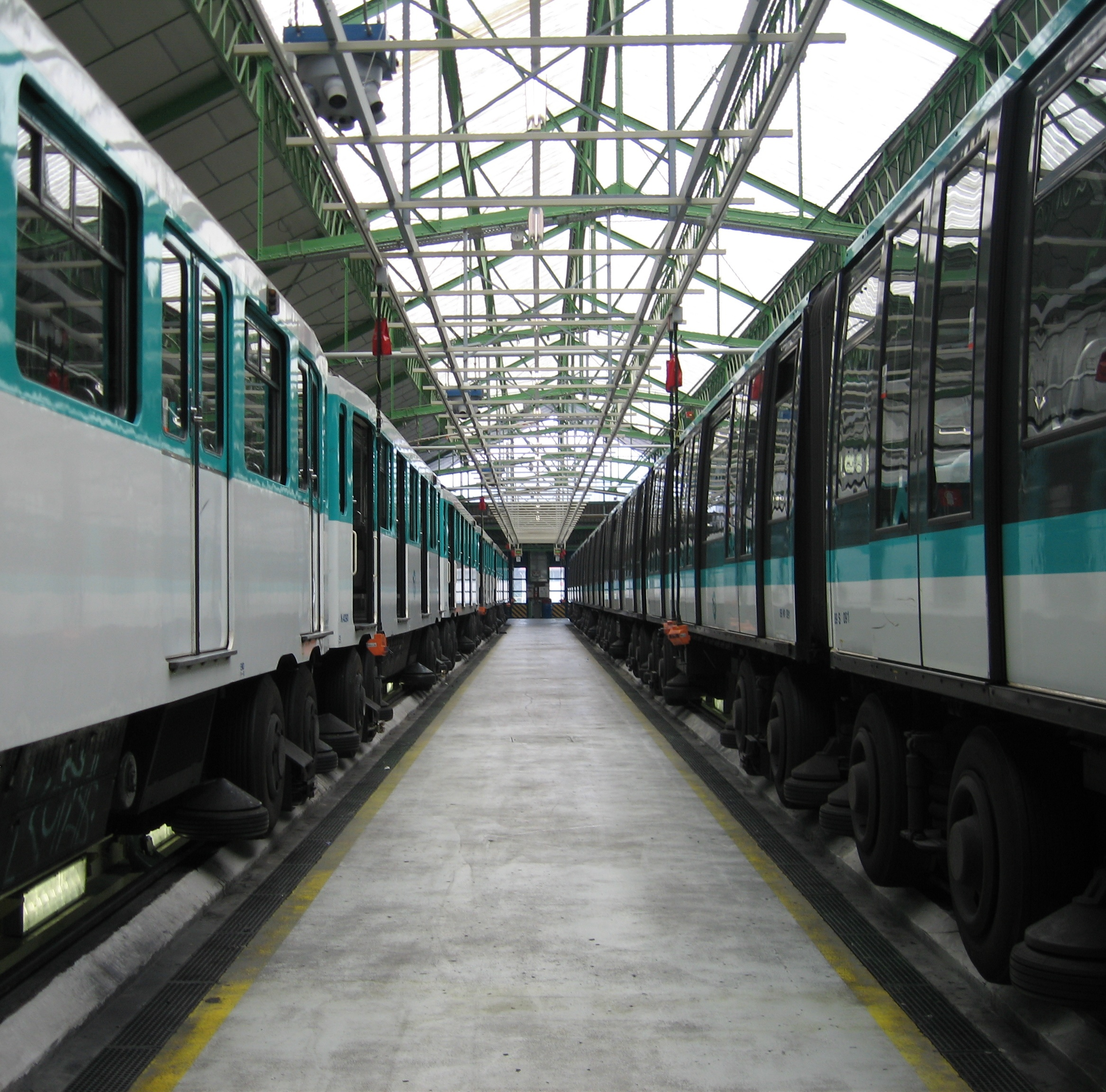
An MP 59 and an MP 89 CC at the Saint-Ouen workshops, in 2009.

These workshops provide routine maintenance of trains but also heavy maintenance and overhaul of MF 77 sets on lines 7, 8 and 13 as well as auxiliary vehicles. They also specialise in overhauling the electronic equipment of all network equipment. In 2007, 60 staff were assigned to train maintenance, 220 to equipment maintenance.

An inspection station located in the rear of the Bagneux–Lucie Aubrac station allows light maintenance operations and first-level troubleshooting to be carried out. Before the extension of the line to Mairie de Montrouge, this workshop was located on platform 2 towards Porte de Clignancourt at Porte d'Orléans station.

Heavy maintenance and regular overhaul (batteries, windings, paintwork) of the Line 4 sets, as with all the network's rubber-tyred equipment, takes place in the Fontenay workshops. They are located in the extension of the Line 1 tracks beyond the Château de Vincennes terminus. They are divided into two separate entities: a maintenance workshop for the Line 1 trains and an overhaul workshop for all the metro's rubber-tyred trains. The complex, which occupies a total area of approximately 39,000 square metres (420,000 sq ft), was modernised in the early 1960s for the arrival of the MP 59 sets; then the buildings were rebuilt for the arrival of the MP 89 sets during the 1990s. These workshops are also connected to the national rail network via the RER A tracks. Three hundred and thirty employees were assigned to this workshop in 2007.

== Map and stations ==
Geographical map of Paris Métro Line 4

=== Stations renamed ===
- 15 November 1913: Vaugirard station was renamed Saint-Placide.
- 5 May 1931: Boulevard Saint-Denis was renamed Strasbourg – Saint-Denis.
- 25 August 1931: Marcadet (on line 4) and Poissonniers (on line 12) were combined and the resulting station was renamed Marcadet – Poissonniers.
- 6 October 1942: Montparnasse (on lines 4 and 12) and Bienvenüe (on lines 6 and the current 13) were combined and the resulting station was renamed Montparnasse – Bienvenüe.

Map of Paris Métro Line 4.

=== Themed Stations ===
Seven stations on the line have original thematic cultural decoration. Most of them have been removed due to automation work.

- Réaumur–Sébastopol has an interactive exhibition devoted to the Conservatoire national des arts et métiers (CNAM), located nearby. There are also LCD screens that include interviews and short films on the teaching of the conservatory.
- Barbès–Rochechouart has an exhibit on the occupation of Paris during World War II, including newspaper clippings, photos, and a map showing the insurrection of Paris in August 1944
- Château d'Eau formerly had on its northern tympanum a fresco representing the fountain of the Château d'Eau erected in 1811 on the square of the same name (now Place de la République) on the site now occupied by the Monument to the Republic.
- Odéon has a small exhibit on the northbound platform that is dedicated to French revolutionary Georges Danton, with his bust and a copy of the decree proclaiming the First Republic in 1792.
- Saint-Germain-des-Prés is lined with scenery evoking the history of literary creation in the district. Excerpts from literary works are projected onto the ceiling, and the station is devoid of the usual advertising panels. Window displays featured stories by young literary talents. These decorations were removed due to preparatory work for the automation of the line, which included the modernisation of certain stations.
- Montparnasse – Bienvenüe contains an exhibit honoring Fulgence Bienvenüe, the principal engineer of the Paris Métro. It has been naturally selected as an exhibition space on the network technology and literary history of the subway in 2000 during its centennial. Many books citing excerpts from the subway especially adorn the grand hall that connects each of the four metro lines in the station (4, 6, 12, and 13).
- Mairie de Montrouge is home to a contemporary work of art by Hugues Reip. In addition, it has the particularity of being vaulted at platform level, unlike most of the stations built in recent decades.
- Mouton-Duvernet was once adorned with orange wall tiles when it was renovated in 1970. The orange styling quickly became known as the "Mouton style". This style has gradually disappeared from the stations which received it (including Mouton-Duvernet itself) since the 2000s in favor, once again, of beveled white tiles, as part of the Renouveau du Métro (metro renewal) program.
- Porte d'Orléans, the former terminus of the line, has a very wide platform towards Porte de Clignancourt. This is due to the filling of the track returning from the loop used before the extension to Mairie de Montrouge.

Furthermore, two stations have an original structure: the metal structure of Cité and Saint-Michel was mounted on the roadway and sunk into the ground during their construction. The stations are accessed through an elliptical shaft, also made of metal. Cité station has the particularity of being lit by globes.

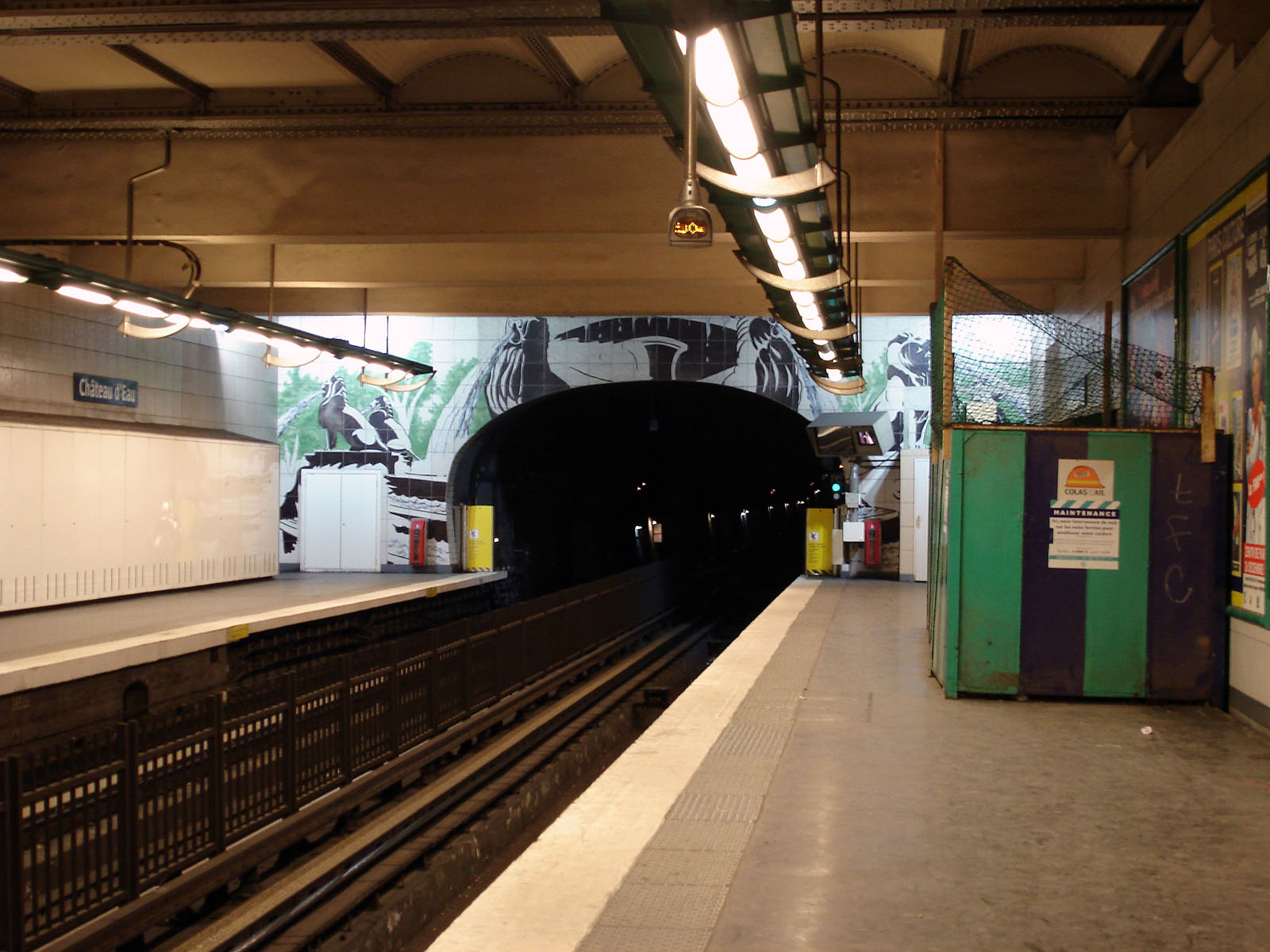
The fresco at Château d'Eau, which disappeared during the automation of the line.

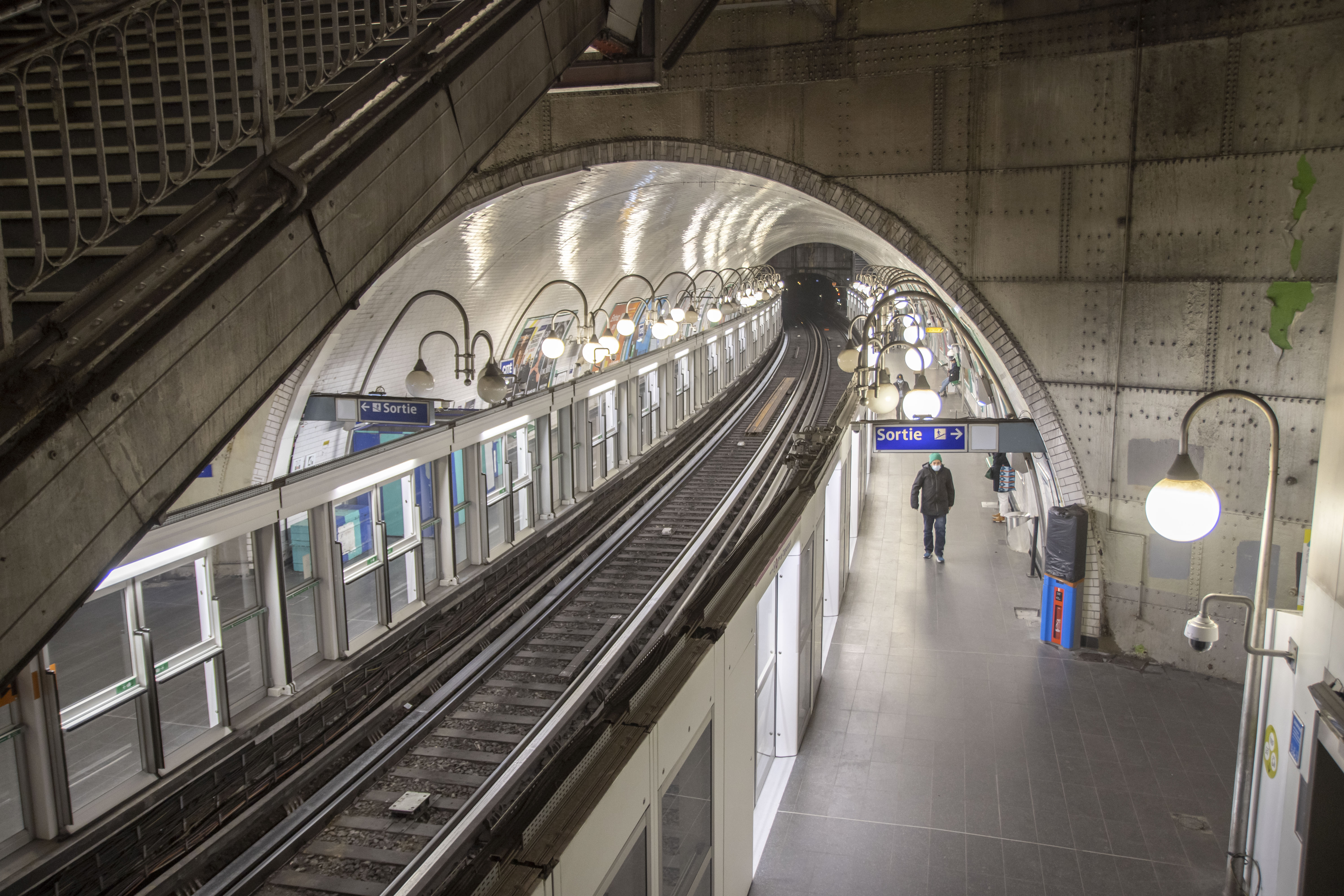
Cité station

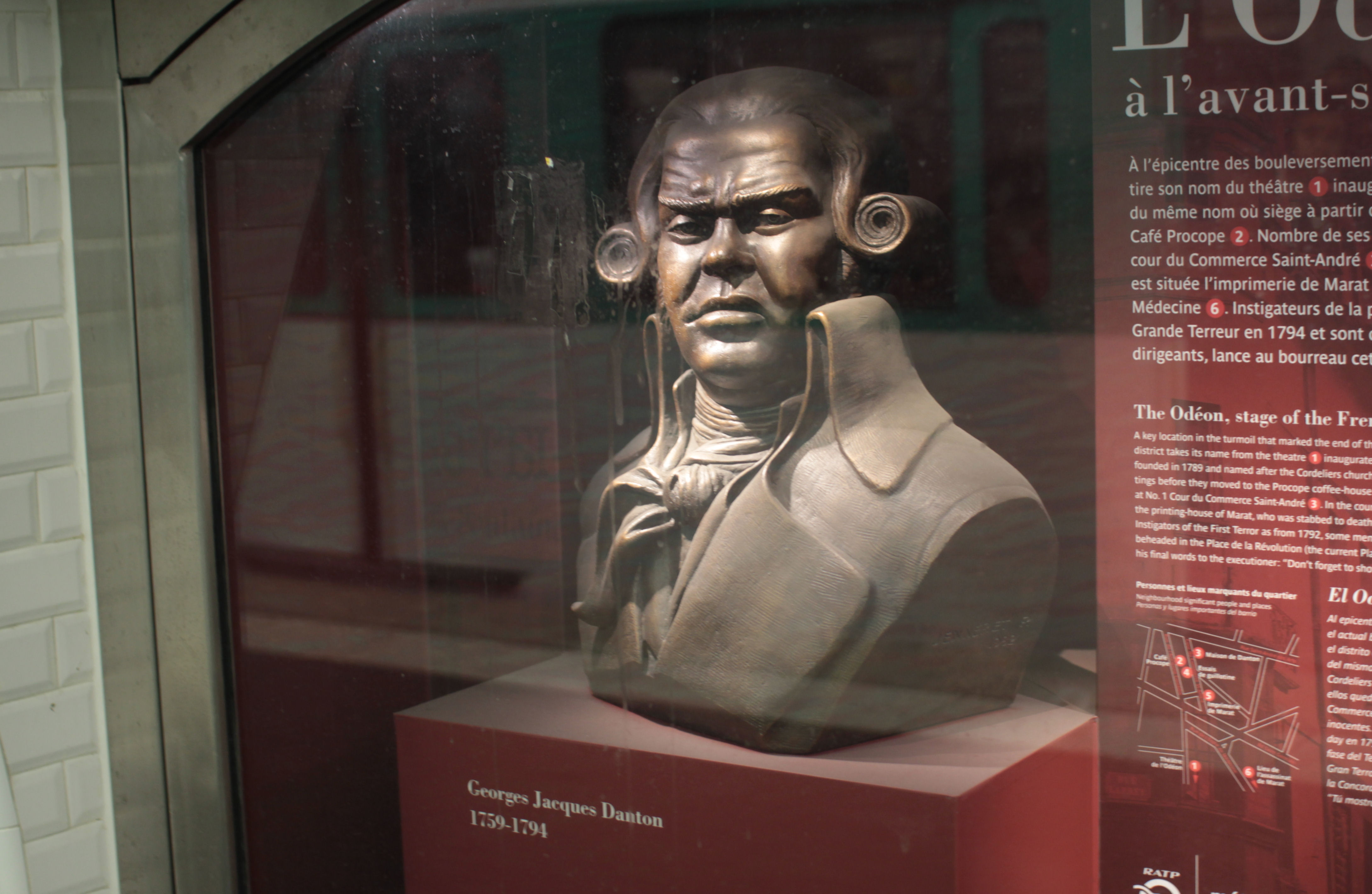
Bust of Danton at Odéon.

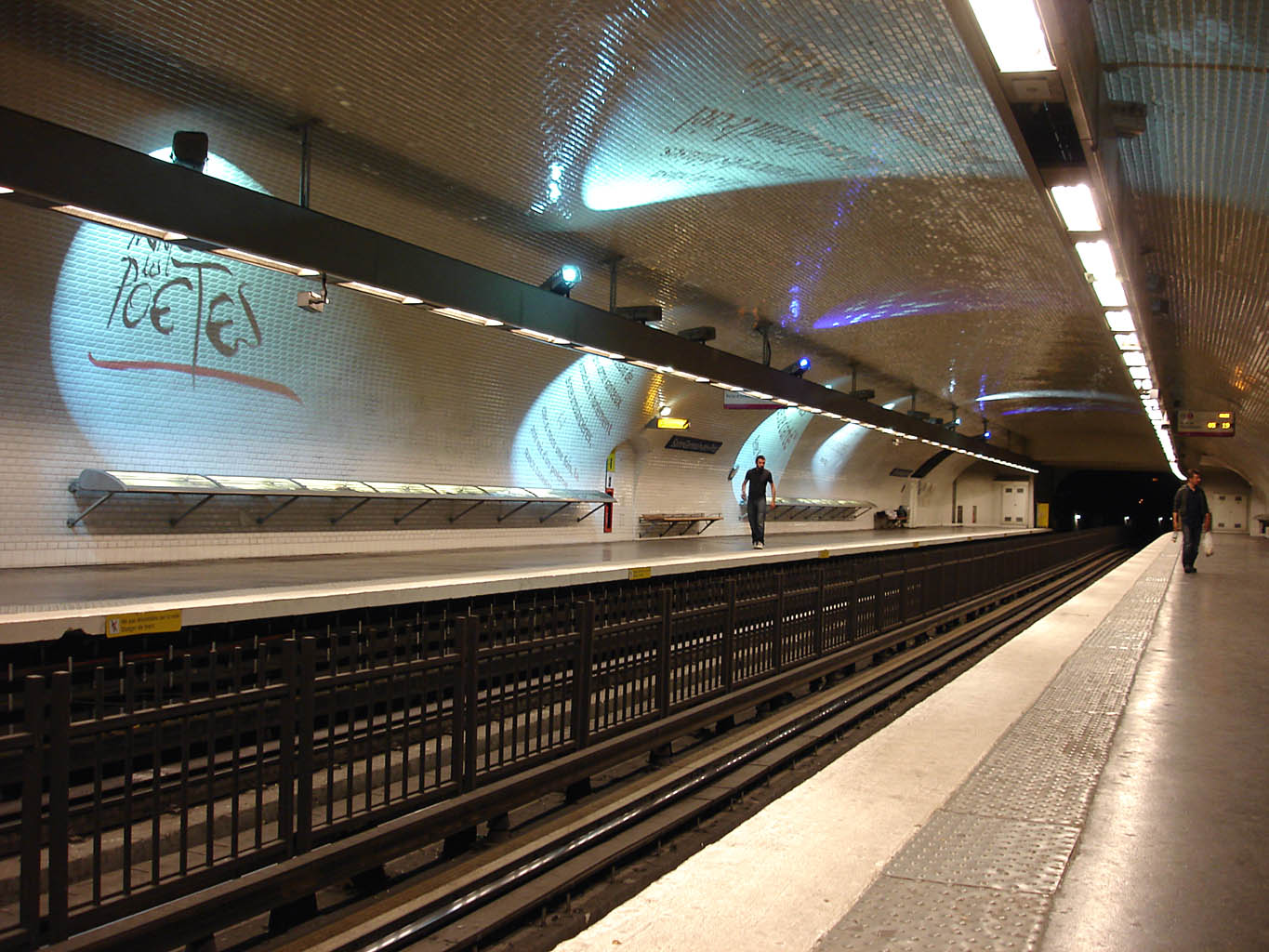
La station Saint-Germain-des-Prés before modifications during automation.

== Tourism ==
Line 4 serves Gare du Nord, Gare de l'Est and Gare Montparnasse. It passes through tourist districts and lively areas of the city, including (from north to south):

- the Saint-Ouen Flea Market, near the Porte de Clignancourt;
- the Château Rouge district where there is a large exotic market popular with Africans from all over the Île-de-France;
- Barbès and the Goutte d'Or, both with their African and Asian influences;
- Gare du Nord and Gare de l'Est, both highly used 19th century train stations;
- Les Halles forum and Les Halles district (Les Halles station);
- Place du Châtelet and its district (Châtelet station);
- the Île de la Cité with Notre-Dame Cathedral, Palais de Justice, Conciergerie and Sainte Chapelle (Cité station);
- Saint-Michel and the Latin Quarter;
- Saint-Sulpice church (Saint-Sulpice station);
- The Luxembourg Palace, home to the French Senate, and its Gardens;
- Montparnasse, its famous cafés, the Gare Montparnasse and the Montparnasse Tower;
- Denfert-Rochereau, the place where the entrance to the Parisian Catacombs is located (Denfert-Rochereau station).

Although the line serves very touristy areas, it is considered by some of its users as an unpleasant line to travel. In addition to its entirely underground route, it is the slowest line on the network and suffers from a certain discomfort (excessive heat, especially in summer) as well as an overall impression of dirt and insecurity, particularly given its very high traffic. Finally, attacks on people are by far the most frequent on the network, whether it is theft, with or without violence, or threats and violence (excluding theft).

== Reception ==
According to Facebook group New Urbanist Memes for Transit-Oriented Teens, Line 4 is considered "chaotic good" on the Dungeons & Dragons (D&D) alignment system.

== Gallery ==
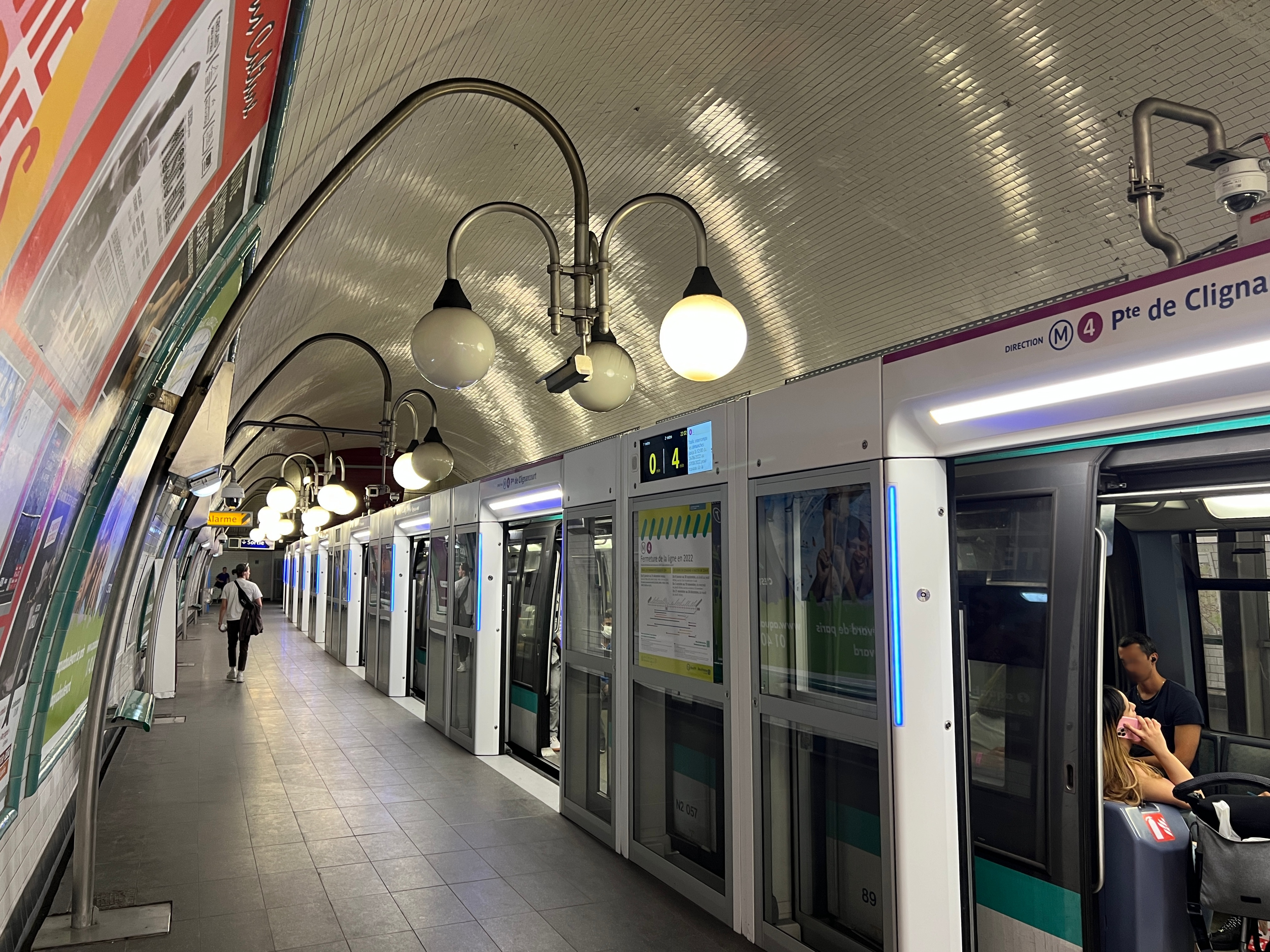
Cité

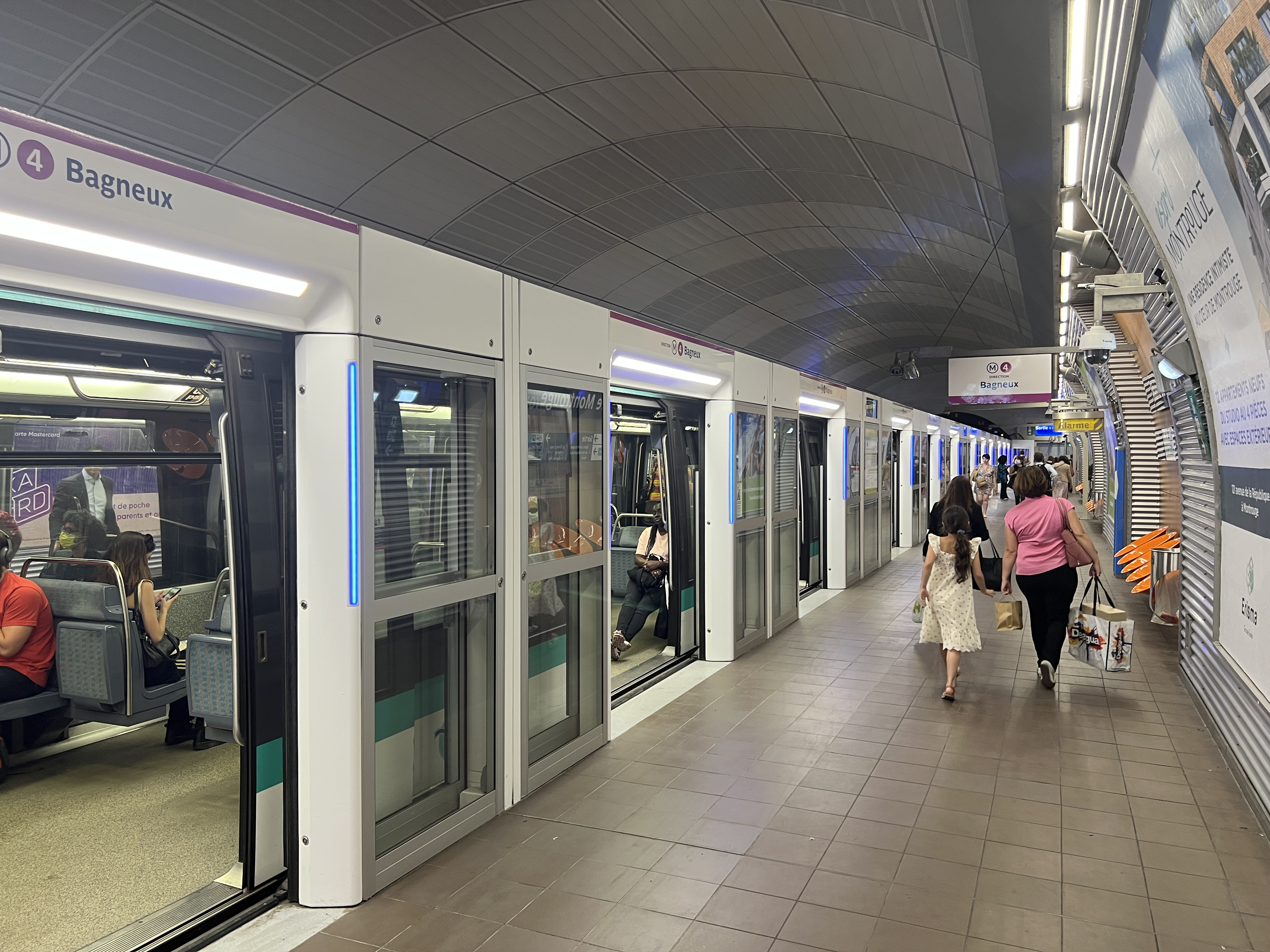
Mairie de Montrouge

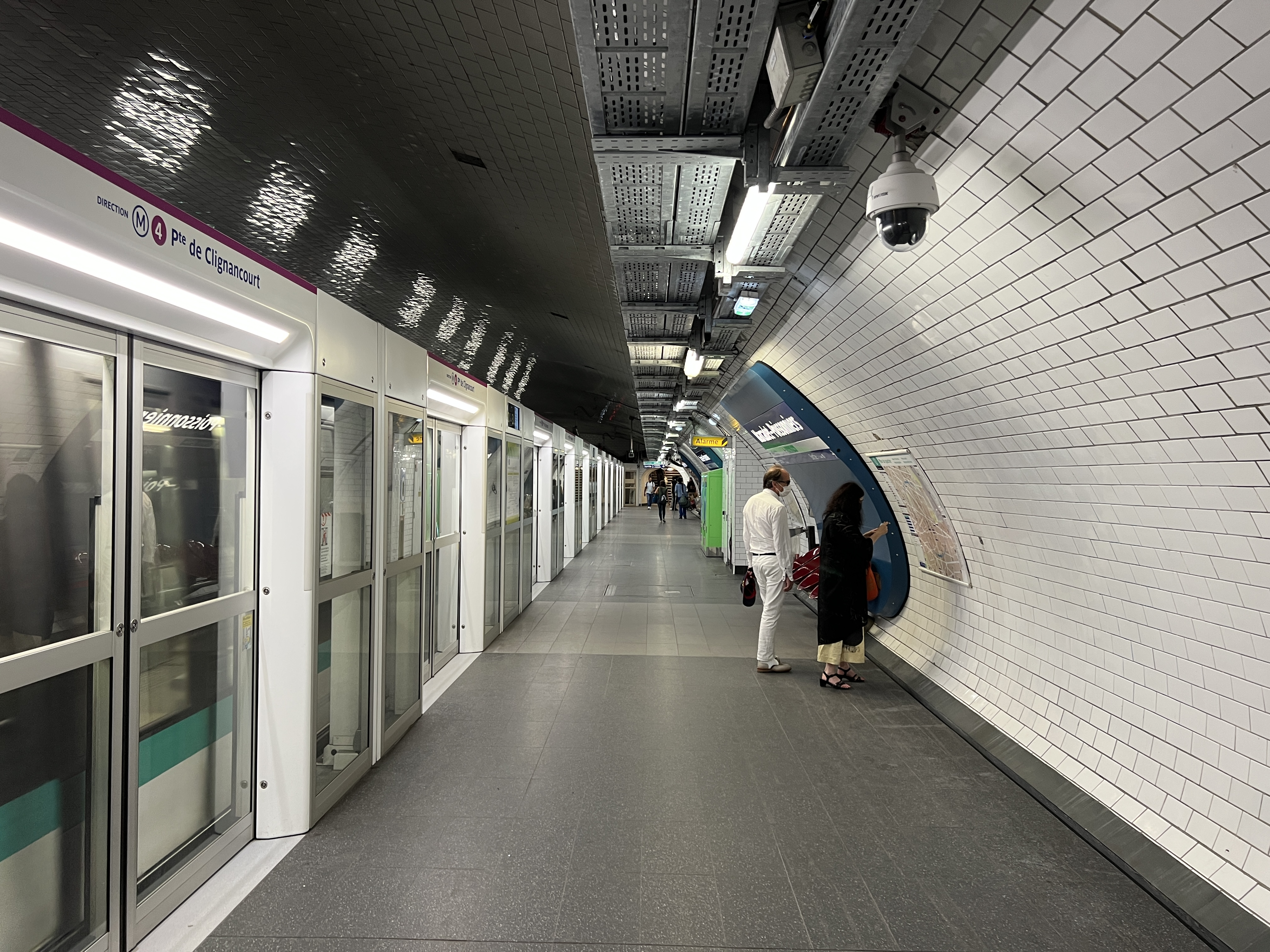
Marcadet – Poissonniers

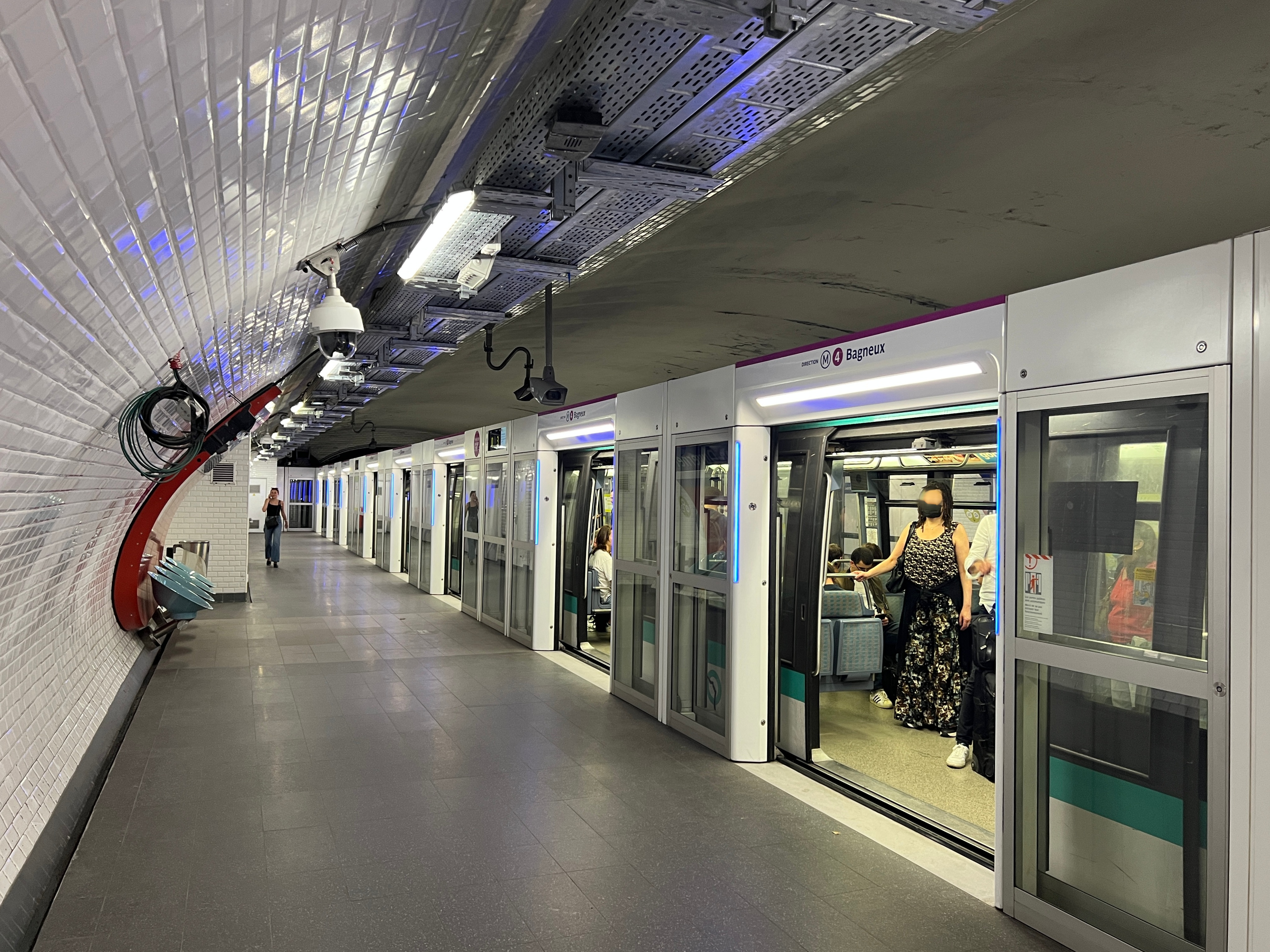
Mouton-Duvernet

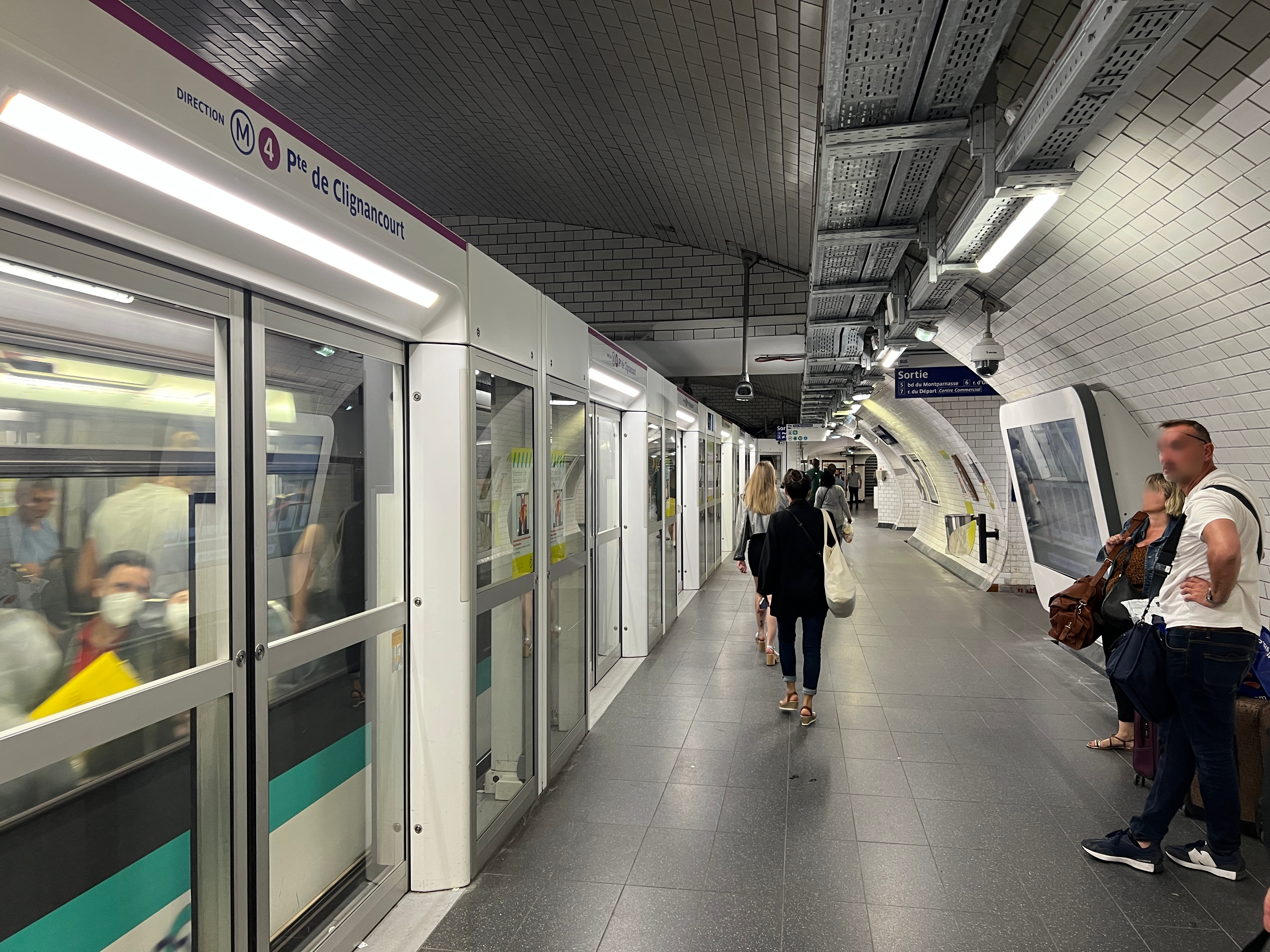
Montparnasse – Bienvenüe

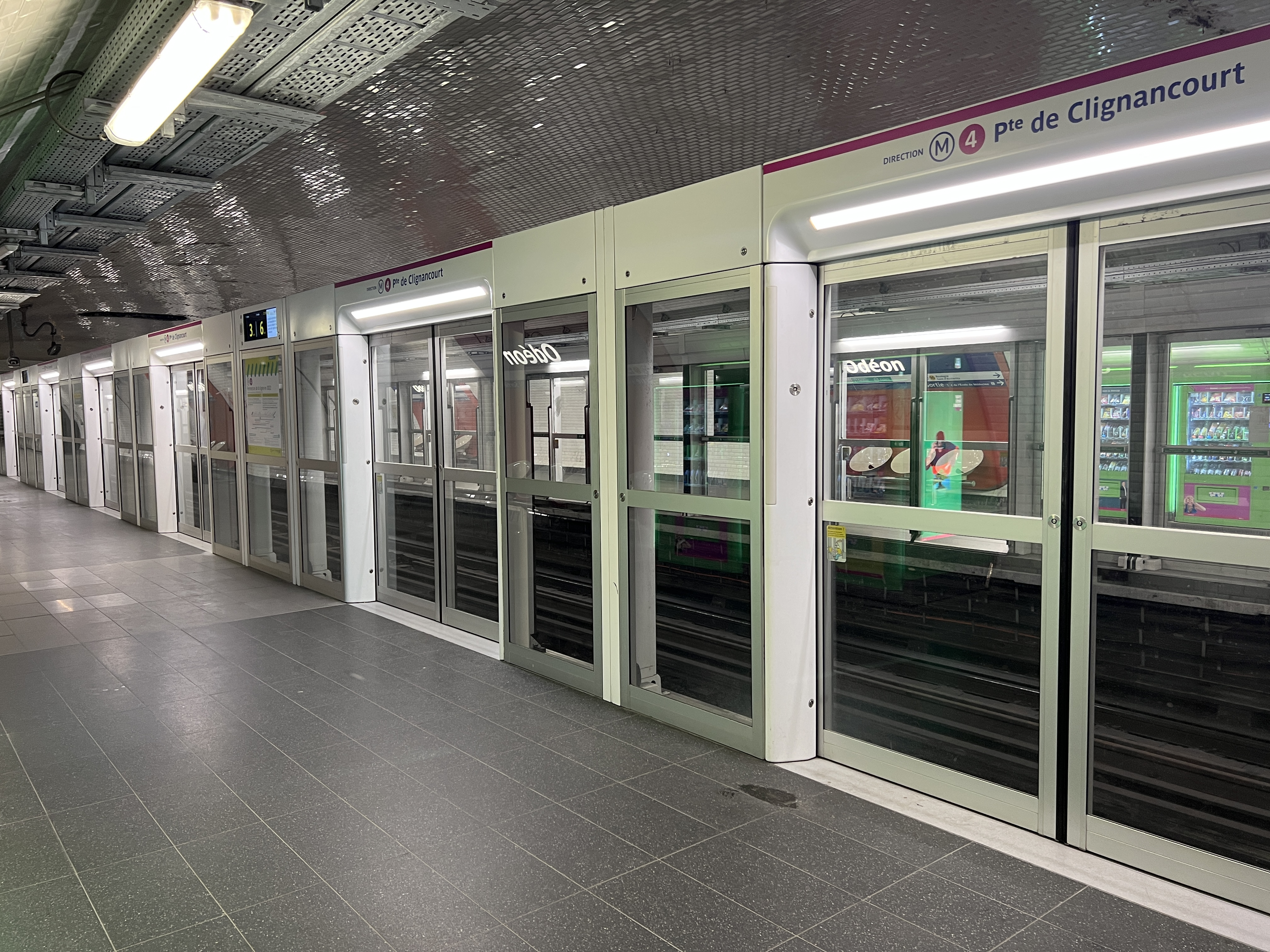
Odéon

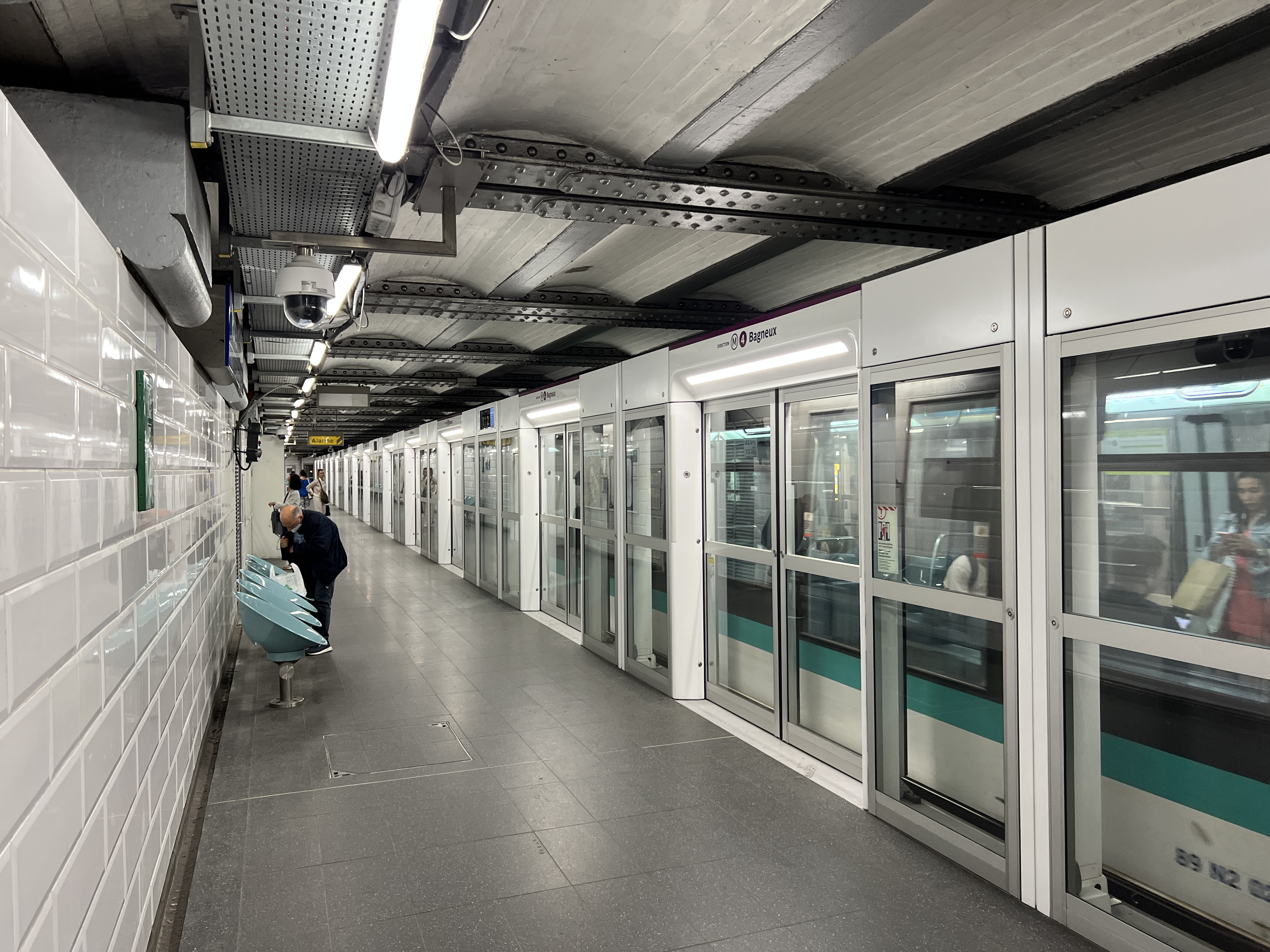
Porte d'Orleans

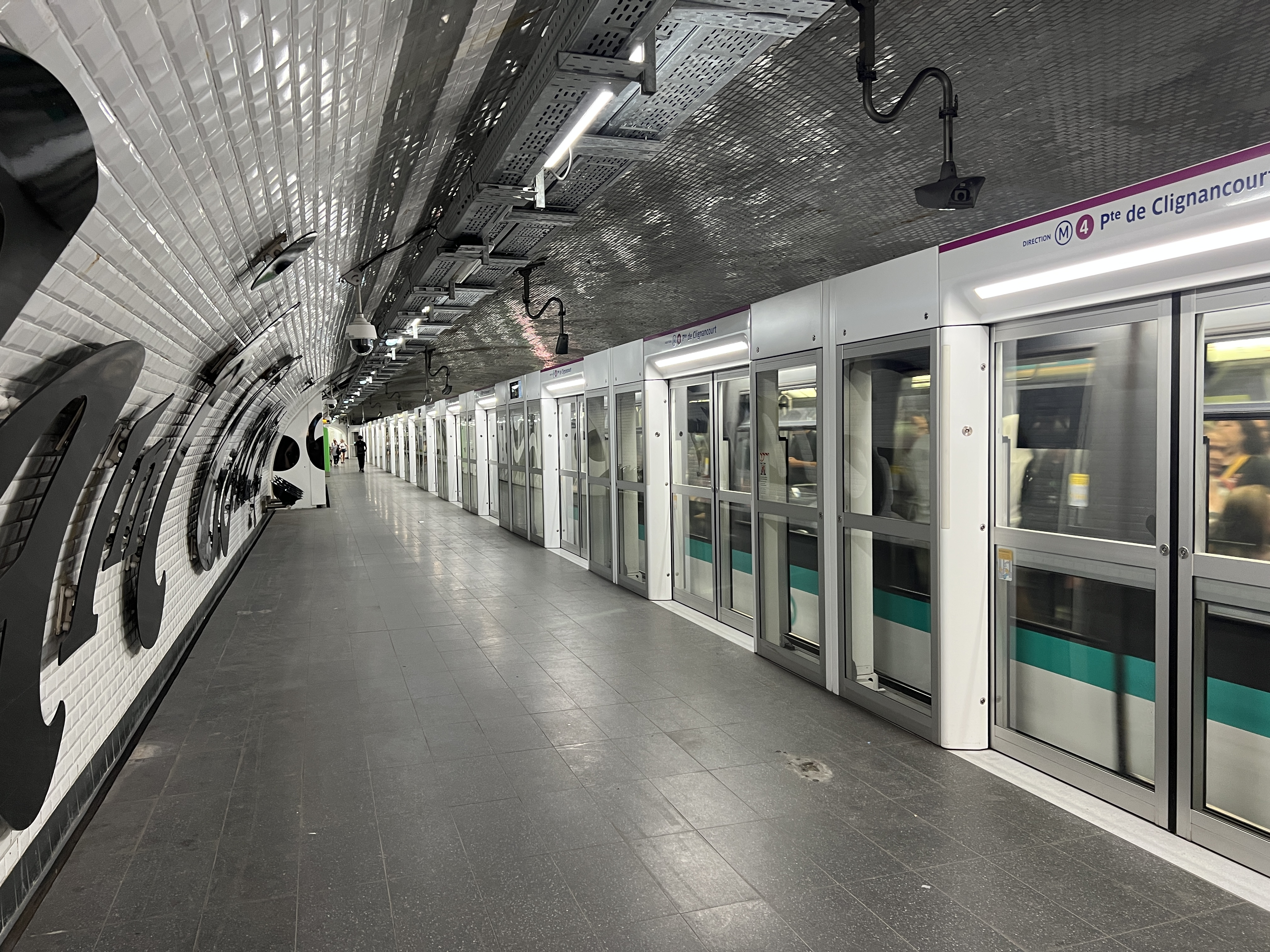
Saint-Germain-des-Prés

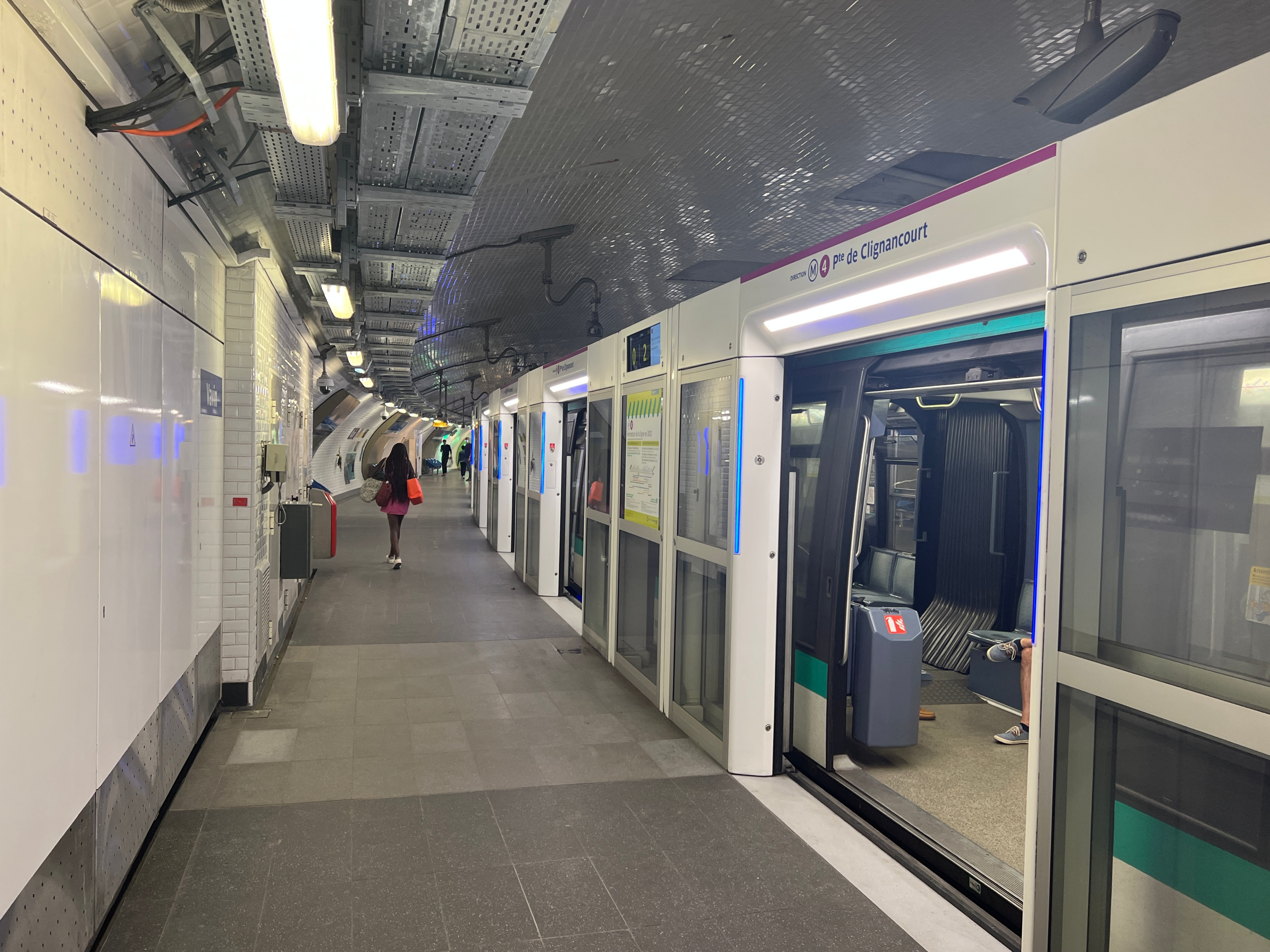
Vavin

Vavin

== See also ==
- Paris
- Transport in Paris
- List of stations of the Paris Métro
- List of stations of the Paris RER
- List of metro systems
- Rail transport in France
