= Cité station =

Metro station in Paris, France

Cité
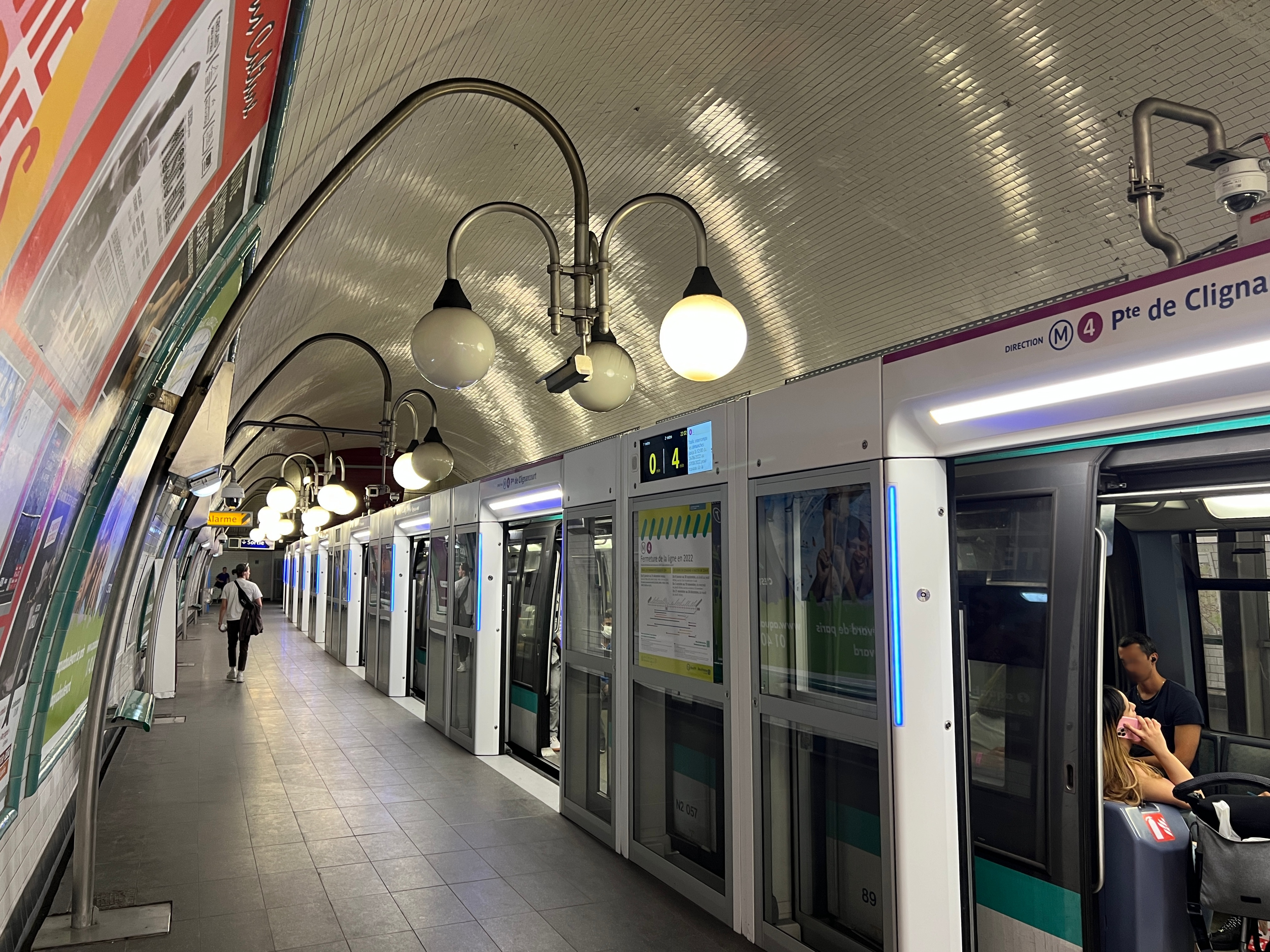
- Platforms at Cité after the installation of platform screen doors

General information
- Location: 2, Place Louis Lépine; 4th arrondissement of Paris; Île-de-France; France
- Coordinates: 48°51′19″N 2°20′47″E
- Owner: RATP
- Operator: RATP

Construction
- Accessible: Yes

Other information
- Fare zone: 1

History
- Opened: 10 December 1910

Services
Preceding station	Paris Metro	Following station
Saint-Michel towards Bagneux–Lucie Aubrac	Line 4	Châtelet towards Porte de Clignancourt
Location
- Location within Paris

Cité (French: [site]) is a metro station on Line 4 of the Paris Metro in the 4th arrondissement of Paris.

== Location ==
Cité station lies underneath the Île de la Cité, one of two islands on the Seine within the historical boundaries of Paris. In relation to the rest of the city, it lies within the 4th arrondissement, near kilometre zero, the official geographical and historical centre of Paris. The only station on the Île de la Cité, it lies near many famous landmarks, the most famous being the Notre-Dame de Paris (Cathedral of Notre Dame). To the west are the Sainte-Chapelle chapel and the Palace of Justice, while Notre Dame and the Hôtel-Dieu are to the east.

== History ==
The station was opened on 10 December 1910 on the section of the line under the Seine between Châtelet and Raspail. This section of the line had actually opened on 9 January 1910 but trains passed through the station without stopping until the December of that year. On 16 January it was completely submerged by the 1910 Great Flood of Paris.

It owes its name to its location under Île de la Cité, considered the ancient cradle of the city of Paris, formerly Lutetia. The name Cité refers to the fortified boundaries of Paris as they were at the end of antiquity, on the island, and which was the urban nucleus of the medieval city.

The station is also, with Rome on Line 2, Iéna on Line 9 as well as the Haxo ghost station between the 3 bis and 7 bis lines, one of the four whose name consists of four letters.

Along with the nearby Saint-Michel metro station, it was one of two stopping points equipped in 1911 with an elevator connecting the distribution room to the platforms, the other, the République metro station, which was the first in the network to benefit from it in 1910.

Tunnels were later built linking the station to the nearby Paris Police Prefecture and the Palais de Justice which were about 100 metres from the current entrance. These undergrounds were used in particular to escape the Germans during the Second World War. However, for security reasons, these tunnels have now been closed for more than thirty years.

The platforms were modernized after 1988 by the adoption of a particular variation of the Ouï-dire style, in this case green, characterized by globe candelabra lighting. As part of the RATP's Un métro + beau programme, the station corridors were renovated on 20 December 2012.

On 9 October 2019, half of the nameplates on the station's platforms were temporarily replaced by the RATP to celebrate the 60th anniversary of Asterix and Obelix, as in eleven other stations. Taking the characteristic typography of the comic strip of René Goscinny and Albert Uderzo, Cité is humorously renamed "Lutèce", a French-language form of the name used by the Romans to refer to Paris.

In 2019, according to RATP estimates, the station's annual travellers was 1,740,572 passengers, placing it 264th in the number of metro stations out of 302.

== Passenger services ==
=== Access ===
The station has a single entrance entitled Place Louis Lépine, leading to the right of building, 2 Place Louis Lépine. Consisting of a fixed staircase, it is decorated with a Guimard edicule, which is the subject of an inscription under the title of historical monuments by the decree of 25 July 1965.

The old exit, still visible, gave direct access to the police prefecture and the courthouse (Palais de Justice) in the Cour du Mai to the right of the monumental gate as one enters.

Access to the platforms is via fixed stairs or elevators.

=== Station layout ===
Street Level

B1	Mezzanine for platform connection

Line 4 platform level	Side platform with PSDs, doors will open on the right
Line 4 platform level	Northbound	← toward Porte de Clignancourt (Châtelet)
Line 4 platform level	Southbound	toward Bagneux–Lucie Aubrac (Saint-Michel) →
Line 4 platform level	Side platform with PSDs, doors will open on the right

=== Platforms ===
Similar to most Paris Metro stations, Cité utilises a side platform setup with two tracks. However, unlike other stations on Line 4, the platforms are 110 m (361 ft) in length, longer than the 90-105m platforms at other stations. This makes it possible for the station to handle seven-car trains. Saint-Michel station, immediately after Cité, has even longer platforms measuring 118 m (387 ft) (making it possible to handle eight-car trains). However, due to the length of other station platforms and the automation process on Line 4, the train length will be limited to six cars.

Because of the station's depth, passengers must walk down to a mezzanine level, which contains ticket machines and fare control gates, and then another three flights of stairs before reaching the platform level. As the Paris Metro runs inversely to normal railways in the rest of France, the eastern track is used by trains heading northbound to Porte de Clignancourt and the western southbound to Montrouge.

=== Bus connections ===
The station area is served by lines 21, 27, 38, 47, 58, 85, 96 and the Paris L'OpenTour tourist line of the RATP bus network and at night, by the N12, N13, N14, N15, N21 and N22 lines of the Noctilien network.

== Gallery ==
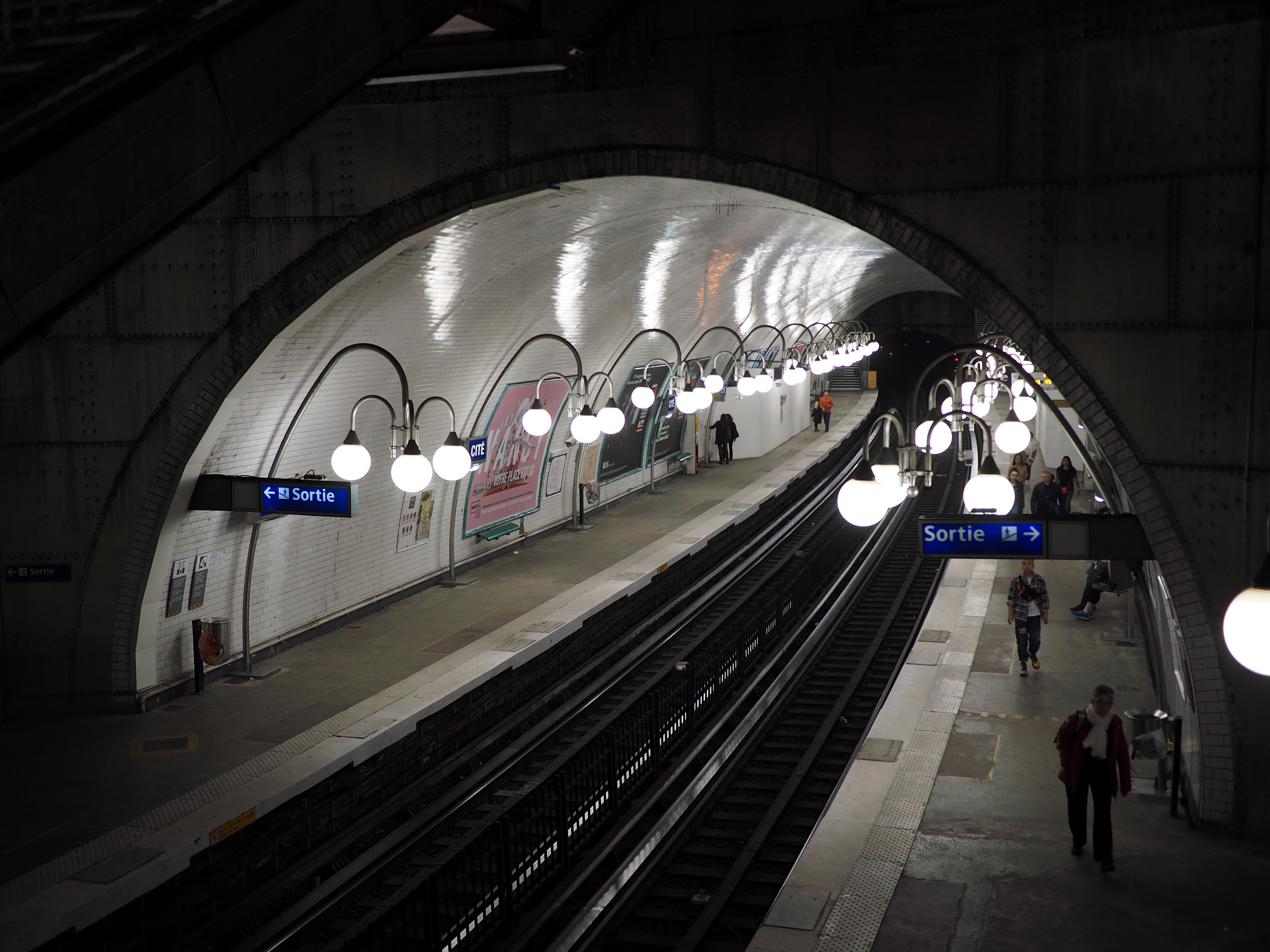
Line 4 platforms at Cité

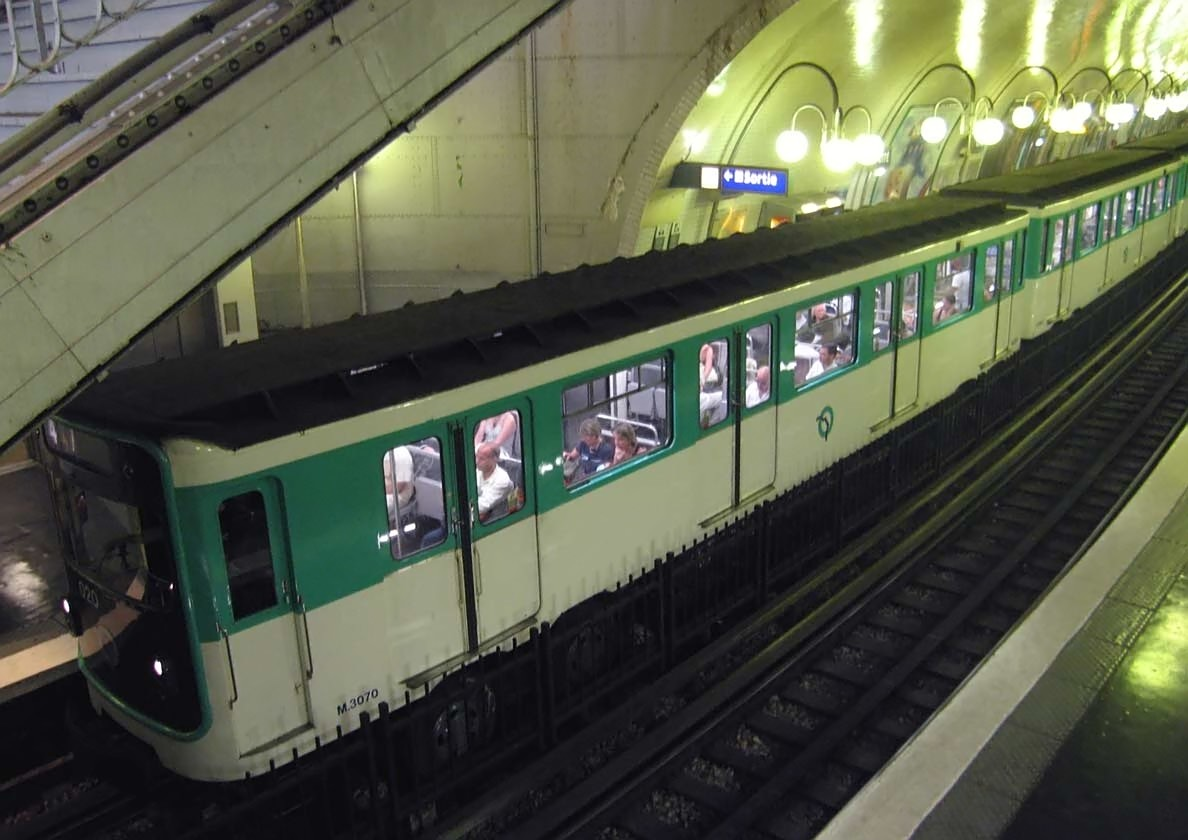
MP 59 rolling stock on Line 4 at Cité

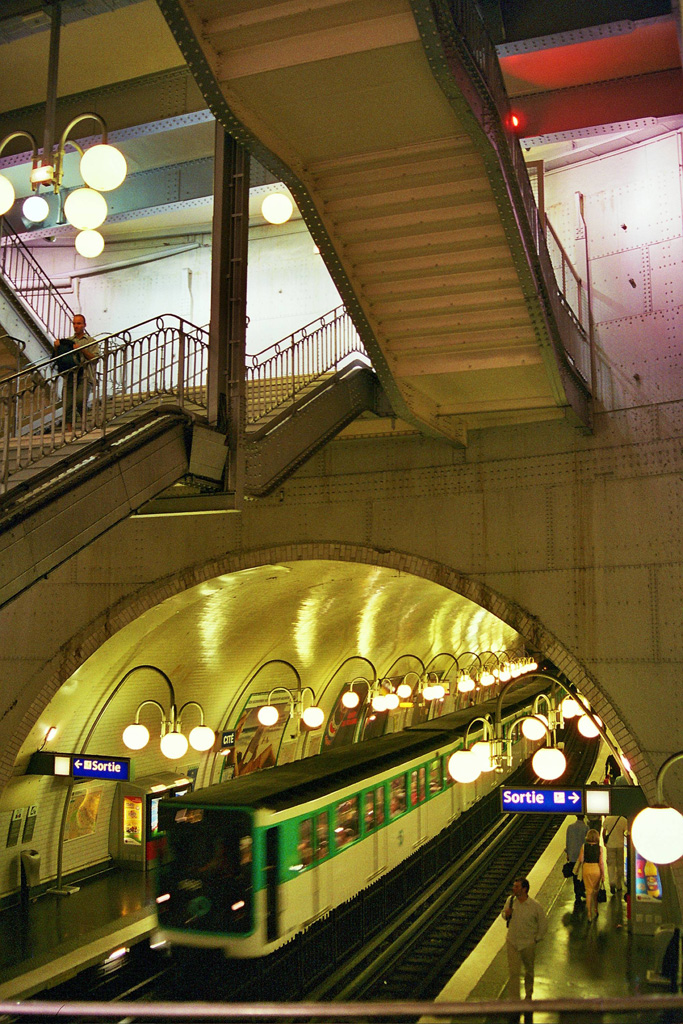
View of platforms with stairs.
