= Place Louis Lépine =

Square in Paris, France

Coordinates: 48.8551°N 2.3469°E

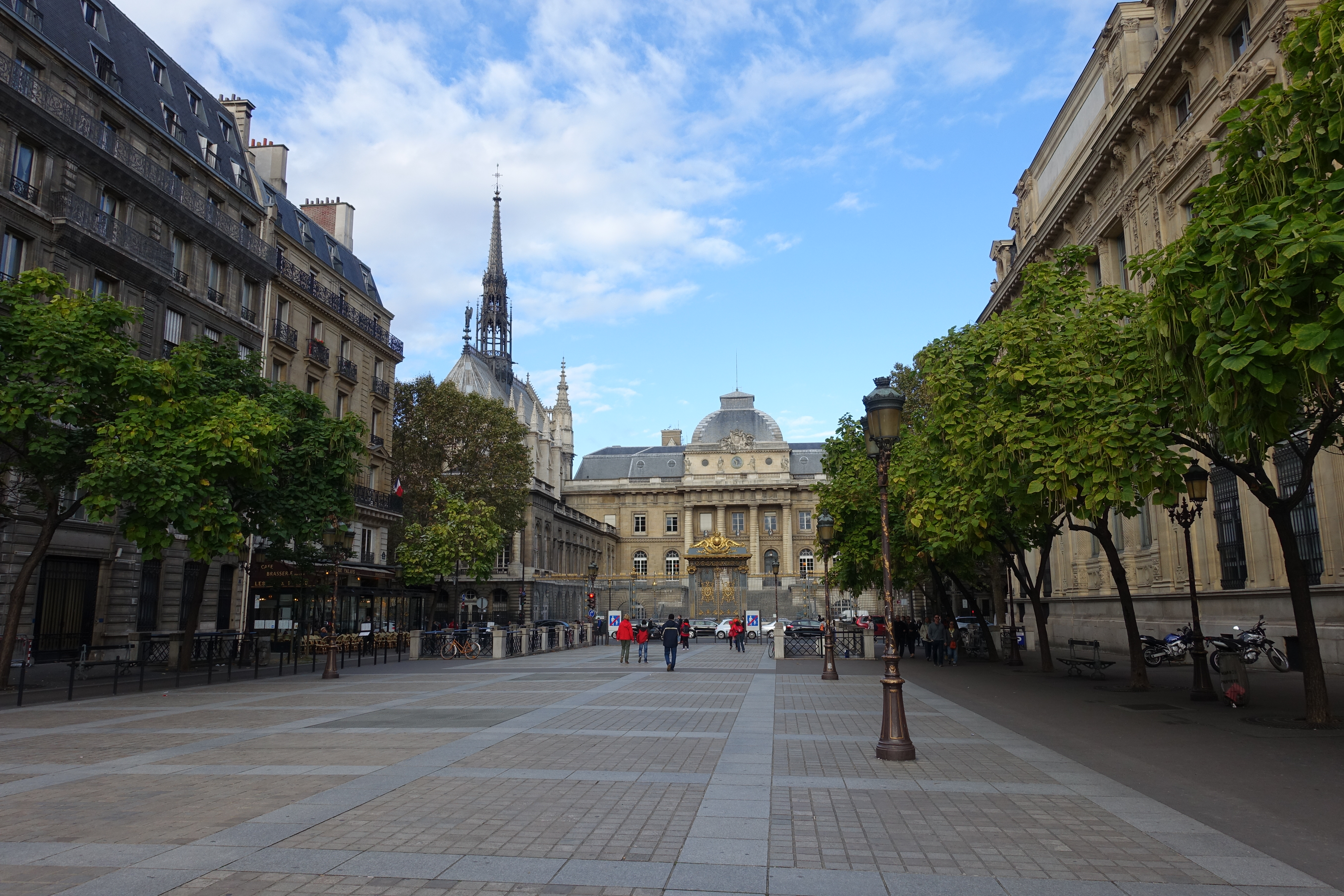
Place Louis-Lépine

The Place Louis-Lépine is an elongated square in the 4th arrondissement of Paris on the île de la Cité. It is bounded by the Rue de la Cité and Hôtel-Dieu to the east; the Rue de Lutèce and Caserne de la Cité to the south; the boulevard du Palais and Palais de la Cité to the east; and the Tribunal de Commerce and Marché aux fleurs to the north.

In 1934, it was named after Louis Lépine, a notable leader of the Paris Police Prefecture which has been housed in the Caserne de la Cité since 1871.

The Metro station Cité has its only entrance on the square.
