= Marché aux fleurs Reine-Elizabeth-II =

Flower market in Paris

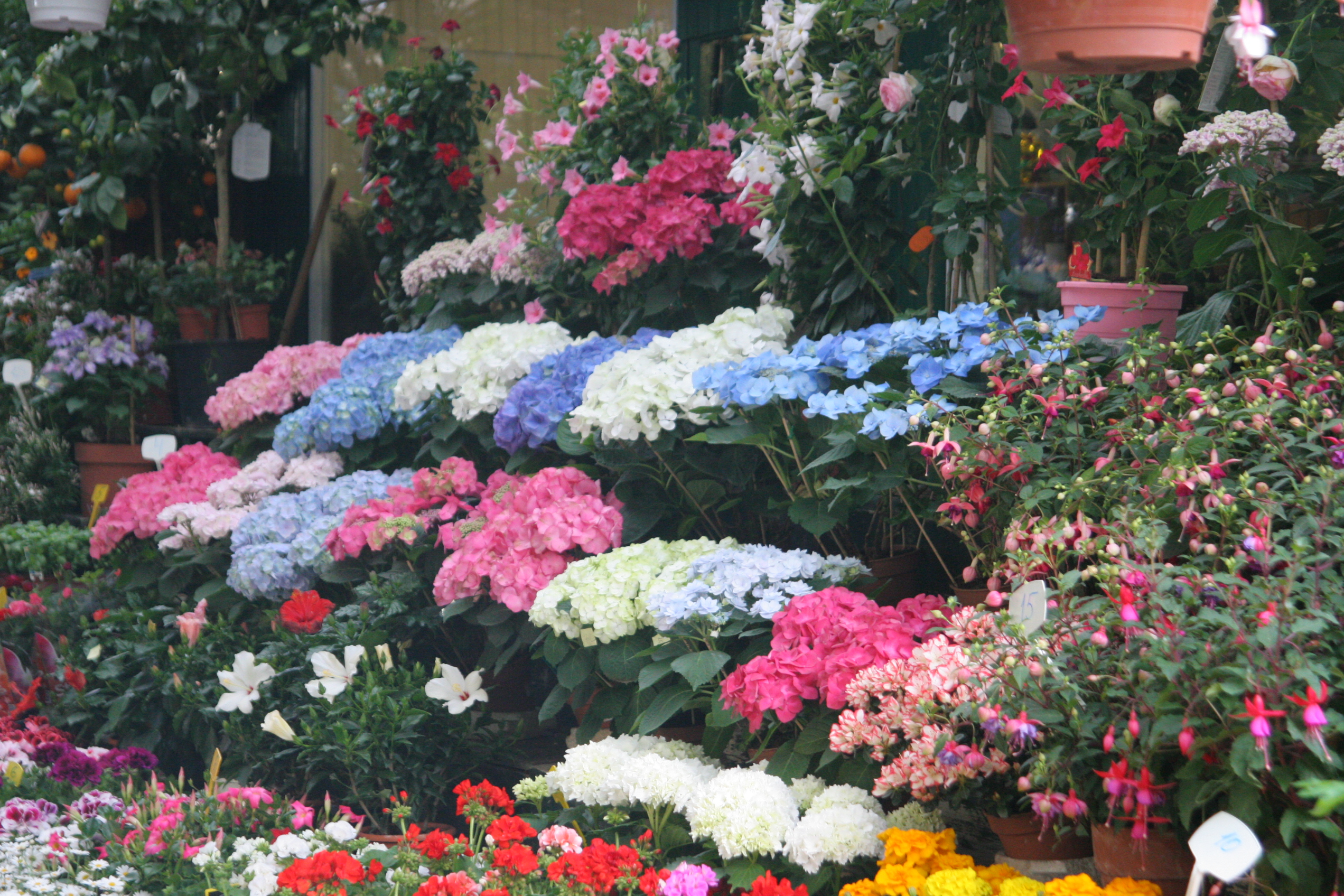
- Location: 75004 Paris 4ème; Place Louis Lépine on the Île de la Cité; 48.8551°N 2.3469°E
- Opening date: 1808
- Environment: Originally outdoors, now in iron pavilions
- Goods sold: Flowers and birds
- Days normally open: Daily with birds only on Sundays
- Interactive map of Marché aux fleurs Reine-Elizabeth-II

The Marché aux fleurs Reine-Elizabeth-II is a flower market in Paris. It was formerly known as the Marché aux fleurs et aux oiseaux Cité but was renamed for Queen Elizabeth II after a state visit in 2014.

It sells caged birds on Sundays but this trade has been forbidden on the grounds of animal welfare and so is expected to cease after a period of renovation and reorganisation scheduled from 2023 to 2025.
