= Alésia station =

Metro station in Paris, France

Alésia
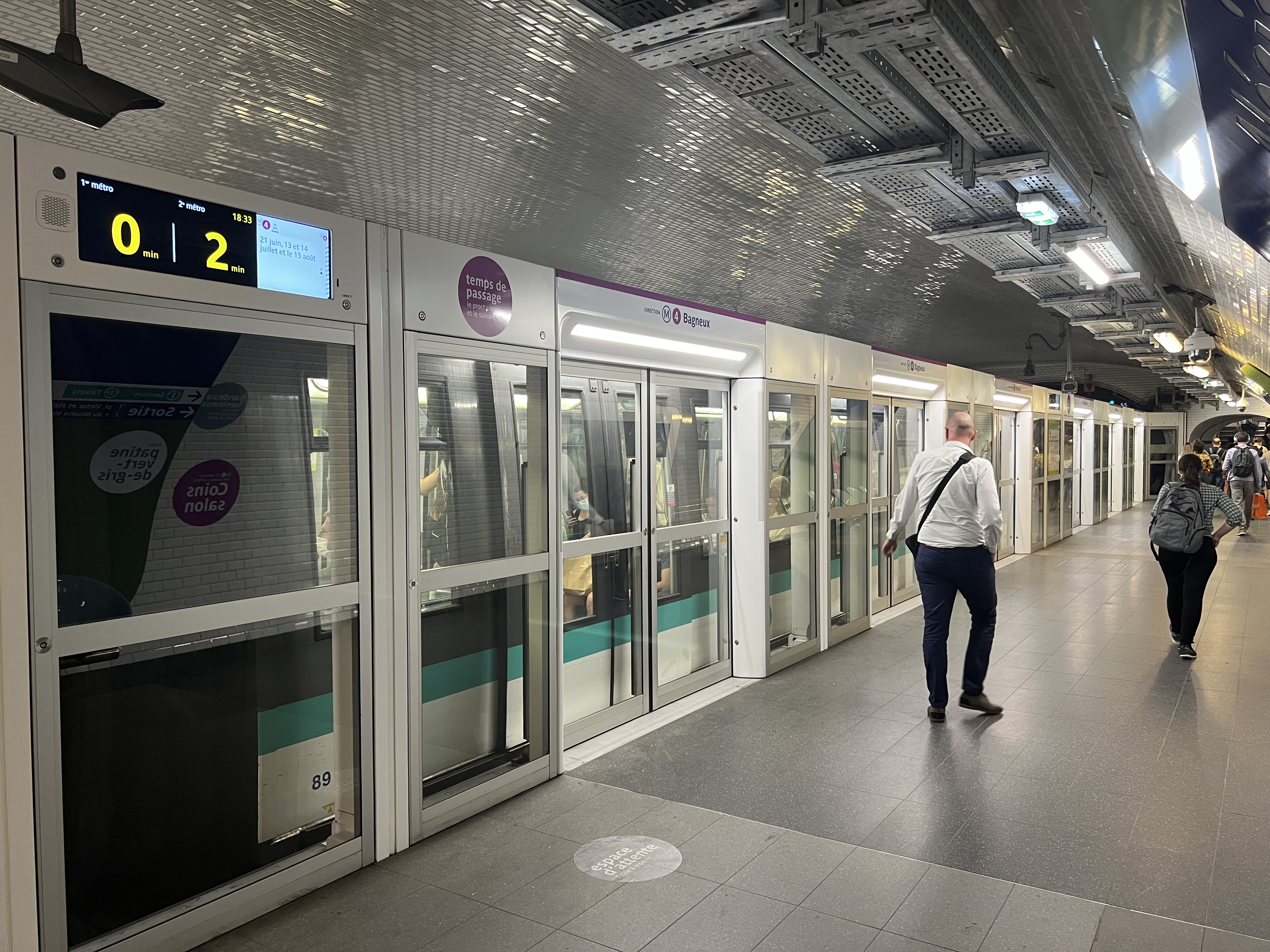
- Alésia with PSDs on 2022

General information
- Location: 73, av. du Général Leclerc; 82, av. du Général Leclerc; 205, av. du Maine; 230, av. du Maine; 14th arrondissement of Paris; Île-de-France; France
- Coordinates: 48°49′42″N 2°19′36″E
- Owner: RATP
- Operator: RATP

Other information
- Fare zone: 1

History
- Opened: 30 October 1909

Services
| Preceding station | Paris Metro | Following station |
|---|---|---|
| Porte d'Orléans towards Bagneux–Lucie Aubrac | Line 4 | Mouton-Duvernet towards Porte de Clignancourt |
Location
- Location within Paris

Alésia (French pronunciation: [alezja]) is a station of the Paris Métro on line 4 in the 14th arrondissement situated in Petit-Montrouge quarter.

== Location ==
The station is located under the Place Victor-et-Hélène-Basch and its surroundings, dominated by the Saint-Pierre-de-Montrouge church. It is located at the intersection of Avenue du Maine, Avenue General Leclerc and Rue d'Alésia, between the Porte d'Orleans and Mouton-Duvernet metro stations.

== History ==
The line 4 platforms were opened on 30 October 1909 when the southern section of the line opened between Raspail and Porte d'Orléans. The name refers to Rue d'Alésia, named for the Battle of Alesia between the Gauls of Vercingetorix and the Romans of Julius Caesar.

Recently this station has been retrofitted with platform screen doors, due to the RATP working on the line 4's automation.

This stop is featured in the animated films The Twelve Tasks of Asterix, in the chapter named Survive the Cave of the Beast. The choice of this station is due to the origin of its name.

It saw 5,113,245 travelers enter in 2018, which places it at the 88th position of metro stations for its usage.

== Passenger services ==
=== Access ===
The station has six entrances:

- Entrance 1: pl. Victor-et-Hélène-Basch: first staircase at 230 avenue du Maine;
- Entrance 2: Rue du Moulin-Vert: second staircase in front of 230 avenue du Maine;
- Entrance 3: av. from Maine: stairs in front of 205 Avenue du Maine, on the west side of Saint-Pierre-de-Montrouge church;
- Entrance 4: Saint-Pierre-de-Montrouge Church: staircase at 82 Avenue du Général-Leclerc, on the east side of the church;
- Entrance 5: av. General-Leclerc: escalator from the platform of the subway direction Porte d'Orleans in front of 82 Avenue du Général-Leclerc;
- Entrance 6: Rue Alésia: staircase in front of 75 Avenue du Général-Leclerc.

=== Station layout ===
Street Level

| B1 | Mezzanine for platform connection |

| Line 4 platform level | Side platforms with PSDs, doors will open on the right |
| Line 4 platform level | Northbound | ← toward Porte de Clignancourt (Mouton-Duvernet) |
| Line 4 platform level | Southbound | toward Bagneux–Lucie Aubrac (Porte d'Orléans) → |
| Line 4 platform level | Side platforms with PSDs, doors will open on the right |

=== Platforms ===
Alésia is a standard configuration station. The platforms are separated by the metro tracks in the center. The walls are curved and the roof is elliptical. The platforms are being worked on as part of the automation of Line 4. Up until 2016, it was laid out in yellow Ouï-dire style with lighting strips, of the same color, supported by fake curved shaped consoles. The direct lighting is white and, contrary to most of the light strips of this style, indirect lighting. The white ceramic tiles are flat and cover the walls, the roof and the tympans. Advertising frames were yellow and cylindrical. The platforms was also equipped with Motte style seats and yellow sit-stand benches.

Since the beginning of 2016, the tiles and the lightning strips of the Ouï-dire platforms were renovated from 11 January 2016 to 30 June 2017. Since November 2018, the station's docks have been completely renovated, fitted with platform screen doors as part of the automation of Line 4.

=== Bus connections ===
The station is served by the Lines 38, 62, 68, 92 and the urban service Lignes de bus Traverses de Paris of the RATP Bus Network and, at night, by the N14, N21 and N66 lines of the Noctilien network.

== Bibliography ==
- Roland, Gérard (2003). Stations de métro. D’Abbesses à Wagram. Éditions Bonneton.
