= Mouton-Duvernet station =

Paris Métro station

Mouton-Duvernet
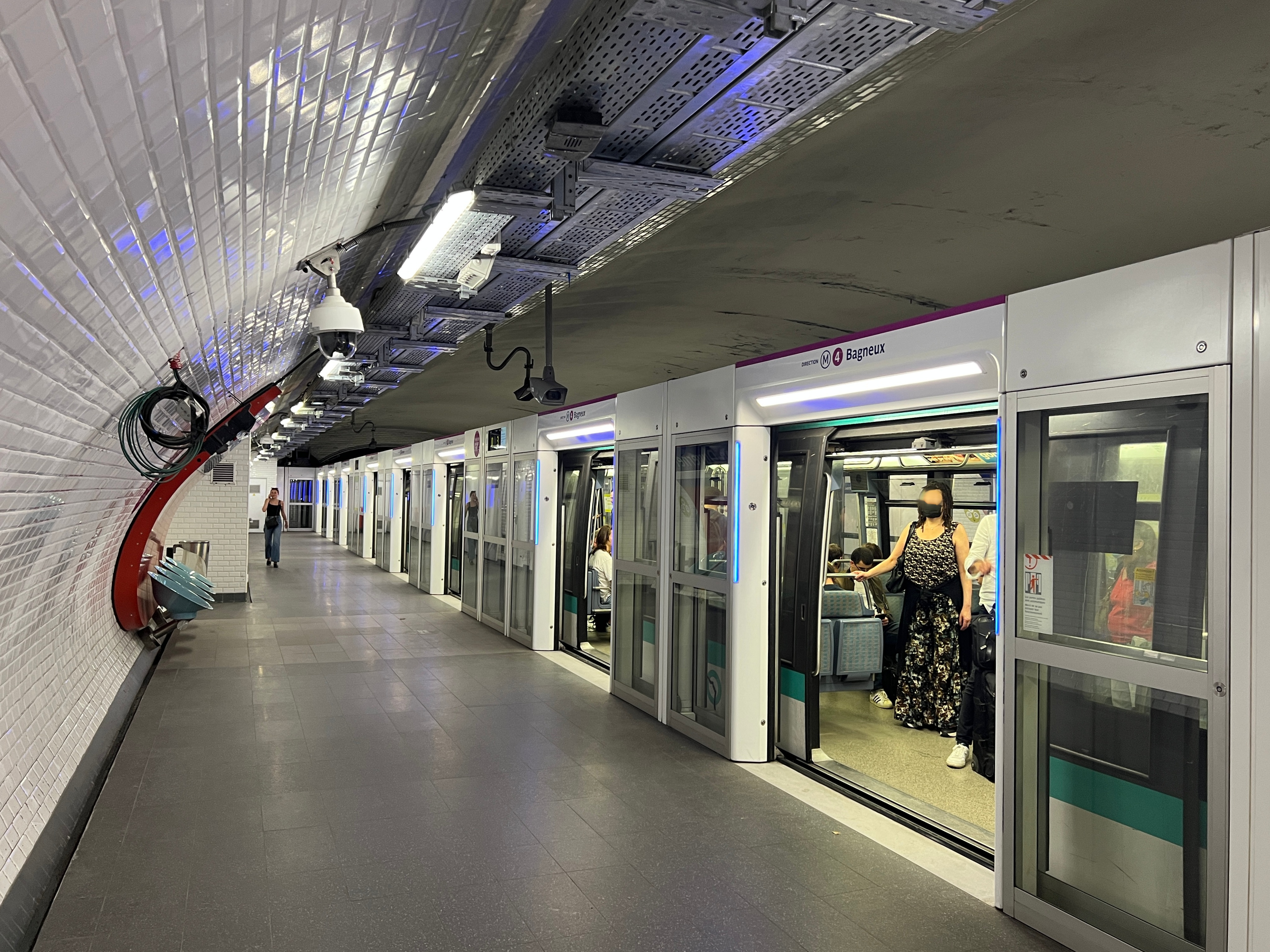
- Mouton-Duvernet station after the installation of Platform screen doors.

General information
- Location: 36, av. du Général Leclerc; 40, av. du Général Leclerc; 42, av. du Général Leclerc; 14th arrondissement of Paris; Île-de-France; France
- Coordinates: 48°49′56″N 2°19′49″E
- Owner: RATP
- Operator: RATP

Other information
- Fare zone: 1

History
- Opened: 30 October 1909

Services
| Preceding station | Paris Metro | Following station |
|---|---|---|
| Alésia towards Bagneux–Lucie Aubrac | Line 4 | Denfert-Rochereau towards Porte de Clignancourt |
Location
- Location within Paris

Mouton-Duvernet (French pronunciation: [mutɔ̃ dyvɛʁnɛ]) is a Paris Métro station on line 4 in Paris' 14th arrondissement.

== Location ==
The station is located on Avenue du Général-Leclerc at Rue Mouton-Duvernet.

== History ==
The line 4 platforms were opened on 30 October 1909 when the southern section of the line opened between Raspail and Porte d'Orléans. The name refers to the Rue Mouton-Duvernet, named after 19th-century general Régis Barthélemy Mouton-Duvernet.

The station was renovated in early 1969 with a new design based on the orange tile, which was nicknamed the Mouton design. Twenty other stations are transformed on the same model during the following years. But it has lost the orange design since 13 March 13, 2007, following its renovation as part of the Renouveau du métro program, as at the Gare de l'Est station on Lines 5 and 7.

The station is now fitted with a set of platform screen doors, due to the RATP working to automate the line 4. The installation start in June 2018 and the installation ended in August 2018.

In 2018, 1,645,671 travelers entered this station which places it at 275th position of metro stations for its usage.

== Passenger services ==
=== Access ===
The station has two entrances in front of nos 36 and 40–42 on Avenue du Général-Leclerc. One of them has a Guimard entrance.

=== Station layout ===
Street Level
| B1 | Mezzanine for platform connection |
| Line 4 platform level | Side platform with PSDs, doors will open on the right |
| Line 4 platform level | Northbound | ← toward Porte de Clignancourt (Denfert-Rochereau) |
| Line 4 platform level | Southbound | toward Bagneux–Lucie Aubrac (Alésia) → |
| Line 4 platform level | Side platform with PSDs, doors will open on the right |

=== Platform ===
Mouton-Duvernet is a standard configuration station: it has two platforms separated by metro tracks and the roof is elliptical.

=== Bus connections ===
The station is served by Lines 38 and 68 of the RATP Bus Network and, at night, by lines N14 and N21 of the Noctilien bus network.

== Gallery ==
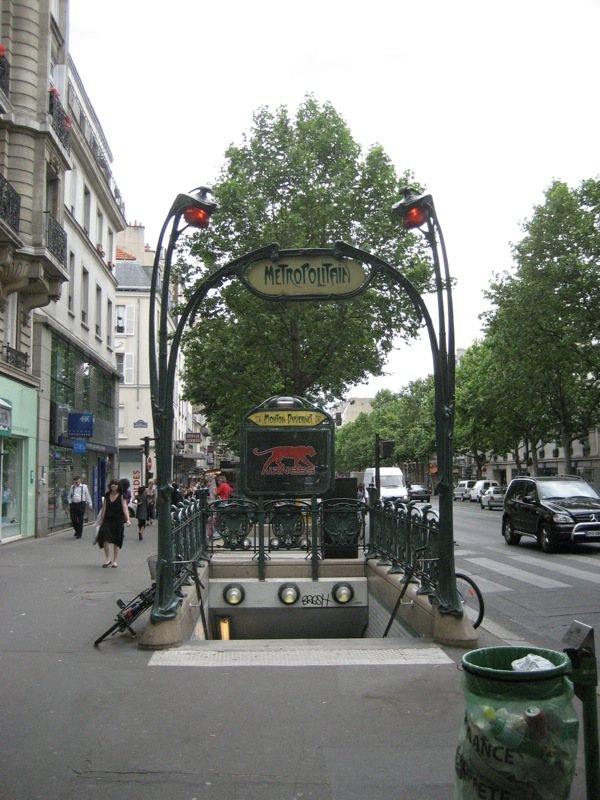
Entrance to the station

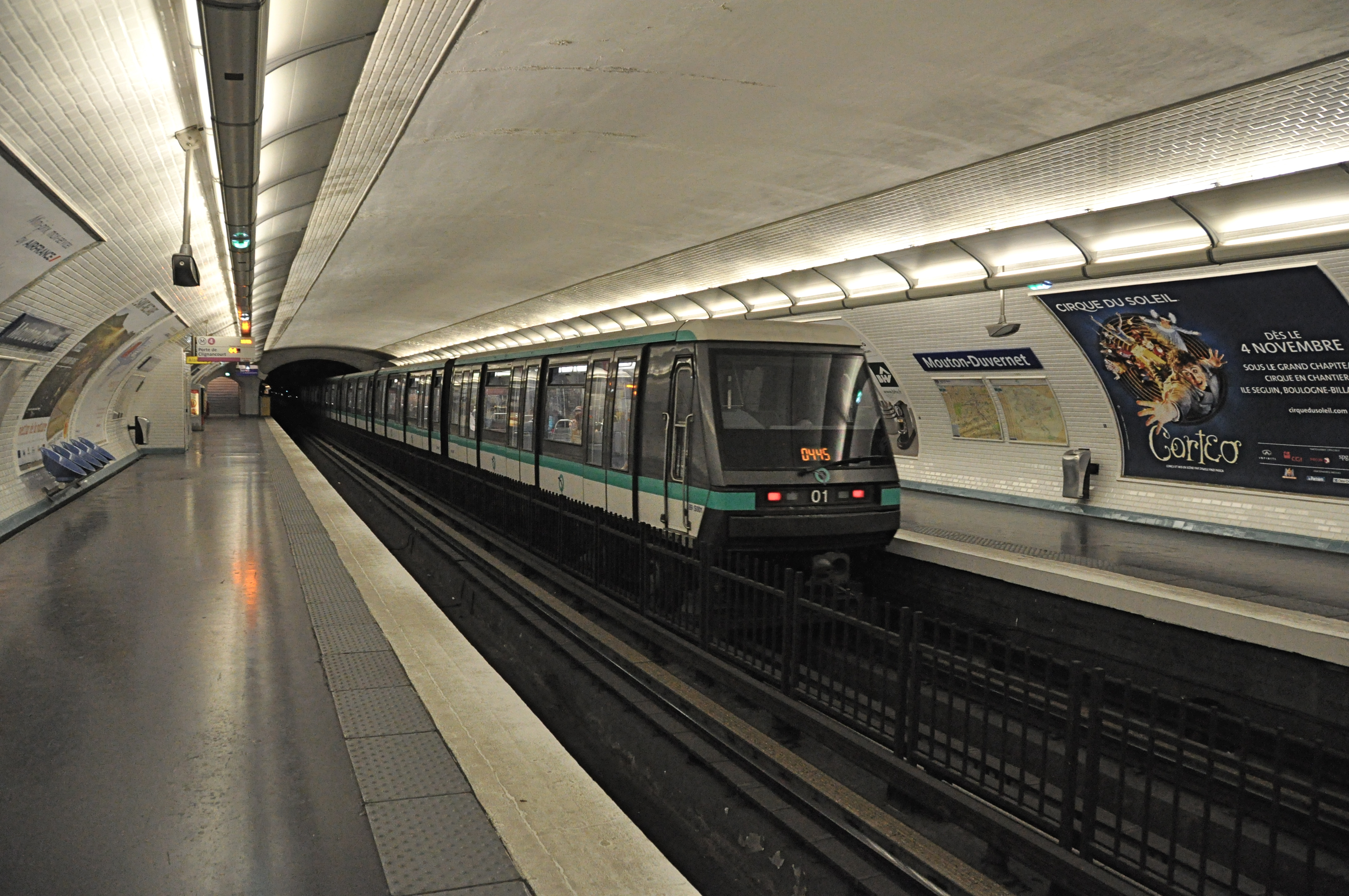
MP 89CC stock train departing
