= Petit-Montrouge =

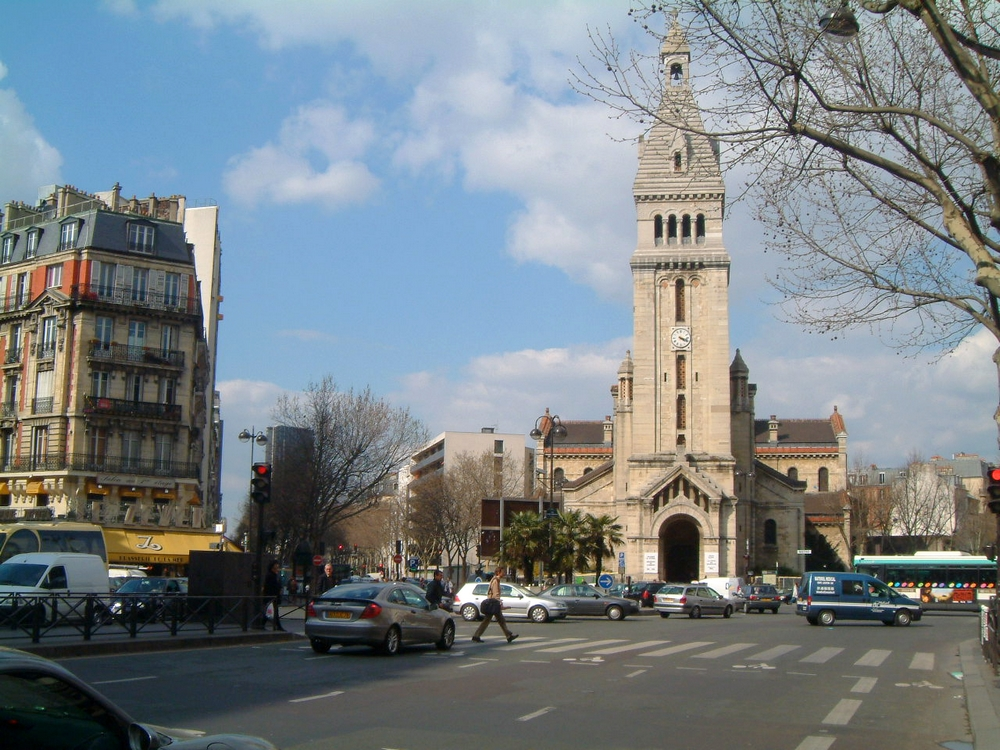
Alésia Square (Carrefour Alésia) and the church Saint-Pierre de Montrouge, at the centre of the quartier du Petit-Montrouge

The quartier du Petit-Montrouge (French pronunciation: [kaʁtje dy pəti mɔ̃ʁuʒ]) is number 55 of the 80 quartiers administratifs (administrative districts) in Paris. It lies in the 14th Arrondissement, in the south of the capital. It owes its name to the adjacent commune of Montrouge, of which it formed a part before 1860. It is familiar as the quartier Alésia, from the name of a street that bisects it and from the principal Métro station that serves it, although the quartier Alésia does not exactly overlap the quartier du Petit-Montrouge.

== Location ==
The quartier du Petit-Montrouge is delimited by Rue Daguerre and Boulevard Saint-Jacques to the north, by Rue de la Tombe-Issoire to the east, by Boulevard Romain Rolland to the south, and Avenue de la Porte de Châtillon and Rue des Plantes and Rue Gassendi to the west.

It is bordered to the north by the quartier du Montparnasse, to the east by the quartier du Parc de Montsouris, to the south by the commune of Montrouge, and to the west by the quartier de Plaisance.

== History ==
The quartier du Petit-Montrouge was created at the same time as the 14th Arrondissement in 1860, when Paris annexed a part of the commune of Montrouge. Montrouge was originally divided into two distinct sectors, Grand-Montrouge (corresponding to the current commune of Montrouge) and Petit-Montrouge, the church housing development launched around 1840, the centre of which is now called Place Michel Audiard. Still at this site today is a building in the French Directory architectural style, which was the old city hall annex of Montrouge (44, rue Du Couédic, 48.83006°N 2.33088°E).

== Geography ==
From a topographical point of view, Petit-Montrouge is situated on a plateau atop the hillsides of the left bank of the Bièvre. Overall it is flat. The centre of the quartier (as well as the centre of the arrondissement) is Place Hélène et Victor Basch, better known as Carrefour Alésia (48.827889°N 2.326816°E). That is the point of convergence of the old routes of Chartres and Orléans, from which the flow of traffic is redistributed to the whole of the left bank of the capital by Rue d'Alésia, Avenue du Maine, and Avenue du Général Leclerc (which constitutes the backbone of the quartier). A network of more or less perpendicular streets serves the entire quartier, testifying to a belated urbanization.

== Urban planning ==
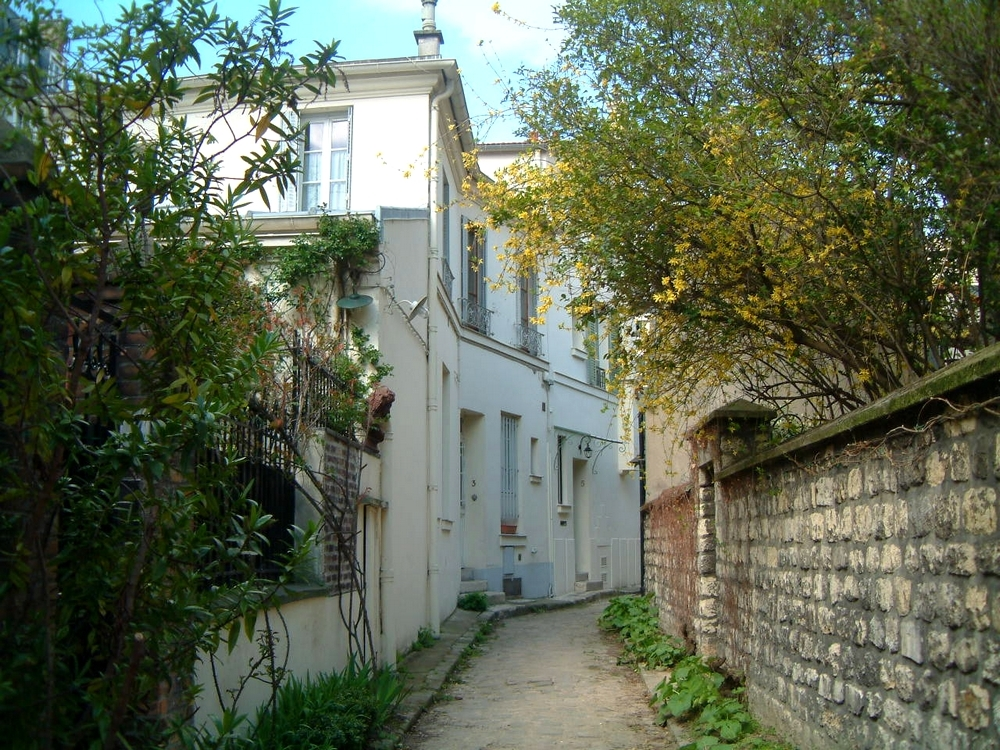
The Hallé villa, residential cul-de-sac typical of the quartier

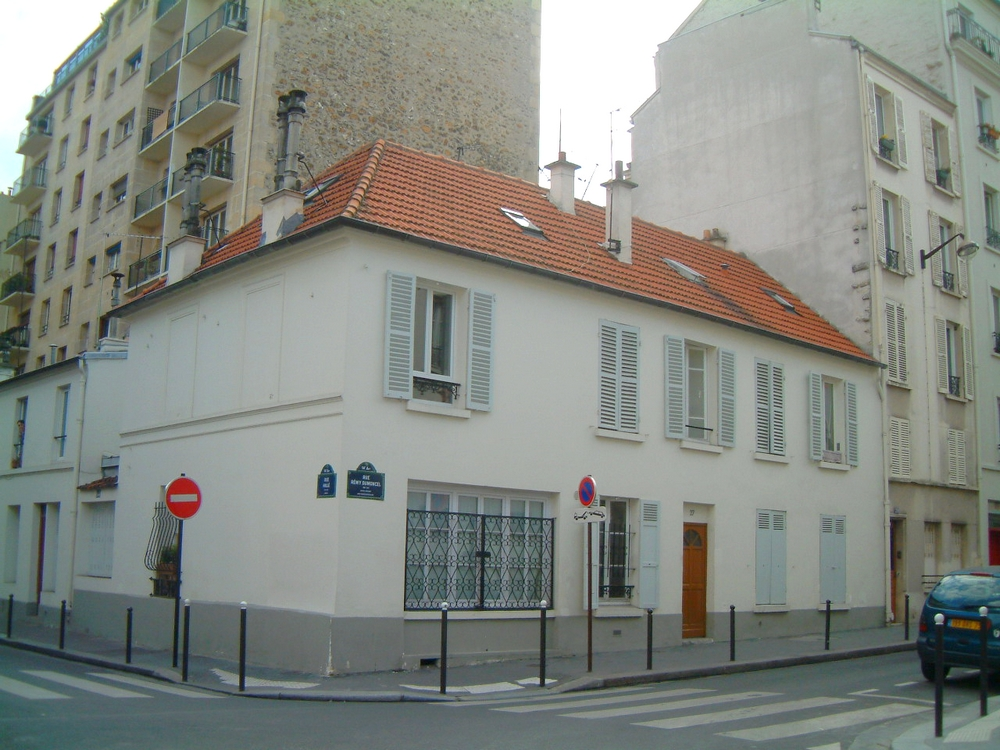
A Faubourgian house predating Haussmann's renovation of Paris

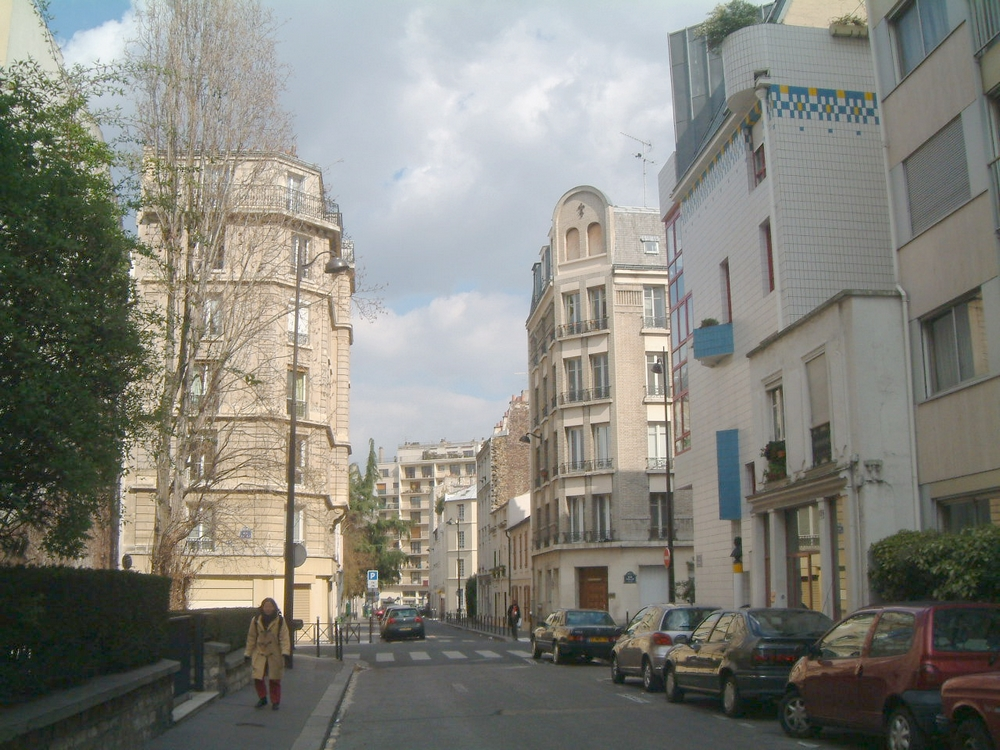
The architectural "melting-pot", Rue Bezout

The belated urbanization of the quartier (after 1840), together with the availability of land, led to a great architectural diversity. The residential areas are composed of buildings of all styles. There is no great number of Haussmanian edifices, the quartier having largely been untouched by Second French Empire urban redevelopment. They are mostly found by the town hall and on Rue Alésia. Entirely Haussmanian streets, like Rue du Lunain, are rather rare. Façades in plaster are more common, testifying to the working class past of the quartier. Buildings of the 1930s are more present in the south, particularly in the ancient zone of fortifications. Finally the post-war architecture is also well represented, for better and for worse. One of the characteristics of the quartier is the importance of the individual home. Many plots were built only in façade, leaving the place for city houses or artists' workshops, often adorned with private gardens, invisible from the street. This type of construction is also found in the dead end streets (the "villas"), occasionally with real architectural treasures. Certain streets, like Rue Bezout, form an authentic architectural museum offering to the visitor a variety of styles, sizes, eras of construction, and volumes. Concentrated in this quartier are also numerous Faubourgian buildings, predating the 1860 annexation, of one or two storeys, rare in the Parisian landscape. Office buildings are almost absent from this residential and shopping quartier, with the notable exception of the extreme south of the quartier, bordering on the commune of Montrouge.

== Social composition ==
Until the 1960s it was a working class quartier, composed primarily of workmen, employees, merchants and members of the middle class. These groups of people arrived in the neighborhood during the Renovation of Paris, led by Napoleon III and the architect and urban planner Georges-Eugène Haussmann. This displacement was a forced migration. The class that suffered most in the past from the medieval living conditions of old Paris was exiled to the suburbs by Haussmannization, since the slums were cleaned up and replaced by apartments for the bourgeoisie. The renovations of the city center entailed a rise in rents that would have forced poor families to move to the outlying districts. Another factor that led to the marginalization of this sector of society was the exponential increase in migration to the city, headed by people belonging to the sector of society already mentioned, and from the agrarian sector, in search of work and a life in civilization. The population moved predominantly to the neighboring neighborhoods of the old wall d'octroi, mainly towards the faubourgs du Temple, Saint-Antoine and Saint-Marceau15 but also in the suburbs, mainly in the communes of Belleville, Ménilmontant, Charonne, Ternes, Montrouge, Vaugirard, and Grenelle. For this reason, Haussmann's work was especially applauded by the wealthy classes, while part of the Parisian people felt that Haussmann's works destroyed their roots and social connections. Since then the quartier has seen a rise in its standard of living, like Paris as a whole. It is today particularly sought-after because of its numerous stores, its parks, its atypical architecture, and the absence of large HLM (rent-controlled housing) complexes.

== Curiosities and points of interest ==
There are no famous monuments in the quartier of Petit-Montrouge. The major tourist attraction is in fact underneath the quartier, since the section of the Catacombs of Paris open to the public is between Place Denfert-Rochereau and Rue Rémy Dumoncel. The quartier is also known for the discount fashion retailers and wholesalers of Rue d'Alésia, with relatively attractive prices, concentrated in great number between Carrefour Alésia and Rue des Plantes. Carrefour Alésia, an obligatory point of passage between the southern suburbs and the centre of Paris, is also well known by drivers for its traffic congestion.

The east sector of the quartier was recently made the object of a pilot development, named quartier vert, consisting principally of reducing automobile traffic, in favour of non-polluting modes of travel and highlighting the vegetational heritage. This experiment, subsequently extended to other quartiers of Paris, is diversely welcomed by residents, drivers, and retailers.

The Ateliers catholiques, a publishing house and in its final years the largest privately held printing press in France, was founded in Petit-Montrouge in 1836 by the priest Jacques Paul Migne. This firm published numerous religious works in rapid succession and at modest prices, ensuring their wide circulation to the lesser clergy and the laity. Its premises were destroyed by a fire on 12–13 February 1868.

== Public transportation ==
- RER B: Denfert-Rochereau
- Paris Métro, Line 4: Denfert-Rochereau, Mouton-Duvernet, Alésia, and Porte d'Orléans
- Paris Métro, Line 6: Denfert-Rochereau
- Tramway: Porte d'Orléans
