= Barbara station =

Metro station in Montrouge and Bagneux, France

Barbara Montrouge
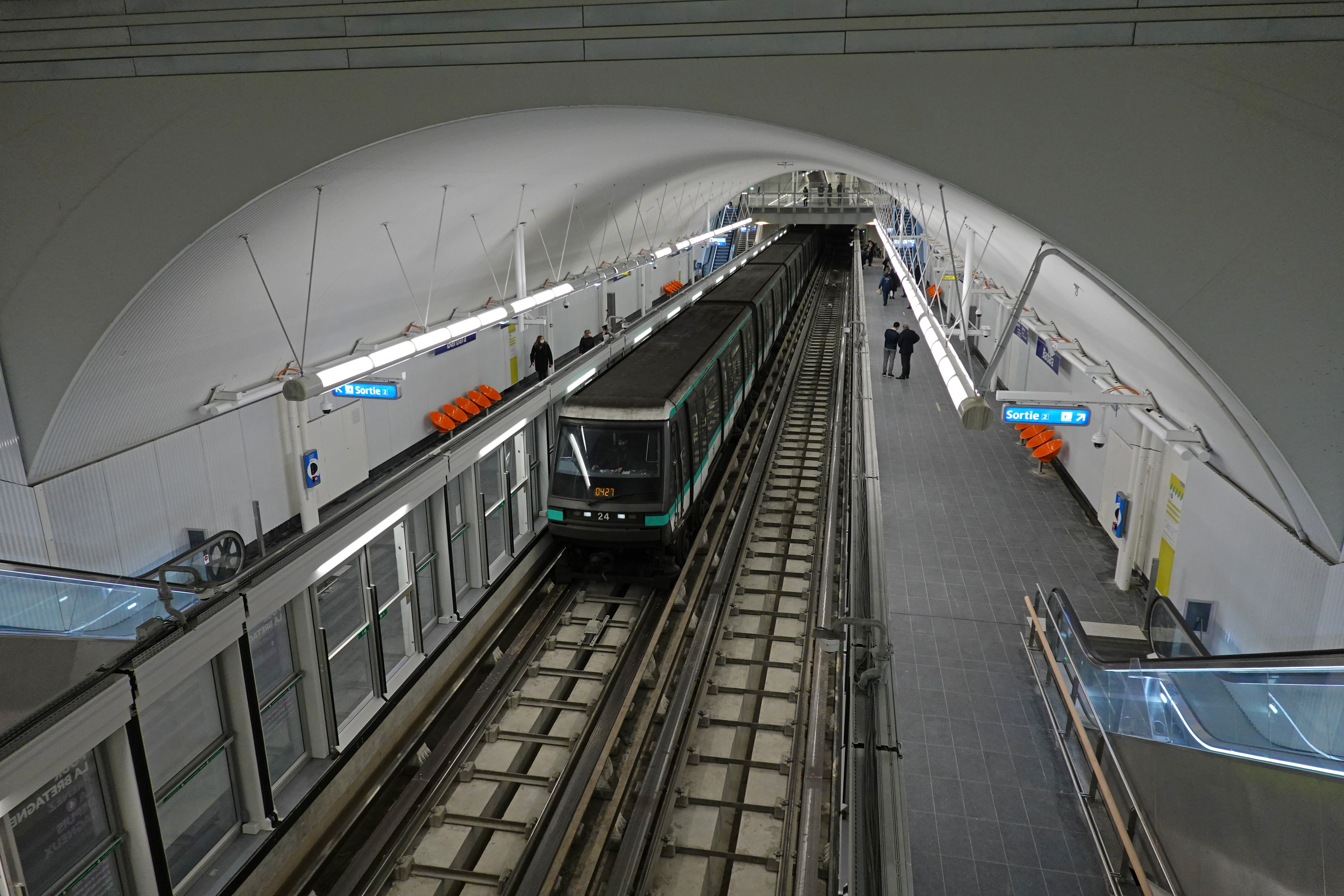
- Station platforms on opening day

General information
- Location: Montrouge and Bagneux; Île-de-France; France
- Coordinates: 48°48′33″N 2°19′03″E
- System: Paris Metro station
- Owner: RATP
- Operator: RATP
- Line: Paris Metro Paris Metro Line 4
- Platforms: 2 (side platforms)
- Tracks: 2

Construction
- Accessible: yes
- Architect: LIN (Finn Geipel and Giulia Andi)

Other information
- Fare zone: 1

History
- Opened: 13 January 2022

Services
| Preceding station | Paris Metro | Following station |
|---|---|---|
| Bagneux–Lucie Aubrac Terminus | Line 4 | Mairie de Montrouge towards Porte de Clignancourt |
Location
- Location within Paris

Barbara (French pronunciation: [baʁbaʁa]) is a station on Line 4 of the Paris Metro on the border between the southern inner suburbs of Montrouge and Bagneux. The station was built as part of a two-station southward extension from Mairie de Montrouge to Bagneux–Lucie Aubrac. It opened on 13 January 2022. It is named after singer Barbara (1930–1997).

== History ==
The extension of Line 4 south from Mairie de Montrouge received a déclaration d'utilité publique in February 2005. Work to build the extension began in 2015, and was originally planned to open in 2020. During the planning stages of the extension, the station was tentatively called Verdun-Sud. Following a public vote, the station was named after French singer Barbara, who was buried in the nearby Cimetière parisien de Bagneux.

The station was opened on 13 January 2022. The extension is expected to bring 37,000 new passengers per day. The cost of the extension was €406 million, split between the Île-de-France region (60%), the State (25.7%), and the Hauts-de-Seine department (14.3%).

An apartment building for young workers was built by RATP Habitat above the station entrance at Avenue Marx Dormoy, and was completed in February 2023.

== Architecture ==
The station was designed by LIN (Finn Geipel and Giulia Andi). The design uses white corrugated metal panels on the walls and vaulted ceiling, as well as large circular light fittings – a similar concept was also used at Aimé Césaire and Mairie d'Aubervilliers stations on Line 12.

== Passenger services ==
=== Access ===
The station has two entrances:

- Access 1 - "Avenue Marx Dormoy" is located on the territory of Montrouge, along Avenue Marx-Dormoy, at the corner of Avenue de Verdun and Avenue Henri Ginoux. The entrance is located on the ground floor of an apartment building for young workers.
- Access 2 - "Avenue de Stalingrad" is located on the territory of Bagneux, at the corner of Avenue de Stalingrad and Avenue du Colonel-Fabien. The entrance is a standalone building.

=== Platform ===
The platform is fitted with platform edge doors, installed as part of the automation of Line 4.

=== Other services ===
The station connects with lines 128 and 323 of the RATP bus network.

== Nearby ==
- Cimetière parisien de Bagneux
- Fort de Montrouge
