= Raspail station =

Metro station in Paris, France

Raspail
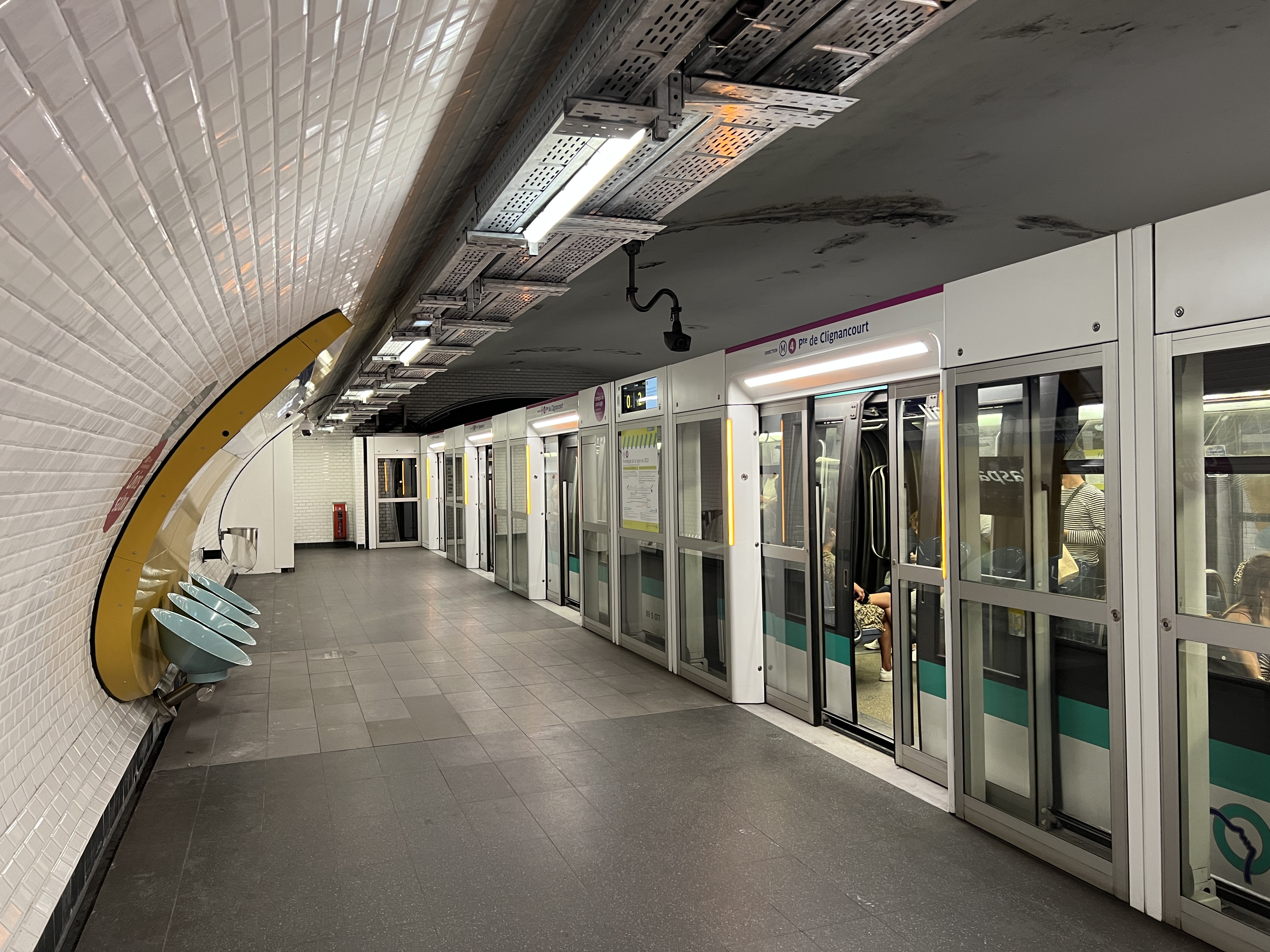
- Line 4 platforms at Raspail after to the installation of platform screen doors.

General information
- Location: 233–234 Boulevard Raspail; 14th arrondissement of Paris; Île-de-France; France
- Coordinates: 48°50′21″N 2°19′50″E
- Owner: RATP
- Operator: RATP
- Line: Paris Metro Paris Metro Line 4 Paris Metro Line 6
- Platforms: 4 (side platforms)
- Tracks: 4

Construction
- Accessible: no

Other information
- Fare zone: 1

History
- Opened: 24 April 1906 (Line 6); 30 October 1909 (Line 4)

Services
Preceding station	Paris Metro	Following station
Denfert-Rochereau towards Bagneux–Lucie Aubrac	Line 4	Vavin towards Porte de Clignancourt
Edgar Quinet towards Charles de Gaulle–Étoile	Line 6	Denfert-Rochereau towards Nation
Location
- Location within Paris

Raspail (French pronunciation: [ʁaspaj]) is a station on Lines 4 and 6 of the Paris Métro. It is in the 14th arrondissement under Boulevard Raspail. The station is now fitted with platform screen doors on its Line 4 platforms, installed ahead of the line's full automation in 2023.

== Location ==
The station is located under Boulevard Raspail at the intersection with Boulevard Edgar-Quinet.

== Name ==
The station is named after the Boulevard Raspail, named after 19th-century scientist and statesman François-Vincent Raspail.

== History ==
The station opened on 24 April 1906 with the opening of the extension of line 2 Sud from Passy to Place d'Italie. On 14 October 1907, line 2 Sud became part of line 5. On 12 October 1942, the section of line 5 between Étoile and Place d'Italie, including Raspail was transferred from line 5 to line 6 in order to separate the underground and elevated sections of the metro (because the latter were more vulnerable to air attack during World War II). The line 4 platforms were opened on 30 October 1909 when the southern section of line 4 was opened between Raspail and Porte d'Orléans; this was temporarily separated from the section of line 4 opened on 21 April 1908 between Châtelet and Porte de Clignancourt. On 9 January 1910, the connecting section opened under the Seine between Châtelet and Raspail, completing line 4.

The station was renovated a first time after 1969 by adopting the style Mouton-Duvernet two-tone orange, cutting radically with the dominant white of the original metro. The station was renovated a second time in 2008 as part of the Renouveau du métro program and loses its Mouton style decoration and its orange tiles. The new furniture was blue on Line 6 and water green on Line 4. In 2017, new modifications were applied to the platforms of Line 4, as part of the future automation of the line.

In 2018, 1,995,962 travelers entered this station (connecting passengers between the two metro lines were not taken into account) which places it at the 259th position of the metro stations for its attendance.

== Passenger services ==
=== Access ===
The station has two entrances in front of nos. 234 and 241 of the Boulevard Raspail.

=== Station layout ===
Street Level

B1	Mezzanine for platform connection

Line 4 platform level	Side platform with platform screen doors, doors will open on the right
Line 4 platform level	Northbound	← toward Porte de Clignancourt (Vavin)
Line 4 platform level	Southbound	toward Bagneux–Lucie Aubrac (Denfert-Rochereau) →
Line 4 platform level	Side platform with platform screen doors, doors will open on the right

Line 6 platform level	Side platform, doors will open on the right
Line 6 platform level	Westbound	← toward Charles de Gaulle–Étoile (Edgar Quinet)
Line 6 platform level	Eastbound	toward Nation (Denfert-Rochereau) →
Line 6 platform level	Side platform, doors will open on the right

=== Platforms ===
The platforms of the two lines are parallel and located at the same level. The platforms in the direction of Mairie de Montrouge and Charles de Gaulle–Étoile are connected to each other by two passages, offering a direct connection. The platforms of the two lines are of standard configuration. They are separated by the metro tracks located in the centre and the roofs of each line are elliptical. They are decorated in the style used for most of the metro stations. White ceramic bevelled tiles cover the walls, the tunnel exits and the outlets of the corridors. The roofs are coated and painted white, and the name of the station is in the Parisine font on enamelled plates. On the platforms of line 6, the lighting strip is white and rounded in the Gaudin style of the metro revival of the 2000s, the advertising frames are a white ceramic, and the seats are in Akiko blue style. On Line 4, the metro is automated, there are no more banners, advertising frames, advertising, or seats. After the successful experiment of the Line 14, the RATP started to look forward to automating existing lines. After completely automating line 1, the RATP started focusing on the Line 4. Because of that, Raspail was fitted with platform screen doors and were installed in September and October 2018.

=== Bus connections ===
The station is served by Line 68 of the RATP bus network.

== Nearby ==
Nearby are the Fondation Cartier pour l'Art Contemporain (contemporary art museum), the École Spéciale d'Architecture (architecture school) and the Montparnasse Cemetery.

== Gallery ==
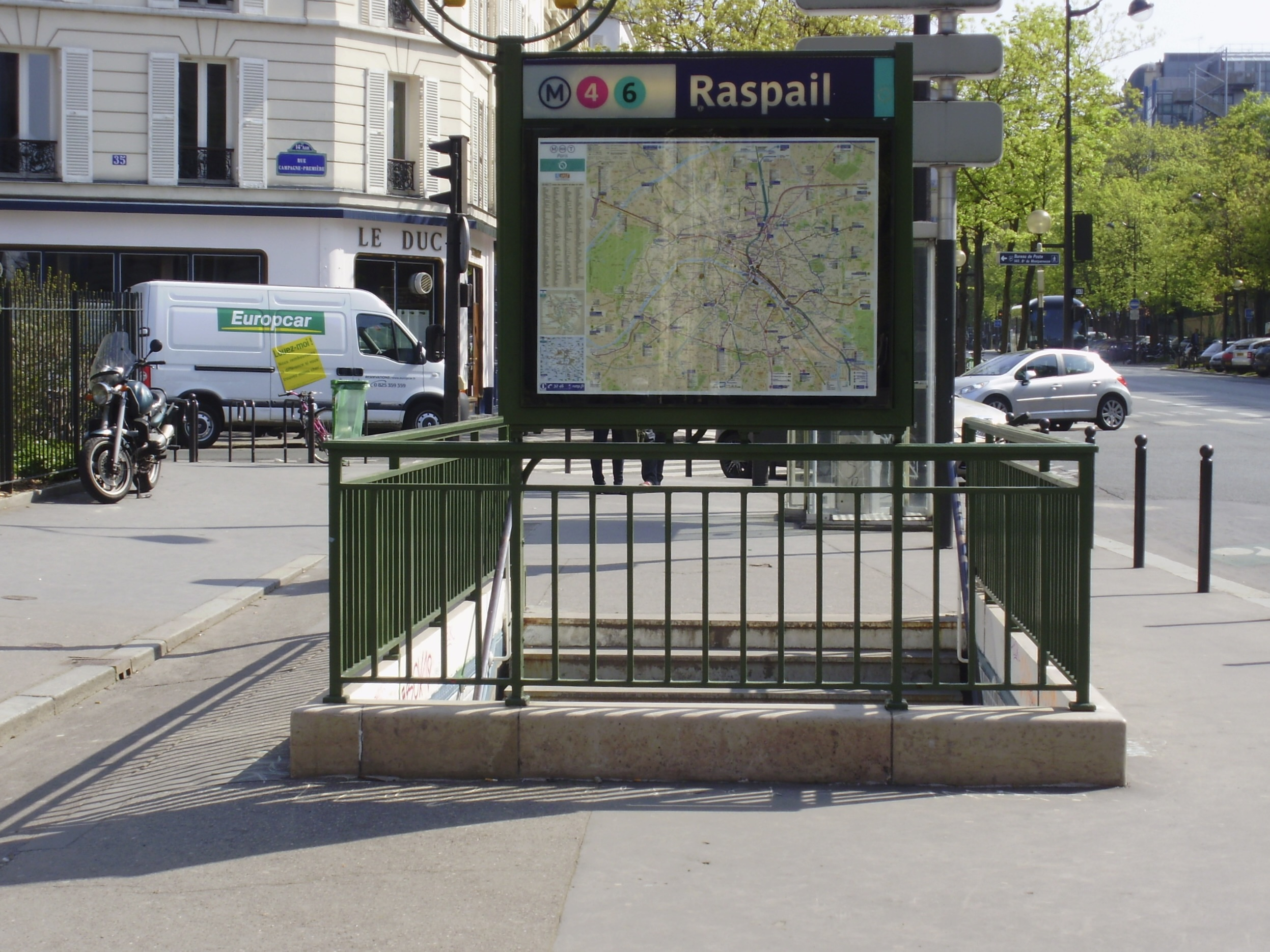
Street-level entrance at Raspail

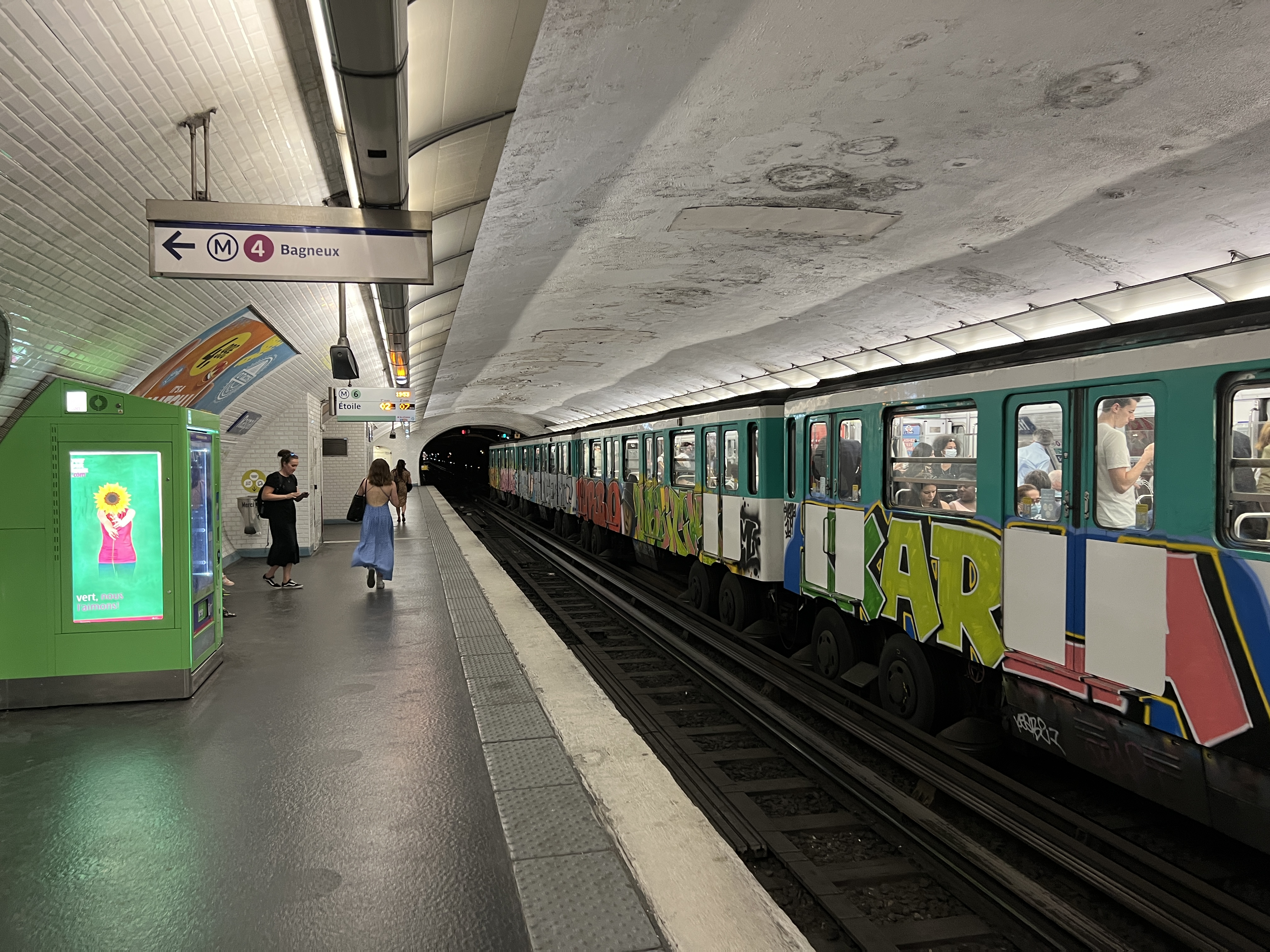
Line 6 platforms at Raspail
