= Denfert-Rochereau station (Paris Metro) =

Metro station in Paris, France

Denfert-Rochereau Colonel Rol-Tanguy
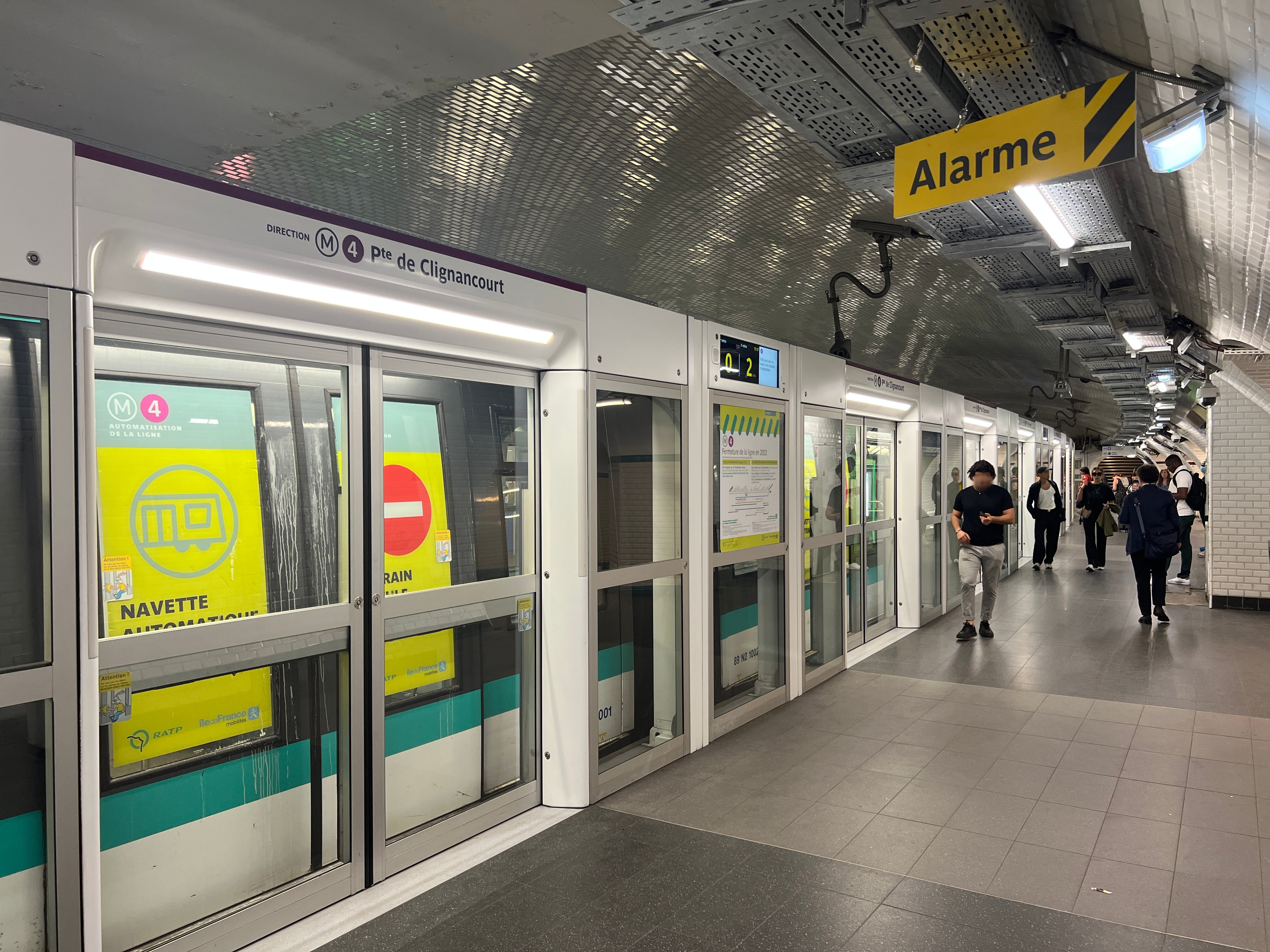
- MP 89 CA on Line 4 during their tests at Denfert-Rochereau, after the Installation of Platform Screen Doors

General information
- Location: 2, pl. Denfert-Rochereau; 3, pl. Denfert-Rochereau; 1, av. du Général Leclerc; 2, av. du Général Leclerc; 4, av. du Général Leclerc; 14th arrondissement of Paris; Île-de-France; France
- Coordinates: 48°50′02″N 2°19′58″E
- Owner: RATP
- Operator: RATP

Other information
- Fare zone: 1

History
- Opened: 24 April 1906 (Line 6); 30 October 1909 (Line 4)

Services
Preceding station	Paris Metro	Following station
Mouton-Duvernet towards Bagneux–Lucie Aubrac	Line 4	Raspail towards Porte de Clignancourt
Raspail towards Charles de Gaulle–Étoile	Line 6	Saint-Jacques towards Nation
Connections to other stations
Preceding station	RER	Following station
Port-Royal towards Aéroport Charles de Gaulle 2 TGV or Mitry–Claye	RER B transfer at Denfert-Rochereau	Cité Universitaire towards Robinson or Saint-Rémy-lès-Chevreuse
Location
- Location within Paris

Denfert-Rochereau (French pronunciation: [dɑ̃fɛʁ ʁɔʃʁo]) is a station on the Paris Métro in France. An adjacent station with the same name is served by RER B.

== Location ==
The station is located under Place Denfert-Rochereau, the platforms being:

- Line 4 – curved and approximately north–south, along the axis of Avenue du Général-Leclerc (between Raspail and Mouton-Duvernet stations);
- Line 6 – also on a curve partly under Line 4 and oriented northwest–southeast, along the axis of Boulevard Raspail on the one hand and Boulevard Saint-Jacques on the other (between Raspail and Saint-Jacques, preceding an overhead section towards Nation).

== Name ==
The name of the station refers to Place Denfert-Rochereau, named for the 19th‑century general Pierre Philippe Denfert-Rochereau, who led the resistance of Belfort to a siege during the Franco-Prussian War. The first part of the name is identical in pronunciation to its former name of Place d'Enfer ("Place of Hell"). It is the location of the Barrière d’Enfer, a gate built for the collection of taxation as part of the Wall of the Farmers-General; the gate was built between 1784 and 1788 and is one of only four of the 55 gates with any surviving remains. The station is sub-titled Colonel Rol-Tanguy, after Henri Rol-Tanguy, a leader in the French Resistance during World War II.

== History ==
The station opened on 24 April 1906 with the opening of the extension of line 2 Sud from Passy to Place d'Italie. On 14 October 1907 line 2 Sud became part of line 5. On 12 October 1942 the section of line 5 between Étoile and Place d'Italie, including Denfert-Rochereau, was transferred from line 5 to line 6 in order to separate the underground and elevated sections of the metro (because the latter were more vulnerable to air attack during World War II). The line 4 platforms were opened on 30 October 1909 when the southern section of line 4 was opened between Raspail and Porte d'Orléans.

== Passenger services ==
=== Access ===
The station has three entrances divided into four subway points, all of which consist of fixed stairs:

- Entrance 1 Place Denfert-Rochereau – the Catacombs of Paris, adorned with a Guimard edicule, it was registered as a historic monument on 12 February 2016, leads to the right of No. 2 Avenue Colonel-Henri-Rol-Tanguy;
- Entrance 2 Rue Daguerre – consisting of two entrances established back-to-back on the even sidewalk of Avenue du Général-Leclerc, the most southerly, embellished with a mast with a yellow "M" in one circle is opposite No. 4 while the other is on the right of No. 2;
- Entrance 3 Avenue du Général-Leclerc – also with a yellow "M" totem, leading to building No. 1.

In addition, the station had in the past a fourth access, now condemned, to the right of No. 11 Place Denfert-Rochereau.

=== Station layout ===
Street Level

B1	Mezzanine for platform connection

Line 4 platform level	Side platform with PSDs, doors will open on the right
Line 4 platform level	toward Porte de Clignancourt	← toward Porte de Clignancourt (Raspail)
Line 4 platform level	toward Bagneux–Lucie Aubrac	toward Bagneux–Lucie Aubrac (Mouton-Duvernet) →
Line 4 platform level	Side platform with PSDs, doors will open on the right

Line 6 platform level	Side platform, doors will open on the right
Line 6 platform level	toward Charles de Gaulle – Étoile	← toward Charles de Gaulle – Étoile (Raspail)
Line 6 platform level	toward Nation	toward Nation (Saint-Jacques) →
Line 6 platform level	Side platform, doors will open on the right

=== Platforms ===
The platforms of the two lines, established on a curve, each with two platforms separated by the tracks of the metro and the roof is elliptic. The platforms of Line 6 are arranged in the Andreu-Motte style with two orange luminous railing, benches, tunnel exits and outlets of the flat brown tile corridors and Motte orange seats. It is therefore one of the few stations still presenting the Andreu-Motte style in its entirety. This arrangement is paired with the white bevelled ceramic tiles, which cover the walls and the vault. The advertising frames are metallic, and the name of the station is written in capital letters on enamelled plates. In 2017, the platforms of Line 4 were under construction.

=== Bus and other connections ===
The station is served by lines 38, 59, 64, 68, 88, and 216 of the RATP Bus Network and, at night, by the N14, N21 and N122 lines of the Noctilien network.

The station is also connected to the RER B at the Denfert-Rochereau station. This station, opened in 1846, was initially the northern terminus of the Ligne de Sceaux.

== Gallery ==
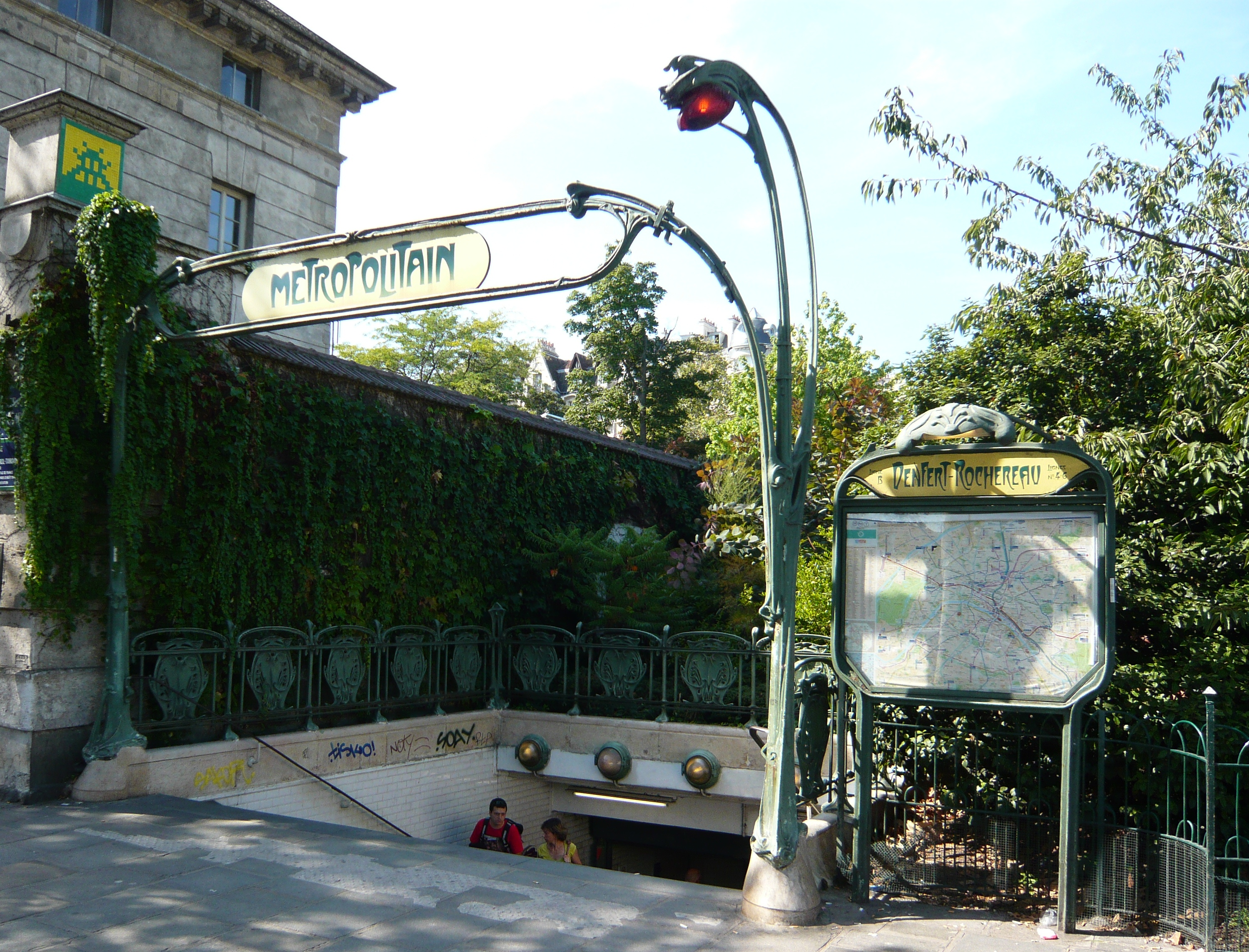
Entrance at Denfert-Rochereau

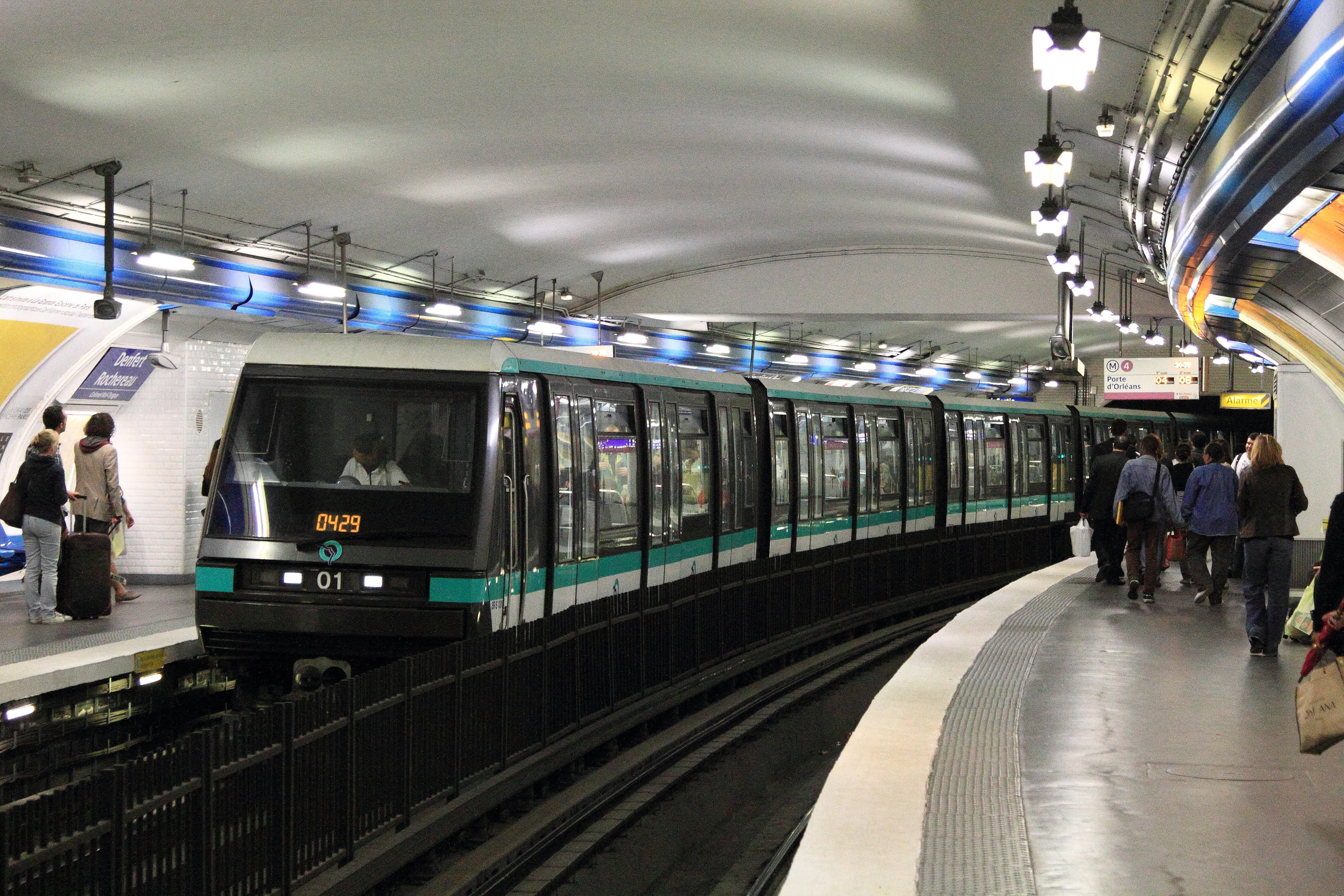
MP 89 CC stock train arriving in the northbound direction

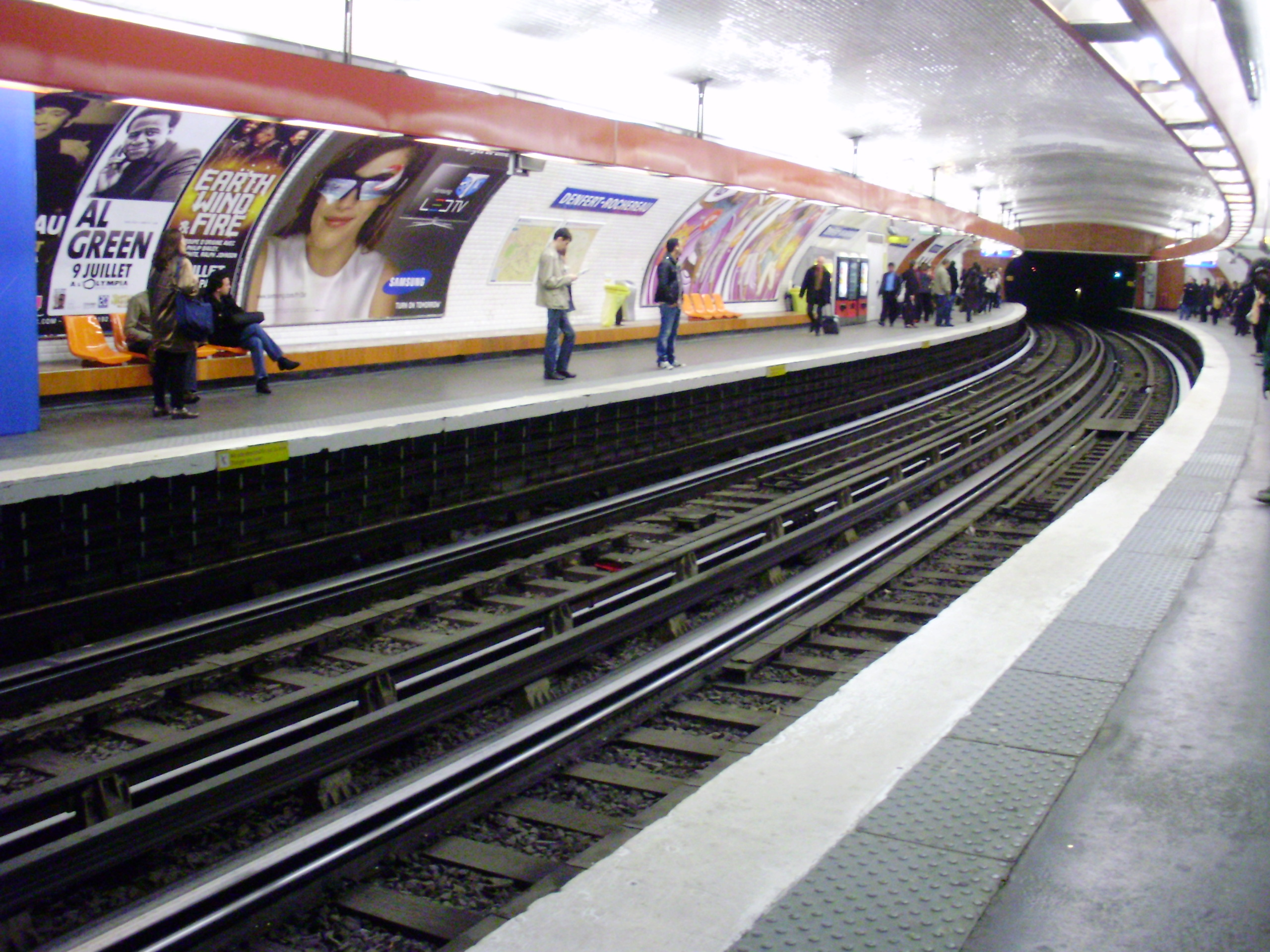
Line 6 platforms at Denfert-Rochereau
