= Denfert-Rochereau station =

Denfert-Rochereau station could refer to:

- Denfert-Rochereau station (Paris RER), a station on the Paris RER network
- Denfert-Rochereau station (Paris Metro), the adjoining Paris Metro station
