= Hôtel de Ville, Montrouge =

Town hall in Montrouge, France

Hôtel de Ville
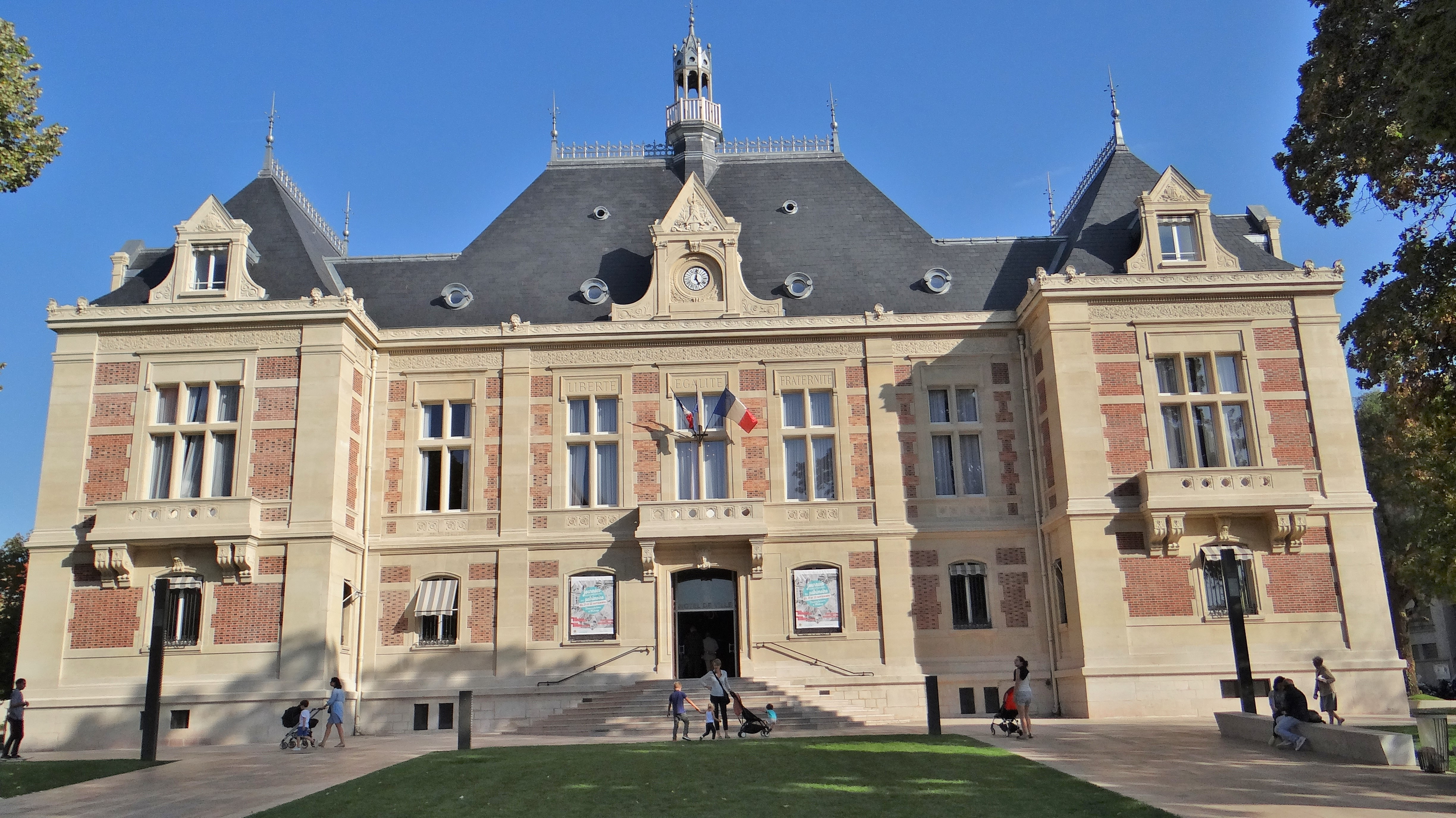
- The main frontage of the Hôtel de Ville in September 2019

General information
- Type: City hall
- Architectural style: Neoclassical style
- Location: Montrouge, France
- Coordinates: 48.8188°N 2.3205°E
- Completed: 1883

Design and construction
- Architect: Jacques Paul Lequeux

The Hôtel de Ville (French pronunciation: [otɛl də vil], City Hall) is a municipal building in Montrouge, Hauts-de-Seine, in the southern suburbs of Paris, standing on Avenue de la République. It has been included on the Inventaire général des monuments by the French Ministry of Culture since 1991.

== History ==
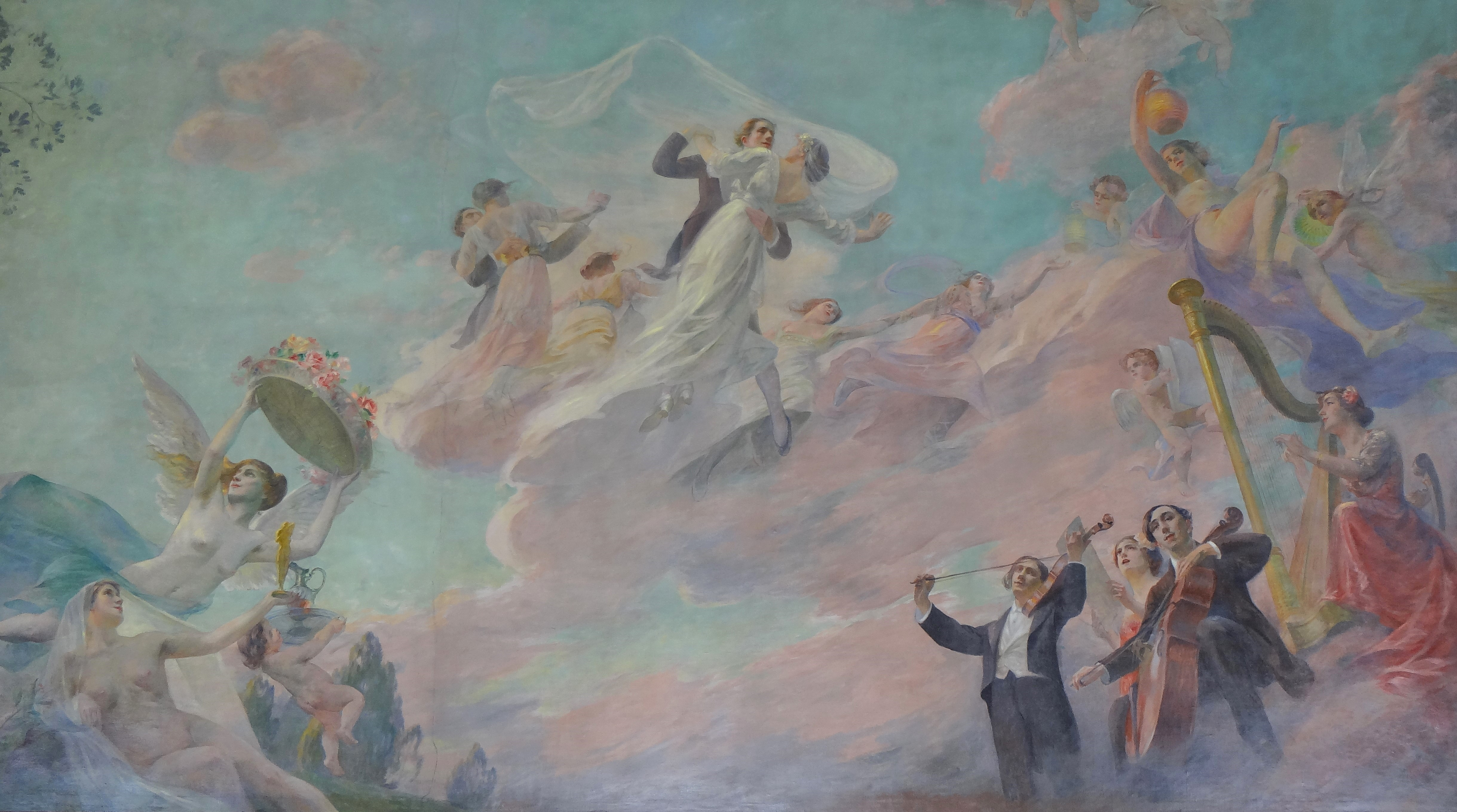
Mural in the wedding room by Henri Jamet

After the French Revolution, the newly elected town council initially held their meetings in the home of the mayor at the time. At that time Montrouge was divided into two distinct areas, Petit-Montrouge and Grand-Montrouge. In the mid-19th century, the council led by the mayor, Alexandre Dareau, decided to commission a dedicated town hall. The site they selected for the first town hall was in what is now Place Ferdinand Brunot in Petit-Montrouge. Construction of the new building started in 1851. It was designed by Claude Naissant in the neoclassical style, built in ashlar stone and was officially opened by the Prefect of the Department of the Seine, Jean-Jacques Berger, in 1855.

However, just five years later, in 1860, by order of Napoleon III, the district of Petit-Montrouge was annexed by the City of Paris to form part of the 14th arrondissement. As the first town hall was within Petit-Montrouge, it was taken by the City of Paris to serve as the town hall of the 14th arrondissement, leaving Grand-Montrouge, which corresponds to the current commune of Montrouge, without municipal offices. It also deprived Montrouge of most of its territory and its population. The council led by the mayor, Jean-François Raveret, therefore decided to commission a new building to replace the building which had been taken. The site they selected this time was occupied by the château of the Duke of La Vallière.

After the château had been demolished, construction of the new building started in 1880. It was designed by Jacques Paul Lequeux in the neoclassical style, built in red brick with stone finishings and was completed in 1883. The original design involved a symmetrical main frontage of just five bays facing onto Avenue de la République. The central bay featured a short flight of steps leaded up to a square headed doorway with a moulded surround and a keystone. The doorway was flanked by brackets supporting a balcony and there was a French door with a cornice on the first floor. Above the central bay, there was a clock flanked by pilasters supporting a pediment and, behind the clock, there was a steep roof and an octagonal lantern. The other bays were fenestrated by segmental headed windows on the ground floor and by cross windows with cornices on the first floor. The central three bays were flanked by Doric order pilasters supporting an entablature and a frieze. The building was extended, with an extra bay at each end, to a design by Jules Baboin in 1903. Internally, the principal rooms were the Salle du Conseil (council chamber), which was decorated with fine ceiling by Théobald Chartran, and the Salle des Mariages (wedding room), which was decorated with a large mural by Henri Jamet.

During the Second World War, the town hall was used by German troops as the local Kommandantur (command post). During the Paris insurrection, the French Resistance seized the town hall on 20 August 1944. However, while this was underway, two members of the French Resistance, Jean Monneron and Eugène Vaudois, were caught by Germans troops and shot. This was five days in advance of the official liberation of the town by the French 2nd Armoured Division, commanded by General Philippe Leclerc, on 25 August 1944.

A new administrative centre, designed by A5A Architectes in the modern style, was erected behind the town hall in 2005.
