= Porte d'Orléans station =

Metro station in Paris, France

Porte d'Orléans
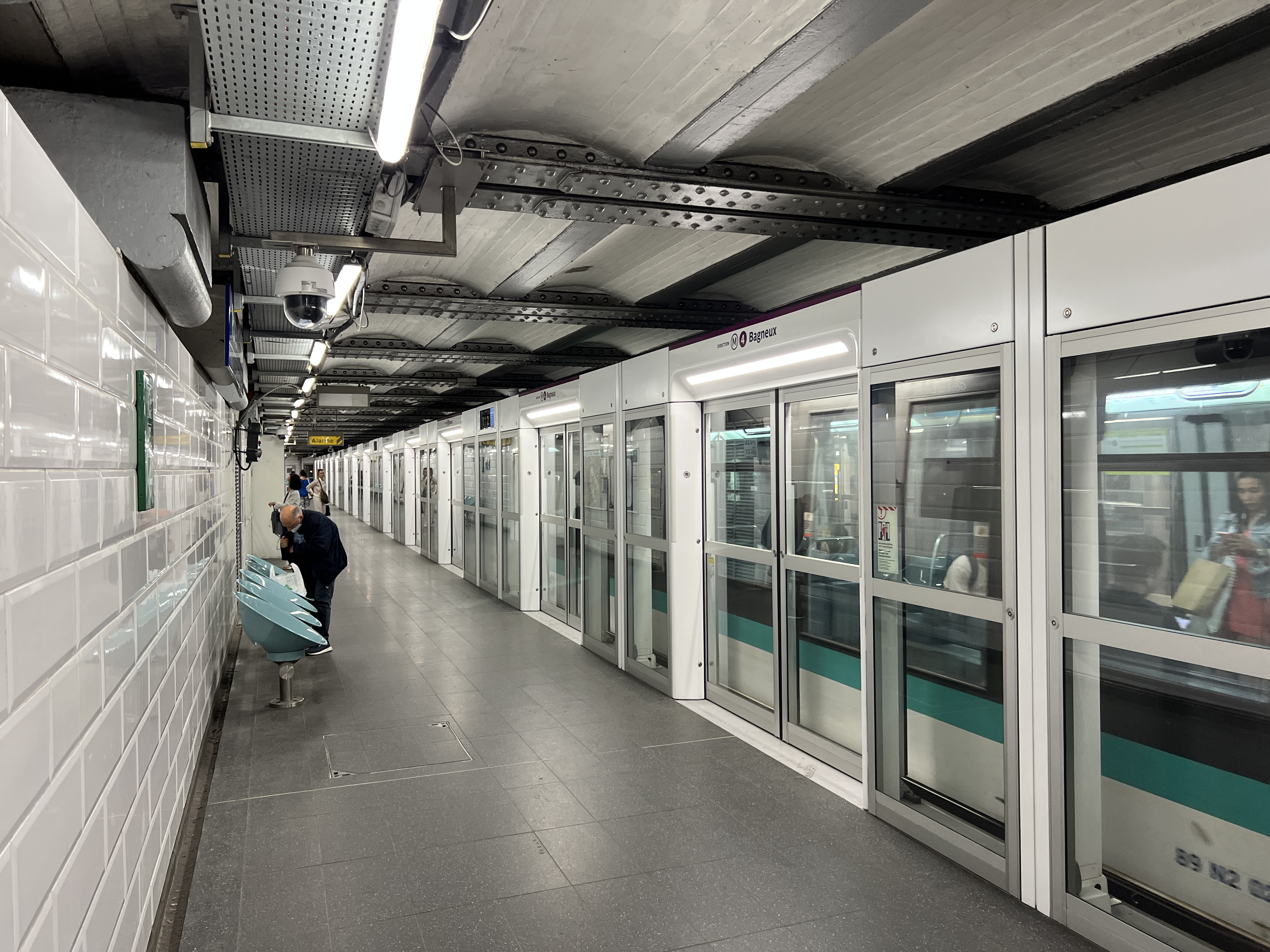
- Line 4 platforms

General information
- Location: Av. Ernest Reyer × av. du Général Leclerc (three); 140, av. du Général Leclerc; 134, boul. Brune; 108, boul. Jourdan; 117, boul. Jourdan; Rue de la Légion Étrangère × av. Ernest Reyer; 14th arrondissement of Paris; Île-de-France; France
- Coordinates: 48°49′23.48″N 2°19′31.31″E
- Owner: RATP
- Operator: RATP

Construction
- Accessible: Yes

Other information
- Fare zone: 1

History
- Opened: 30 October 1909

Services
Preceding station	Paris Metro	Following station
Mairie de Montrouge towards Bagneux–Lucie Aubrac	Line 4	Alésia towards Porte de Clignancourt
Location
- Location within Paris

Porte d'Orléans (Général Leclerc) (French pronunciation: [pɔʁt dɔʁleɑ̃ ʒeneʁal ləklɛʁ]) is a station of line 4 of the Paris Métro and a stop on tramway line 3a. It is situated in the 14th Arrondissement, in the quartier of Petit-Montrouge. The station is the former southern terminus of line 4. A terminal loop was provided at the station for trains to turn around to return north towards Porte de Clignancourt. Passengers used to disembark at the arrival platform and then the train proceeded empty via the loop to the departure platform. The extension to Mairie de Montrouge modified the layout of the station, the northbound platform was extended toward the track coming from the former terminal loop to add a new entrance.

== History ==
The station was opened on 30 October 1909 as part of the second section of line 4 opened between Porte d'Orléans and Raspail before it was connected under the Seine on 9 January 1910. In 2006, Paris Tramway Line 3 (now 3a) opened, with a stop at Porte d'Orléans.

The station lies just on the Parisian side of the border with Montrouge, the neighbouring commune. In 2013, line 4 was extended south into Montrouge, with a future extension toward Bagneux planned. This should reduce bus traffic around the Porte d'Orléans.

== Name ==
The station is named after the Porte d'Orléans, a gate in the nineteenth century Thiers wall of Paris, which led to the town of Orléans via the road now known as route nationale 20, or N20. Its subtitle is for the World War II general Philippe Leclerc de Hauteclocque, known by his nom de guerre of Général Leclerc. On 25 August 1944, Leclerc entered Paris via the Porte d'Orléans with tanks of the 2nd Armored division, on his way to liberate Paris from the German occupation.

A memorial to Leclerc is near the station, between Rue de la Légion Étrangère and Avenue de la Porte-d'Orléans. On the west side of Rue de la Légion Étrangère is Square du Serment-de-Koufra, a park commemorating a pledge made by Leclerc on 2 March 1941, the day after taking the Italian fort at Kufra, Libya: he swore that his weapons would not be laid down until the French flag flew over the cathedrals of Metz and of Strasbourg.

== Connections ==
- Tramway Line 3a
- RATP buses 28, 38, 62, 68, 125, 126, 128, 187, 188, 194, 197, 295, 297, 299
- CEAT buses 10.07, 10.20, 10.21
- Daniel Meyer buses DM151, DM152
- Sqybus 475
- Night buses N14, N21, N66

== Station layout ==
Street Level

B1	Mezzanine for platform connection

Northbound	← toward Porte de Clignancourt (Alésia)
Side platform, with PSDs, doors will open on the right
Southbound	toward Bagneux–Lucie Aubrac (Mairie de Montrouge) →
Side platform, with PSDs, doors will open on the right

== Gallery ==
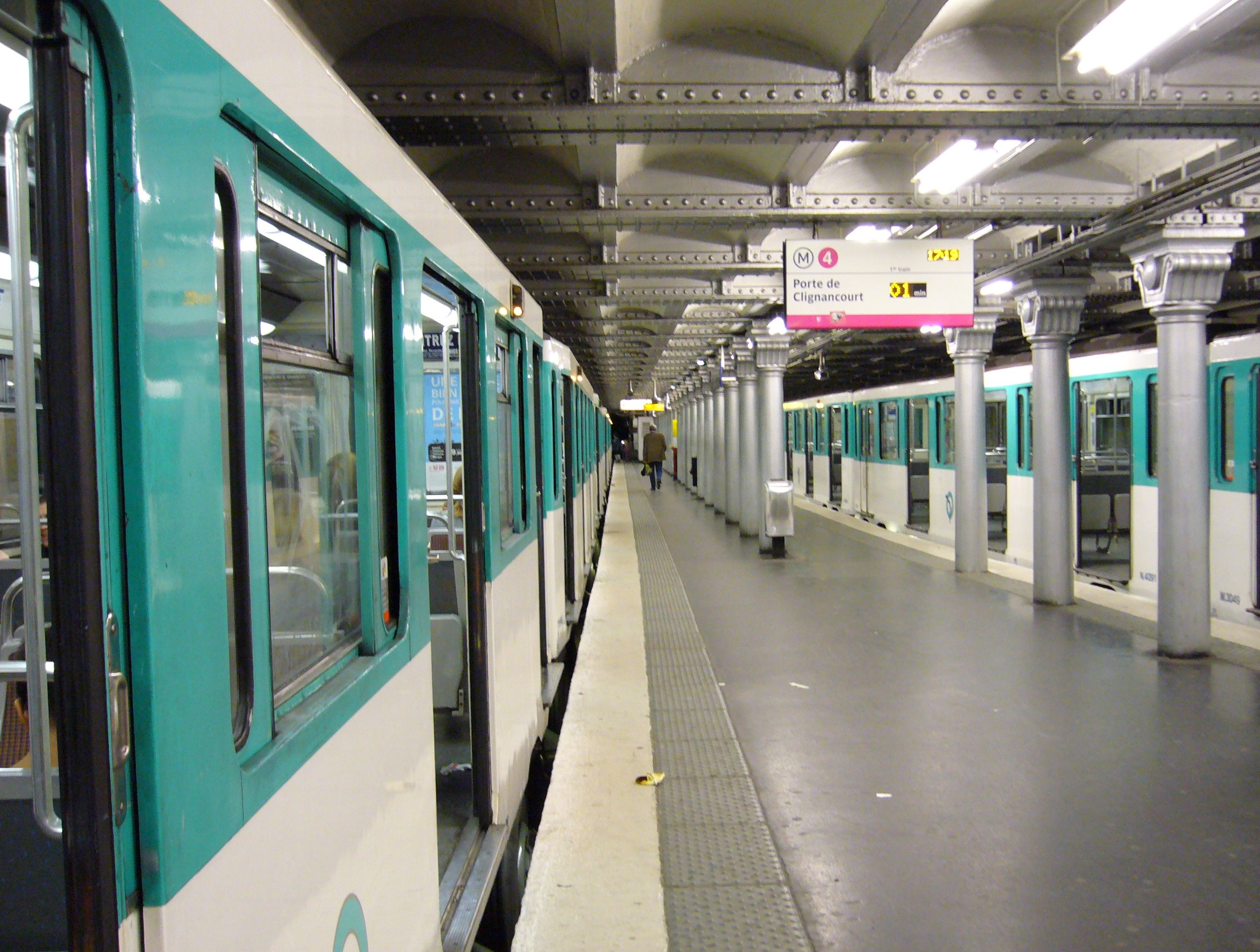
Line 4 platforms at Porte d'Orléans

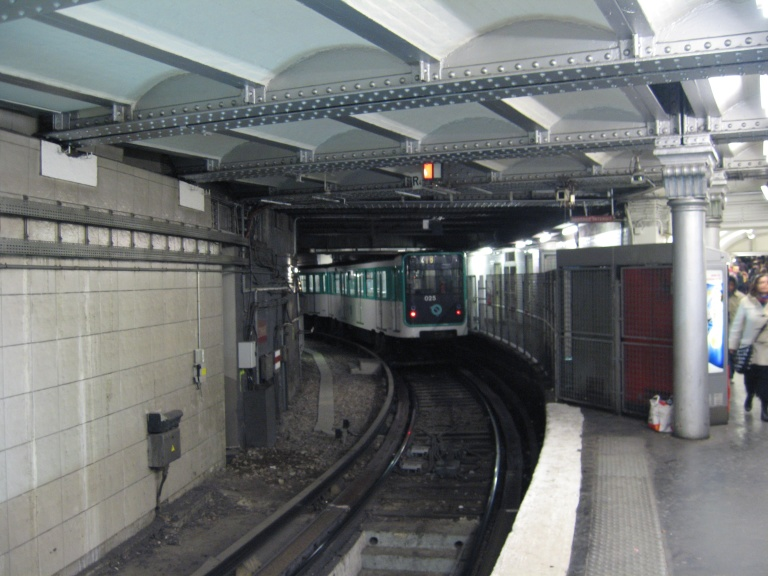
MP 59 rolling stock on Line 4 at Porte d'Orléans
