= Nicolas Michelin =

French architect and urban planner (born 1955)

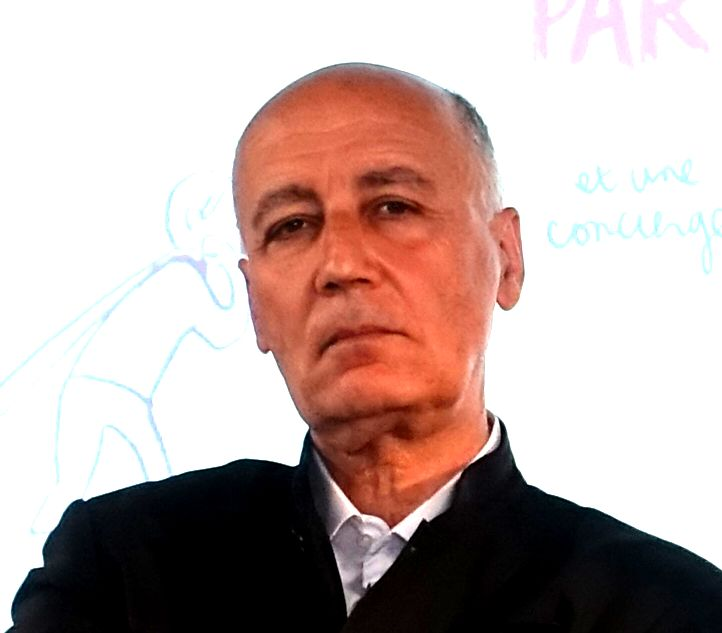
- Nicolas Michelin in 2019
- Born: 25 January 1955 (age 71); Neuilly-sur-Seine, France
- Education: École d’Architecture de Paris-Conflans
- Occupations: Architect, urban planner
- Years active: 1985-present
- Awards: Chevalier of the Legion of Honour
- Practice: LABFAC (1985-2000); Agence Nicolas Michelin & Associés (2000-present); Studio Maé (2020-present)

Nicolas Michelin (born 25 January 1955) is a French architect and urban planner. After joining forces with Finn Geipel to form LABFAC in 1988, he founded Agence Nicolas Michelin & Associés (ANMA) in 2000, which he currently runs in collaboration with his partners Michel Delplace and Cyril Trétout. He also has a firm dedicated to experimental projects called Studio Maé.

== Early life and education ==
Michelin was born in 1955 in Neuilly-sur-Seine, Paris, the sixth of nine children. His father was an architect from Paris and the grandson of André Michelin, co-founder of Michelin. His mother was a nurse from Marseille and the granddaughter of Pierre Puiseux. Michel received his DUES in physics and mathematics at Paris VI University before beginning his studies in architecture at the École d’Architecture de Paris-Conflans in 1974.

== Career ==
Michelin worked with architects Xavier Henry and Christoph Lyon in Paris between 1981 and 1987. In 1988, he and German architect Finn Geipel founded the architecture firm Laboratory for Architecture (LABFAC), working between Paris and Berlin. Some of the notable projects from this collaboration included the École des Beaux Arts in Limoges and the Théâtre de Cornouaille in Quimper. Between 1985 and 2000, he directed the École and Centre d’Art Contemporain in Rueil-Malmaison.

In 2000, along with Michel Delplace and Cyril Trétout, he founded Agence Nicolas Michelin & Associés (ANMA), a firm involved in architecture, urban design and landscaping. He also founded the La Maréchalerie, an arts centre (ENSAV) dedicated to research on the role of art in the urban environment, within the École nationale supérieure d'architecture de Versailles, and was the head director between the years of 2000 and 2009. In 2008, he was the general curator for AGORA, a biennial architecture, urban planning and design exhibition, in Bordeaux. In 2010, for ANMA's 10-year anniversary, he organised a 4-day event to showcase some of the projects designed by ANMA in the past decade; this was published in Michelin's 2010 book Attitudes. The event also featured an exhibition with debates on ecology, the city and contemporary art. Similarly, the 2017 book ANMA - Arquitectura 2001-2017 showcased some of the firm's competition-winning designs since its inception.

Michelin has written for and overseen more than seven publications. In 2005, he wrote Nouveau Paris, la ville et ses possibles, the catalogue accompanying the eponymous exhibition at the Pavillon de l'Arsenal (17 March to 28 August 2005). Created with Toyo Ito, the exhibition explored possible future developments in Paris, bearing in mind the requirements of sustainable development and new urban lifestyles. His 2008 book Cinq sur cinq – Dix projets sur mesure analysed five architectural and urban projects completed by ANMA. In 2008, following AGORA, he wrote Alerte! Et si on pensait un peu plus à elle?, a manifesto in favour of sustainable architecture and urban design. In 2010, he released a film, Bordeaux 2046, for the Venice Biennial that looked at a number of projects underway and offered fictional representations of possible future projects for the city. Michelin has also been a guest speaker at universities and conferences around the world. In 2011, he chaired a forum on "heritage and architecture of sustainable cities" at Cité Internationale Universitaire de Paris.

In 2005, he was awarded the Legion of Honour with the distinction of Chevalier. The following year, Gilles Coudert of a.p.r.e.s production directed a short film, Vers une hybridation des usages - Portrait de Nicolas Michelin, about Michelin and his work. This came after he won a 2005 design competition for the ARTEM campus in Nancy.

== Selected projects ==
- École des Beaux Arts, Limoges, 1994
- Théâtre de Cornouaille, Quimper, 1998
- La Halle aux Farines, Paris, 2006
- Bureaux de l’Agence de l’eau, Rouen, 2006
- Habiter les Quais housing project, Nantes, 2007
- Théâtre Piscine, Châtenay-Malabry, 2008
- Social housing, Nancy, 2010
- ZAC des Deux Lions housing project, Tours, 2010
- ZAC Grand Large housing project, Dunkirk, 2010
- ARTEM campus in Nancy, 2011
- Réidence de la Marne social housing, Alfortville, 2012
- L’étang des cygnes residential project, Meaux, 2012
- La Petite Folly housing project, Meaux, 2012
- Housing, Îlot Armagnac, media library and gymnasium, Bordeaux, 2012

== Bibliography ==
- LABFAC / Laboratory for Architecture; edited by Jac Fol. - Editions du Centre Pompidou, Paris, 1998. With Finn Geipel. ISBN 9782858509485.
- Nouveaux paris : la ville et ses possibles/sous la direction de Nicolas Michelin, Editions du Pavillon de l'Arsenal, Paris, 2005. ISBN 9782708407367.
- Avis - Propos sur l’architecture, la ville, l’environnement, Editions Archibooks, Paris, 2006. ISBN 9782915639223.
- L’aventure de la transformation d’une halle – Des farines à l’université, Editions Ante Prima, Paris, 2007. ISBN 9782871431749.
- Cinq sur cinq – Dix projets sur mesure, Editions Archibooks, Paris, 2008. ISBN 9782357330009.
- Alerte! – Et si on pensait un peu plus à elle? Et si on profitait un peu plus de lui ?, Editions Archibooks, Paris, 2008. ISBN 9782357330016.
- Attitudes: Propos sur l'architecture, la ville, l'environnement, Editions Archibooks, Paris, 2010. ISBN 9782357331259.
