= Régis Barthélemy Mouton-Duvernet =

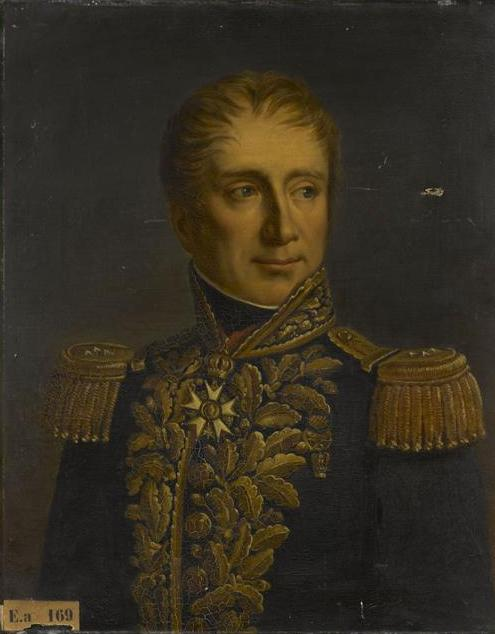
Le comte Régis-Barthélémy Mouton-Duvernet, a posthumous 1845 portrait by Louise Adélaïde Desnos

Régis Barthélemy, Baron Mouton-Duvernet (French pronunciation: [ʁeʒi baʁtelemi mutɔ̃ dyvɛʁnɛ]; 3 May 1771 - 27 July 1816) was a French general who after the Hundred Days was executed by the Bourbon restoration.

Born in Puy-en-Velay in 1771 Mouton-Duvernet entered the French army in 1785. Having served in the colonies, mainly in Guadeloupe, upon the outbreak of the French revolution he served in the Siege of Toulon. Mouton-Duvernet later served in the Italian campaign and distinguished himself at Arcole. Having been promoted to colonel and given command of the 63rd Infantry Regiment, Mouton-Duvernet served in Spain. Having been ennobled a baron in 1808, he was promoted to general de brigade in July 1811 and general de division in August 1813. After the siege of Dresden he became prisoner of war. Serving as governor of Valence, upon Napoleon's return in 1815 Mouton-Duvernet rallied to the emperor, serving in the Chamber of Deputies as a representative for the Haut-Loire. Opposing the return of the Bourbons, he was made governor of Lyon on 2 July 1815.

Upon the return of the Bourbons, he was declared a traitor by the Royal Ordinance of 24 July 1815, and he tried to hide but was arrested and tried by court-martial, which sentenced him to death on 25 July 1816. Mouton-Duvernet was executed by firing squad on 27 July 1816 in Lyon.

A street and a metro station in Paris are named in remembrance of the general.

His name is inscribed on the western pillar of the Arc de Triomphe.
