= Mairie de Montrouge station =

Metro station in Montrouge, France

Mairie de Montrouge
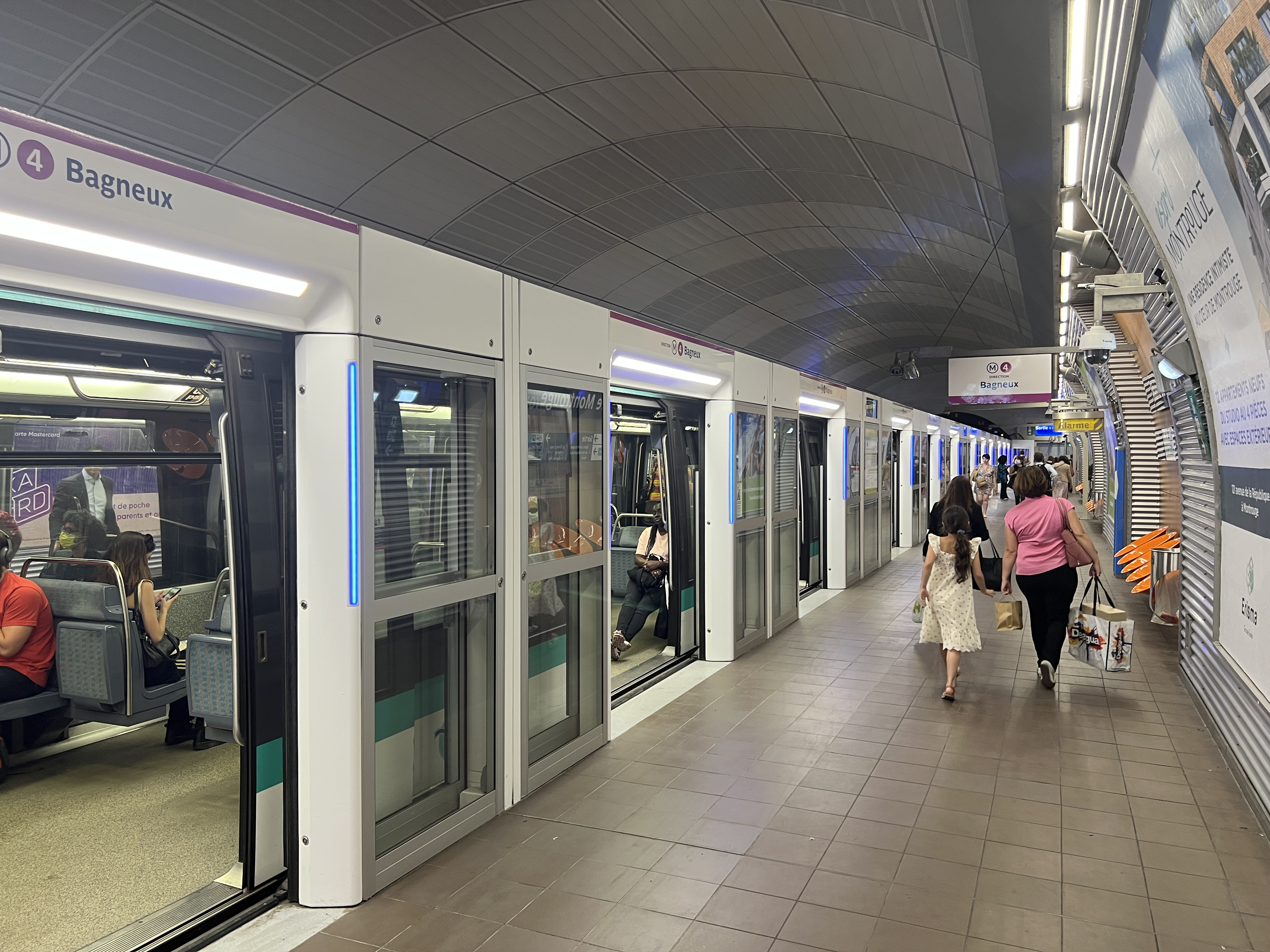
- Mairie de Montrouge platforms with PSDs after the line extension to Bagneux

General information
- Location: Église Saint-Jacques; Avenue de la République; Rue Louis Rolland; Place du Général-Leclerc; Montrouge; Île-de-France; France
- Coordinates: 48°49′06″N 2°19′10″E
- Owner: RATP
- Operator: RATP
- Line: Paris Metro Paris Metro Line 4
- Platforms: 2 (side platforms)
- Tracks: 2

Construction
- Accessible: yes

Other information
- Fare zone: 1

History
- Opened: 23 March 2013

Services
Preceding station	Paris Metro	Following station
Barbara towards Bagneux–Lucie Aubrac	Line 4	Porte d'Orléans towards Porte de Clignancourt
Location
- Location within Paris

Mairie de Montrouge (French pronunciation: [mɛʁi d(ə) mɔ̃ʁuʒ]) is a station on Line 4 of the Paris Métro in the southern inner suburb of Montrouge. Opened in 2013, it was the first new station of Line 4 in almost one hundred years. The station served as the southern terminus of Line 4 until January 2022, when the southward extension towards Bagneux opened as part of phase two.

== Location ==
The station is located in Montrouge under the Avenue de la Republique, between Rue Gabriel-Péri and the Place du Marechal-Leclerc.

== History ==
Line 4 was one of a few Métro lines that was never extended beyond Paris city limits, though an initial extension towards La Vache-Noire was originally planned (but never carried out). Nearly a century after the line's opening, construction of the Montrouge extension commenced, with the new Mairie de Montrouge station opening to passengers on 23 March 2013.

It was part of the first stage of an extension of Line 4 to Bagneux (which opened on 13 January 2022). Such an extension had been planned since 1929, originally via a different route. In 2004, the cost of the first section was estimated at €152 million for a length of 780 meters. As part of the second stage of the extension, the line reaches Barbara metro station between the Cimetière parisien de Bagneux and the Montrouge fort, and then terminates at Bagneux-Lucie Aubrac station located to the north of the commune.

In 2018, 7,081,319 passengers passed through the metro station placing it in 45th position for usage of all 302 stations.

=== Inauguration ===
The station was inaugurated on 23 March 23, 2013 by Frédéric Cuvillier, Minister Delegate for Transport and Maritime Economy, Jean-Paul Huchon, President of the Regional Council of Île-de-France and President of the Union Transportation Union -de-France (STIF), Patrick Devedjian, Chairman of the General Council of Hauts-de-Seine, Jean-Loup Metton, Mayor of Montrouge, and Pierre Mongin, President and CEO of RATP. The station, the 302nd in the Paris metro, was put into service the same day.

== Passenger services ==
=== Access ===
The station has three entrances:

- a main lift access located on the forecourt of the Saint-Jacques church, on the corner of Rue Gabriel-Péri and Avenue de la République, facing the town hall;
- a northern entrance located on the forecourt of the cultural centre, Place Émile-Cresp, on the corner of Rue Gabriel-Péri and Avenue de la Republique, facing the town hall; this entrance opened in 2014;
- a south entrance on the Place du Général-Leclerc.

=== Station layout ===
Street Level

B1	Mezzanine for platform connection

P Platforms	Side platform with PSDs, doors will open on the right
P Platforms	Platform 2	← toward Porte de Clignancourt (Porte d'Orléans)
P Platforms	Platform 1	toward Bagneux-Lucie Aubrac (Barbara) →
P Platforms	Side platform with PSDs doors will open on the right

=== Platforms ===
Mairie de Montrouge is a standard configuration station. It has two platforms separated by metro tracks. The roof is elliptical (which is rare for stations built in recent decades). The décor is contemporary and materials vary, with sides covered with an alternation of wooden panels and silver metal camber in which are incorporated the advertising frames, and a grey coating on the roof and tunnel exits are painted white. The lighting is semi-direct and the name of the station is written in Parisine font on enamelled plates. The platforms, tiled in anthracite grey, are equipped with orange Akiko seats.

The station hosts a work by Hugues Reip, both in the corridors and on the platforms.

=== Bus connections ===
The station is served by Lines 68, 126 and 128 of the RATP Bus Network and Line 475 of the Sqybus bus network.

== Nearby ==
The Montrouge town hall, the belfry of Montrouge, which is a cultural and congress center, as well as the church of Saint-Jacques-le-Majeur are in the immediate vicinity of the station.

== Bibliography ==
- Roland, Gérard (2003). Stations de métro. D’Abbesses à Wagram. Éditions Bonneton.
