= Finn Geipel =

Finn Geipel (born 23 November 1958 in Stuttgart) is a German Architect and Urbanist. He is co-founder of the architecture and urban planning office LIN.

== Life ==
Geipel studied architecture from 1981 to 1987 at the University of Stuttgart. In 1983, together with Bernd Hoge and Jochen Hunger, he founded Labfac, Laboratory for Architecture, a network of architects and artists. In 1987, collaboration with Nicolas Michelin began a new chapter of Labfac in Paris.

In 2001, Finn Geipel and Giulia Andi founded the architecture and urban planning office LIN. Based in Berlin and Paris, the office works on a wide range of projects and research assignments throughout Europe. Recent projects include the renovation of Saint-Nazaire submarine bunker, the Cité du Design in St. Etienne and Grand Paris Métropole Douce.

Finn Geipel is a full-time professor of architecture and building science in the architecture department at Technische Universität Berlin, since 2000. He is the advisor of the Laboratory for Integrative Architecture (LIA), a research branch of LIN at Technische Universität Berlin. He has been a visiting professor at École Spéciale d'Architecture (ESA) Paris, Escola Tècnica Superior d'Arquitectura (ESARQ) Barcelona, Columbia University New York and Massachusetts Institute of Technology (MIT) Boston-Cambridge.

Since 2012, Finn Geipel has been a member of the Cluster of Excellence at Humboldt University of Berlin.

Finn Geipel is a member of the AIGP-Atelier International du Grand Paris, the scientific advisory board of the Grand Paris Métropole Douce.

== Work ==
- Flexible Roof of Arena, Nîmes, France (1989)
- École Nationale d’Arts Décoratifs, Limoges, France (1990–1994)
- Théâtre de Cornouaille, Quimper, France (1991–1998)
- Exhibitionspace Pavillon de l’Arsenal, Paris, France (2003)
- Alvéole 14, Transformation Submarine Bunker, St. Nazaire, France (2003–2007)
- Syn chron, Installation Carsten Nicolai, Neue Nationalgalerie, Berlin, Germany (2005)
- Cité du Design, St. Etienne, France (2004–2009)
- Grand Paris Métropole Douce, Paris, France (2008–2009)
- Atelier Building Pajol, Paris, France (2008–2012)
- Bagneux–Lucie Aubrac Paris Métro station, Paris, France, 2022

== Awards ==
- 2010: Chevalier de la Légion d‘Honneur
- 2006: Chevalier des Arts et des Lettres

== Publications ==
- Jac Fol: Labfac: Finn Geipel, Nicolas Michelin Laboratory for Architecture Centre Georges Pompidou, 1998 Paris, ISBN 2-85850-948-4
- Wilhelm Klauser, Catherine Métais-Bürend, Isabelle Taudière: LABFAC In: L’Architecture d’Aujourd’hui n°327 April 2000, Paris
- Finn Geipel, Giulia Andi: Cité du Design – Saint-Étienne Editions Jean-Michel Place, 2006 Paris, ISBN 2-85893-880-6
- Finn Geipel, Giulia Andi, équipe LIN: Grand Paris métropole douce : Hypothèses sur le paysage post-Kyoto Ed. Nouvelles éditions Jean-Michel Place, 2009 Paris, ISBN 2-7010-1548-0

== Links ==
- Official Website of LIN
