= Rue d'Alésia =

Street in Paris, France

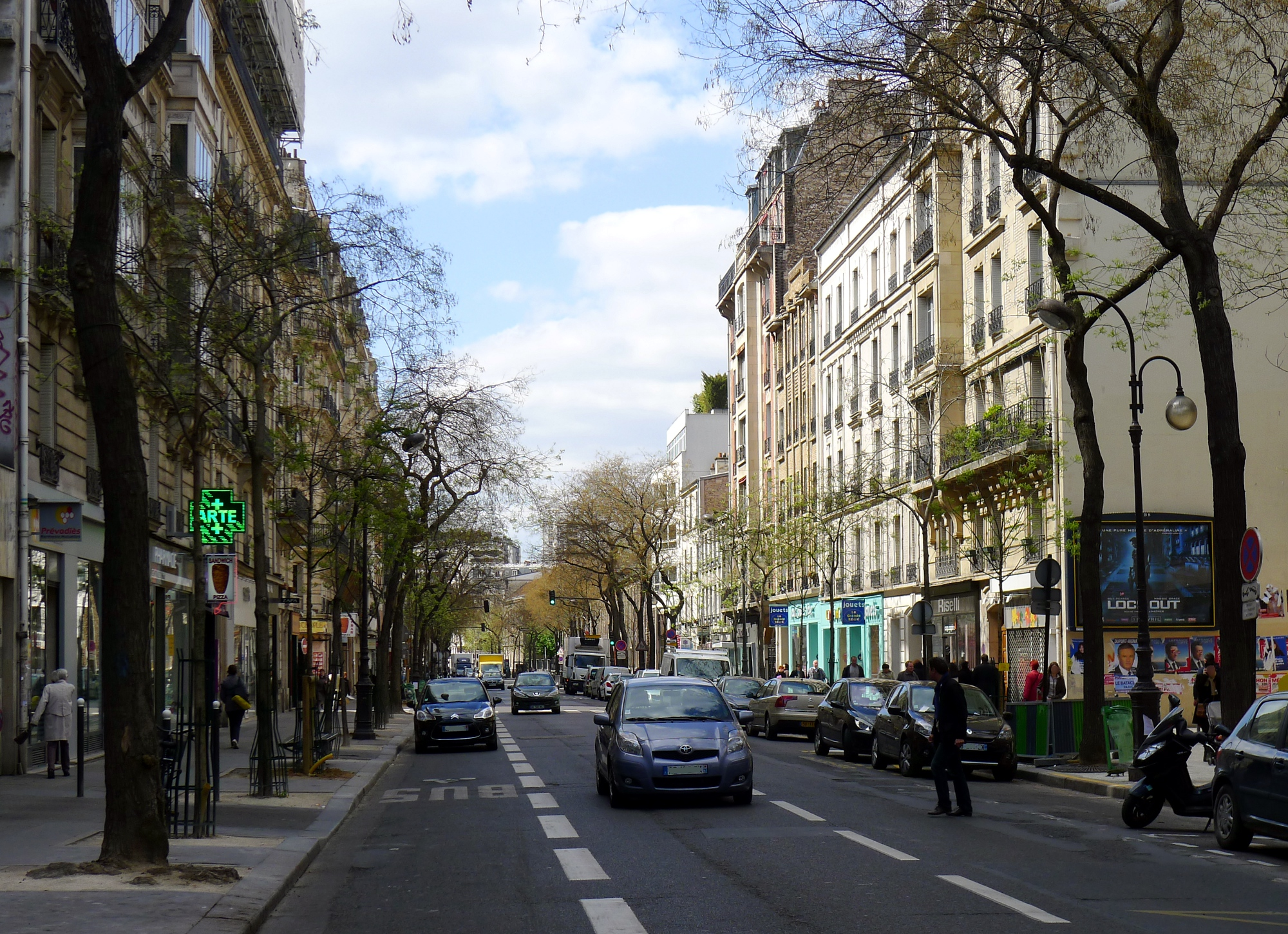

- Location within Paris
- Arrondissement: 14th
- Coordinates: 48°49′39″N 2°20′4″E
- From: Rue de Tolbiac
- To: Rue de Vouillé

The Rue d'Alésia is a major street in the south of Paris, which runs along the entire east–west length of the 14th arrondissement. It is one of the few streets in Paris named after a French defeat, or more precisely, a Gallic defeat: the Battle of Alesia. Lined with acacia trees, the street extends to the east as the Rue de Tolbiac into the 13th arrondissement, and to the west as the Rue de Vouillé into the 15th arrondissement. It intersects the Avenue du Général Leclerc at the Place Victor et Hélène Basch (or simply Alésia), the location of the Église Saint Pierre de Montrouge and the Alésia Métro station.

Mahmoud Hamshari, the representative of the Palestine Liberation Organization to France, was assassinated by Mossad agents at his home in the Rue d'Alésia on 8 December 1972.
