= Bagneux–Lucie Aubrac station =

Metro station in Bagneux, France

Bagneux–Lucie Aubrac
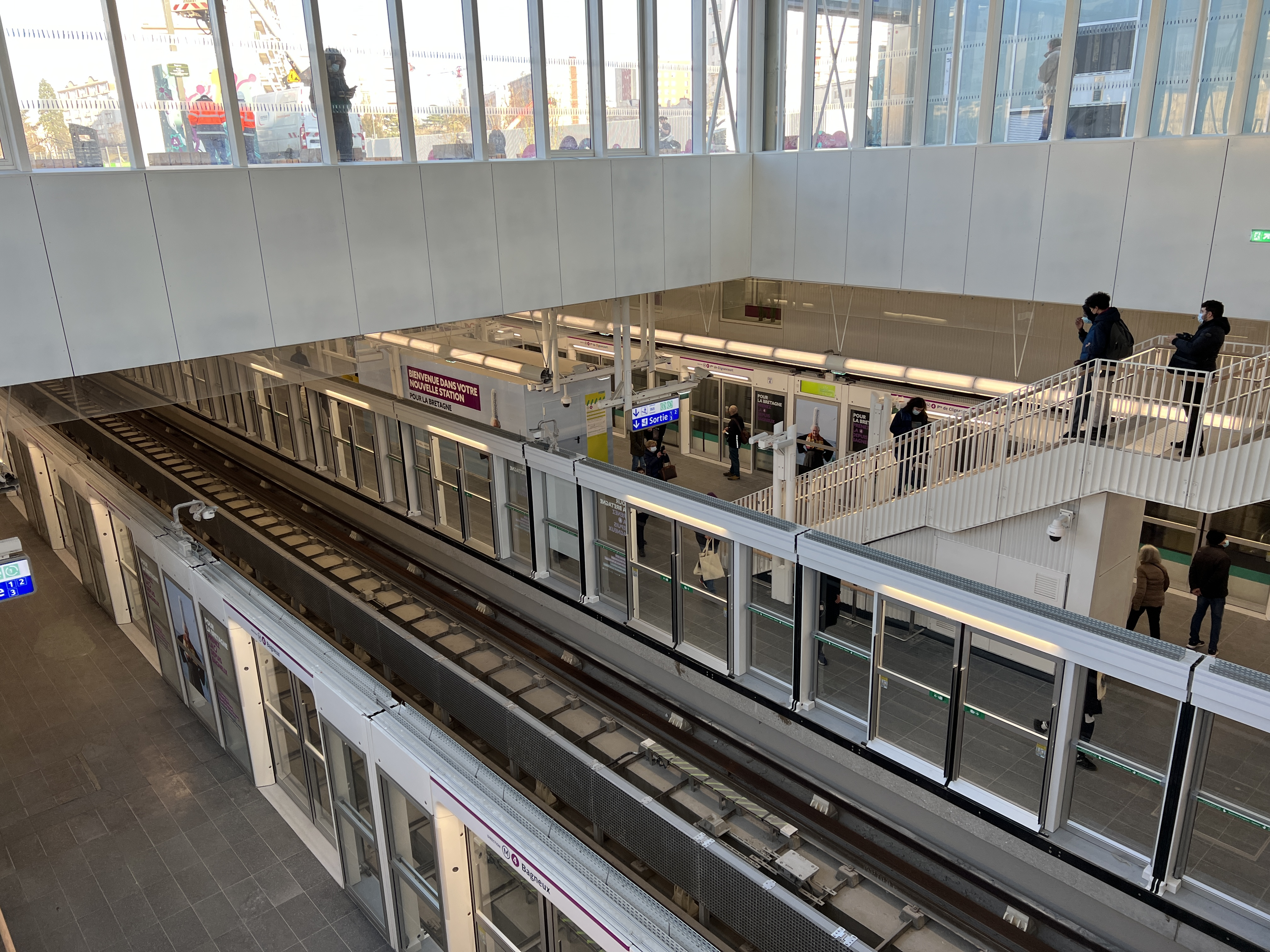
- Station platforms in January 2022

General information
- Location: Bagneux; Île-de-France; France
- Coordinates: 48.8027°N 2.3173°E
- System: Paris Metro station
- Owner: RATP
- Operator: RATP
- Line: Paris Metro Paris Metro Line 4
- Platforms: 2 (side platforms)
- Tracks: 2

Construction
- Accessible: yes
- Architect: LIN (Finn Geipel and Giulia Andi)

Other information
- Fare zone: 1

History
- Opened: 13 January 2022; 4 years ago

Services
Preceding station	Paris Metro	Following station
Terminus	Line 4	Barbara towards Porte de Clignancourt

Future services
Preceding station	Paris Metro	Following station
Châtillon–Montrouge towards Pont de Sèvres	Line 15 (autumn 2027)	Arcueil–Cachan towards Noisy–Champs
Location
- Location within Paris

Bagneux–Lucie Aubrac (French pronunciation: [baɲø lysi obʁak]) is a Paris Metro station in Bagneux, Hauts-de-Seine. It is the southern terminus of Line 4, and was built as part of a two-station southward extension from Mairie de Montrouge, the previous terminus of the line. The adjacent station is Barbara. The station opened in January 2022. In future, it will be served by Line 15.

== History ==
The extension of Line 4 south from Mairie de Montrouge received a déclaration d'utilité publique in February 2005. Work to build the extension began in 2015, and was planned to open in 2020. During the planning stages of the extension, the station was tentatively called Bagneux. Following a public vote, the station was named after Lucie Aubrac, a member of the French Resistance during World War II.

The station was opened on 13 January 2022 by Prime Minister Jean Castex. The extension is expected to bring 37,000 new passengers per day. The cost of the extension was €406 million, split between the Île-de-France region (60%), the State (25.7%), and the Hauts-de-Seine department (14.3%).

South of the station, the Line 4 tunnels continue along Avenue Henri Barbusse for 800 metres allowing for train storage and maintenance.

=== Grand Paris Express ===
In 2011, it was announced that the station will connect to the new Paris Metro Line 15, part of Grand Paris Express. This is planned to open in autumn 2027. There are also plans to build an eco-quarter around the station with over 2,000 new residents, following the completion of the Line 15 station.

== Passenger services ==
=== Access ===
The station has five entrance/exits:

- Three accesses – Rue de Verdun, Avenue Henri Barbusse and Place Lucie Aubrac – are located in a large station building north of Avenue Henri Barbusse, adjacent to the construction site for the Line 15 station.
- Access 4 "Avenue de Stalingrad" is located to the north of the main entrance building and Place Lucie Aubrac, in a small standalone building.
- Access 5 "Rue Claude Debussy" is an exit from the terminating Line 4 platform, integrated into a residential building.

=== Other services ===
The station connects with lines 162, 188 and 388 of the RATP bus network.

== Architecture and artwork ==
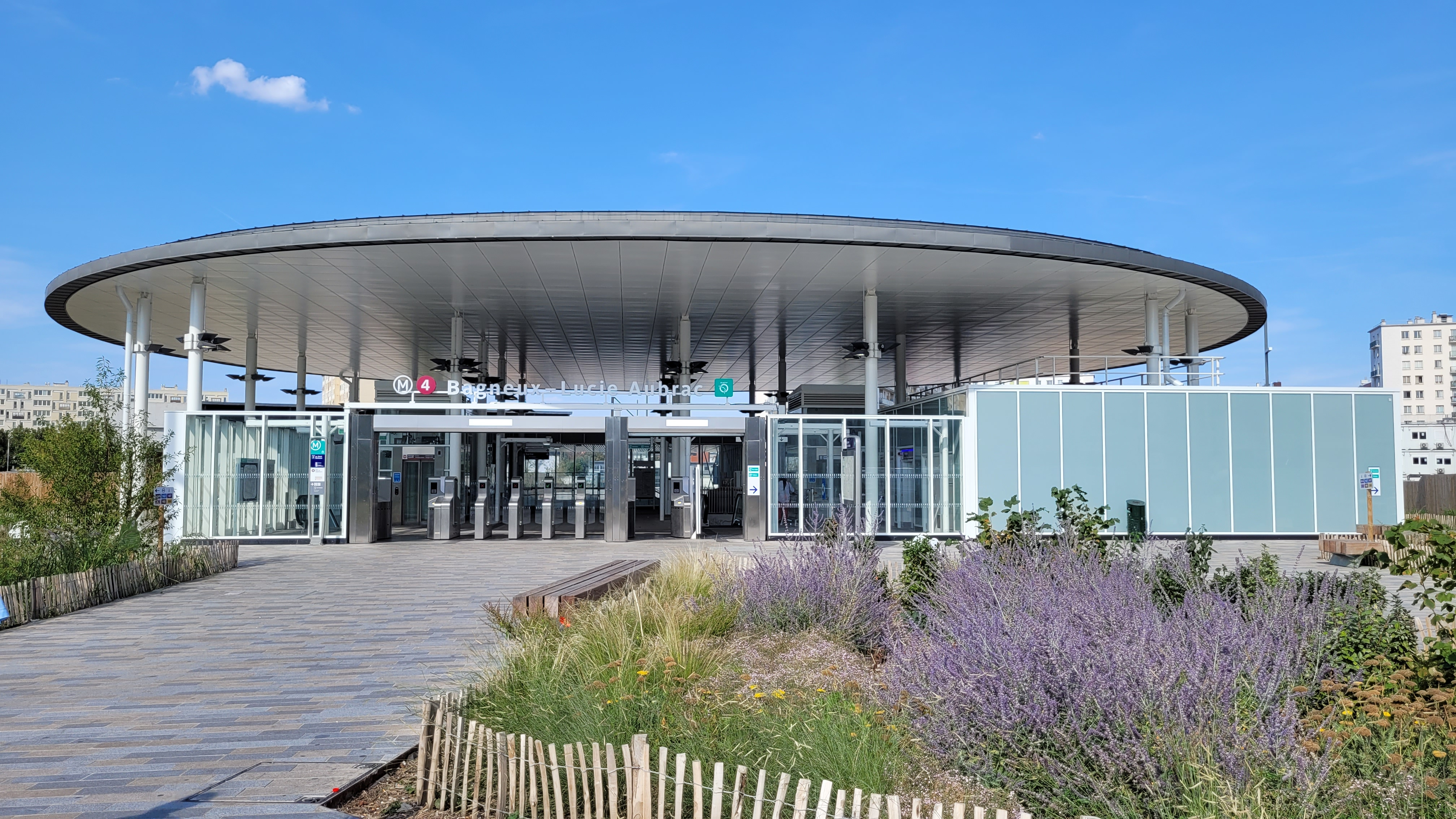
Main station entrance

=== Line 4 ===
The station was designed by LIN (Finn Geipel and Giulia Andi). The design uses white corrugated metal panels on the walls, as well as large circular light fittings – a similar concept was also used at Aimé Césaire and Mairie d'Aubervilliers stations on line 12. The platforms are fitted with platform edge doors, installed as part of the automation of Line 4.

Inside the station, two portraits of Lucie Aubrac were created by the artist C215. On a gable of a building outside the station, artist Andréa Michaelsson (also known as Btoy) has painted a large portrait of Lucie Aubrac. On the nearby maintenance building, a metal bas-relief by Argentinian artist Ricardo Mosner shows the history of underground mines, quarries and the Metro in the local area.

=== Line 15 ===
The station has been designed by French architect Marc Barani. An artwork by Italian artist Tatiana Trouvé will take inspiration from caves, fossils and troglodytes.
