= Porte de Clignancourt station =

Metro station in Paris, France

Porte de Clignancourt
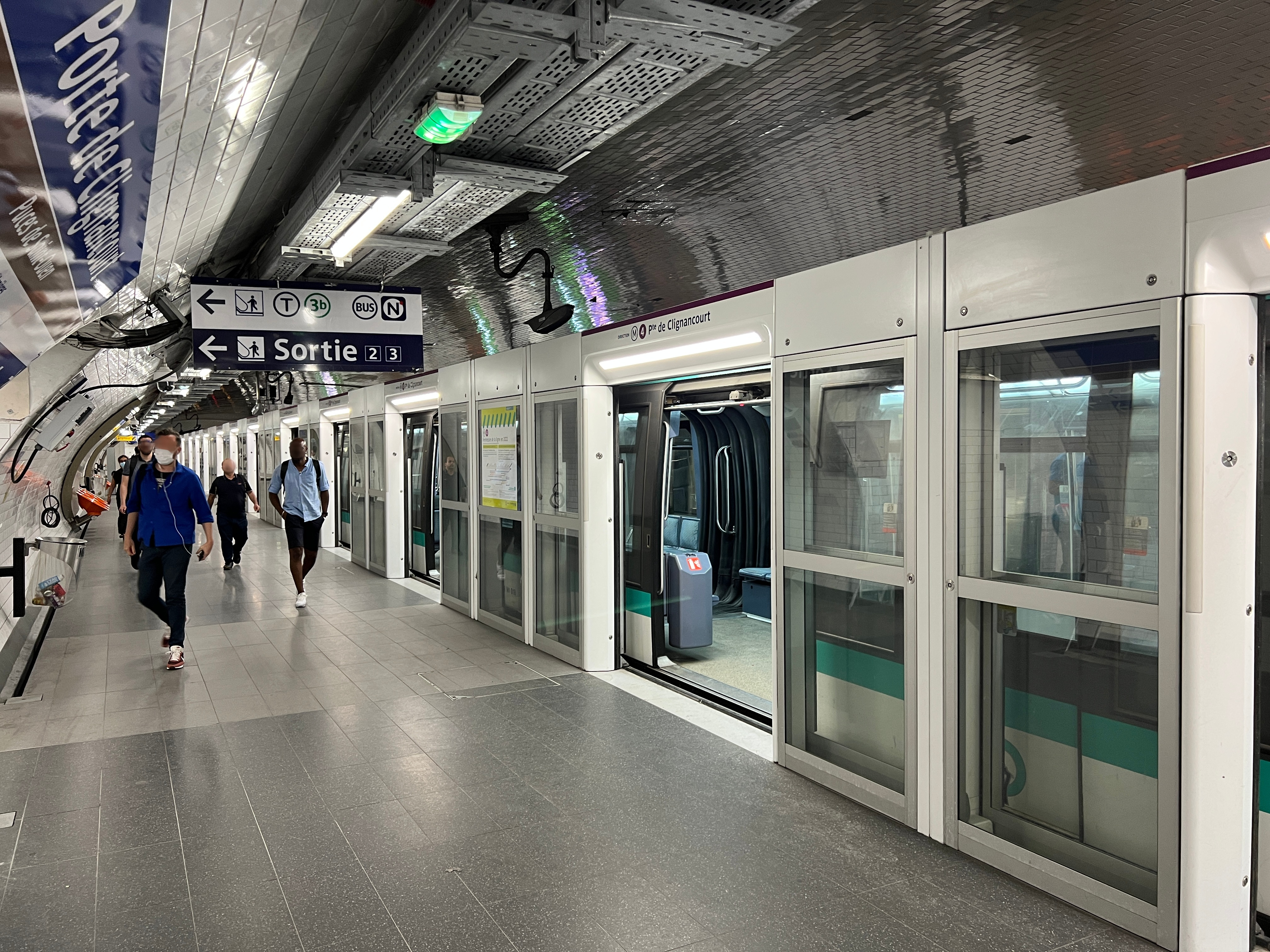
- Platform

General information
- Location: 79, boul. Ornano; 80 bis, boul. Ornano; 82, boul. Ornano; 18th arrondissement of Paris; Île-de-France; France
- Coordinates: 48°53′49″N 2°20′42″E
- Owner: RATP
- Operator: RATP
- Line: Paris Metro Paris Metro Line 4
- Platforms: 2 (side platforms)
- Tracks: 2

Construction
- Accessible: no

Other information
- Fare zone: 1

History
- Opened: 21 April 1908; 118 years ago

Services
| Preceding station | Paris Metro | Following station |
|---|---|---|
| Simplon towards Bagneux–Lucie Aubrac | Line 4 | Terminus |
Location
- Location within Paris

Porte de Clignancourt (French pronunciation: [pɔʁt də kliɲɑ̃kuʁ]; lit. 'Gate of Clignancourt') is the northern terminus of Line 4 of the Paris Métro in the 18th arrondissement.

== Location ==
The station is located under Boulevard Ornano at the Porte de Clignancourt.

== History ==
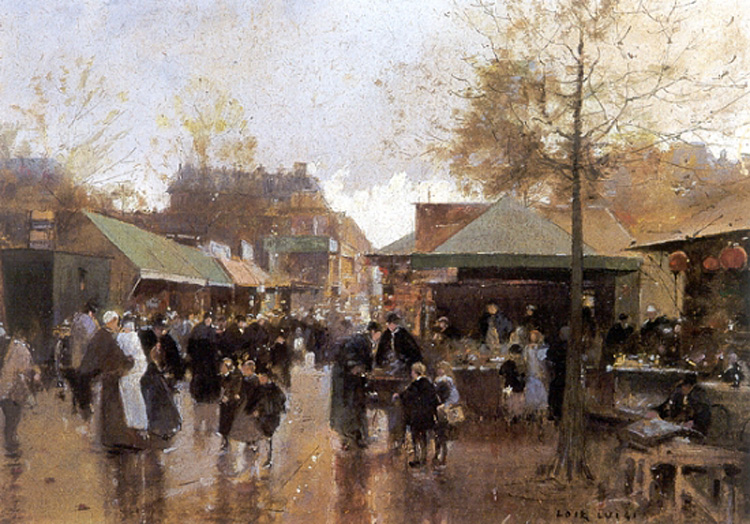
The marché aux puces, Porte de Clignancourt, by François-Joseph Luigi Loir.

The station was opened on 21 April 1908 as part of the first section of the line from Châtelet. A terminal loop is provided at the station for trains to turn around to return south towards Bagneux-Lucie Aubrac. Passengers usually detrain at the arrival platform and then the train proceeds empty via the loop to the departure platform. Beyond the turning loop lie a series of storage sidings and the main depot for Line 4 in Saint-Ouen.

Clignancourt was an ancient hamlet that belonged to the abbey of Saint-Denis, and was annexed to Paris in 1860. The term "porte" refers to a gate of the Thiers Wall built to defend Paris between 1841 and 1844 and demolished in the 1920s.

Porte de Clignancourt is also one end of Route nationale 14, which links Paris to Rouen.

The station lies just inside the city limits of Paris; to the north of the station is the commune of Saint-Ouen. Thus a short walk from the station is the marché aux puces de Saint-Ouen (48.90372°N 2.3398°E), a flea market founded in 1885. Nearby is the Cimetière de Saint-Ouen, a Roman Catholic cemetery associated with Joan of Arc.

In 2018, 8,050,206 travelers entered this station, which places it at the 30th position of metro stations for its usage.

== Passenger services ==
=== Access ===
The station has three accesses that lead to Nos 79, 80bis and 82 Boulevard Ornano.

=== Station layout ===
Street Level

| B1 | Mezzanine for platform connection |

| Line 4 platform level | Side platform with PSDs, doors will open on the right |
| Line 4 platform level | Northbound | ← Alighting passengers only |
| Line 4 platform level | Southbound | toward Bagneux–Lucie Aubrac (Simplon) → |
| Line 4 platform level | Side platform with PSDs, doors will open on the right |

=== Platforms ===
Porte de Clignancourt is a standard configuration station. It has two platforms separated by metro tracks and the roof is elliptical. The decoration is in the style of green Ouï-dire. The lighting strip is of the same color, supported by false curved consoles. The direct lighting is white while the indirect lighting, projected on the vault, is multicolored. The white ceramic tiles are flat and cover the walls, the roof, the tympans and the outlets of the corridors. The advertising frames are green and cylindrical and the name of the station is written in capital letters on enamelled plates. The platform towards Montrouge, known as the departure platform, is equipped with sit-stand seats and individual gray benches. The other platform, known as the arrival platform, is devoid of seats.

=== Bus and other connections ===
The station is served by Lines 56, 85, 137, 166, 255 and 341 of the RATP Bus Network and, at night, by Lines N14 and N44 of the Noctilien network.

The station is also in correspondence with the T3b line of the Ile-de-France tramway since the extension of the latter to the Porte d'Asnières on November 24, 2018.
