= Barrière d'Enfer =

Buildings in Paris

Gate of Hell
- Barrière d'Enfer
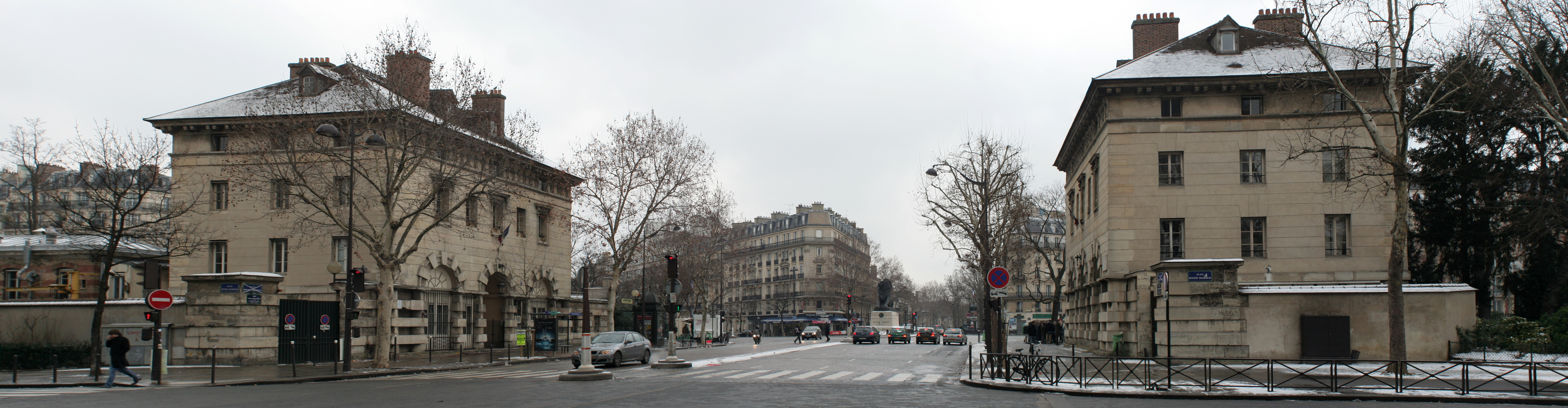
- The two buildings that comprise the Barrière d'Enfer
- Interactive map of Gate of Hell
- Location: Paris, France
- Coordinates: 48°50′02″N 2°19′56″E
- Designer: Claude Nicolas Ledoux
- Type: Toll Gate
- Completion date: 1787

The Barrière d'Enfer (French pronunciation: [baʁjɛʁ dɑ̃fɛʁ], lit. 'Gate of Hell') is a pair of tollhouses in Paris that once served as a gate through the Wall of the Farmers-General (Mur des Fermiers généraux) at the current location of the Place Denfert-Rochereau.

== Origin of name ==
The name "Barrière d'Enfer" comes from the street "Rue d'Enfer" (now called "Rue Denfert-Rochereau") which leads there after crossing the Rue de Faubourg-Saint Jacques. Some historians think the street was named because it was "a place of debauchery and robbery", while others believe that the name comes from a corruption of the Latin via inferior (in contrast with Rue Saint-Jacques, which was known as the via superior). According to Michel Roblin, the name may be derived from the nickname en fer ("of iron") given to a door on the Wall of Philip II Augustus.

== History ==
The two neo-classical pavilions that make up the Barrière were built in 1787 by the architect Claude Nicolas Ledoux, both of which exist still. The buildings are decorated by friezes depicting dancers sculpted by Jean Guillaume Moitte. The tollhouses were designed for collecting the octroi, or taxes on goods entering the city.

The main streets originating from the Barrière d'Enfer were the Boulevard d'Enfer (now a part of the Boulevard Raspail), the Rue d'Enfer, and the Boulevard Saint-Jacques.

The third act of the opera La Bohème by Giacomo Puccini portrays Mimi approaching the Barrière d'Enfer from the Paris side to visit a tavern.

The Barrière is also mentioned in Victor Hugo's novel Les Misérables:

How did those children come there? Perhaps they had escaped from some guardhouse which stood ajar; perhaps in the vicinity, at the barrière d'Enfer, or on the esplanade de l'Observatoire, or in the neighboring carrefour, dominated by the pediment on which could be read: invenerunt parvulum pannis involutum ["they discovered the infant wrapped in swaddling clothes"], there was some mountebank's booth from which they had fled […].

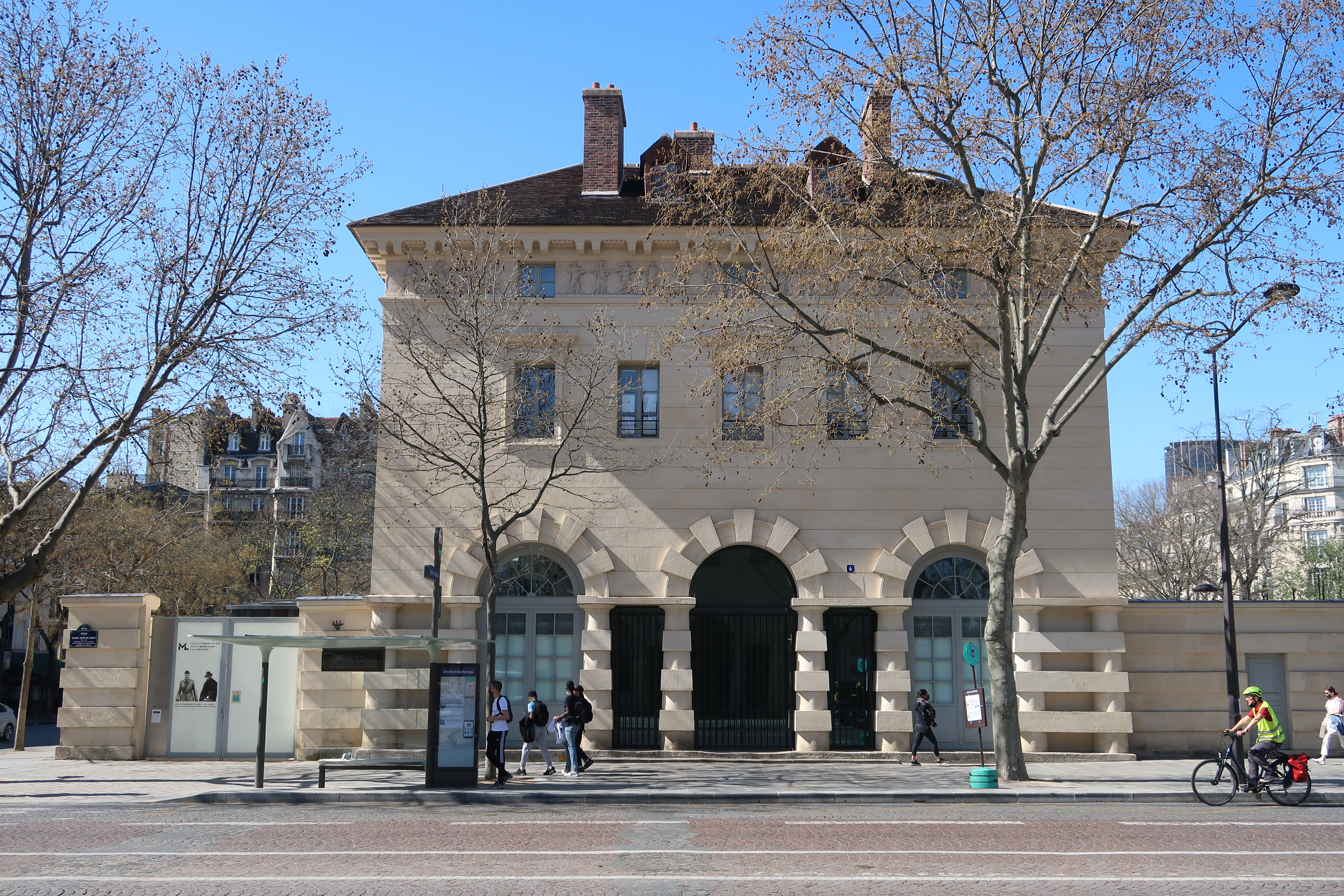
One of the buildings that defines the Barrière d'Enfer.

== Description ==
The Barrière consists of two identical buildings on either side of the Avenue du Colonel-Henri-Rol-Tanguy, which is itself located along the axis of the Avenue Denfert-Rochereau and Avenue du Général-Leclerc.

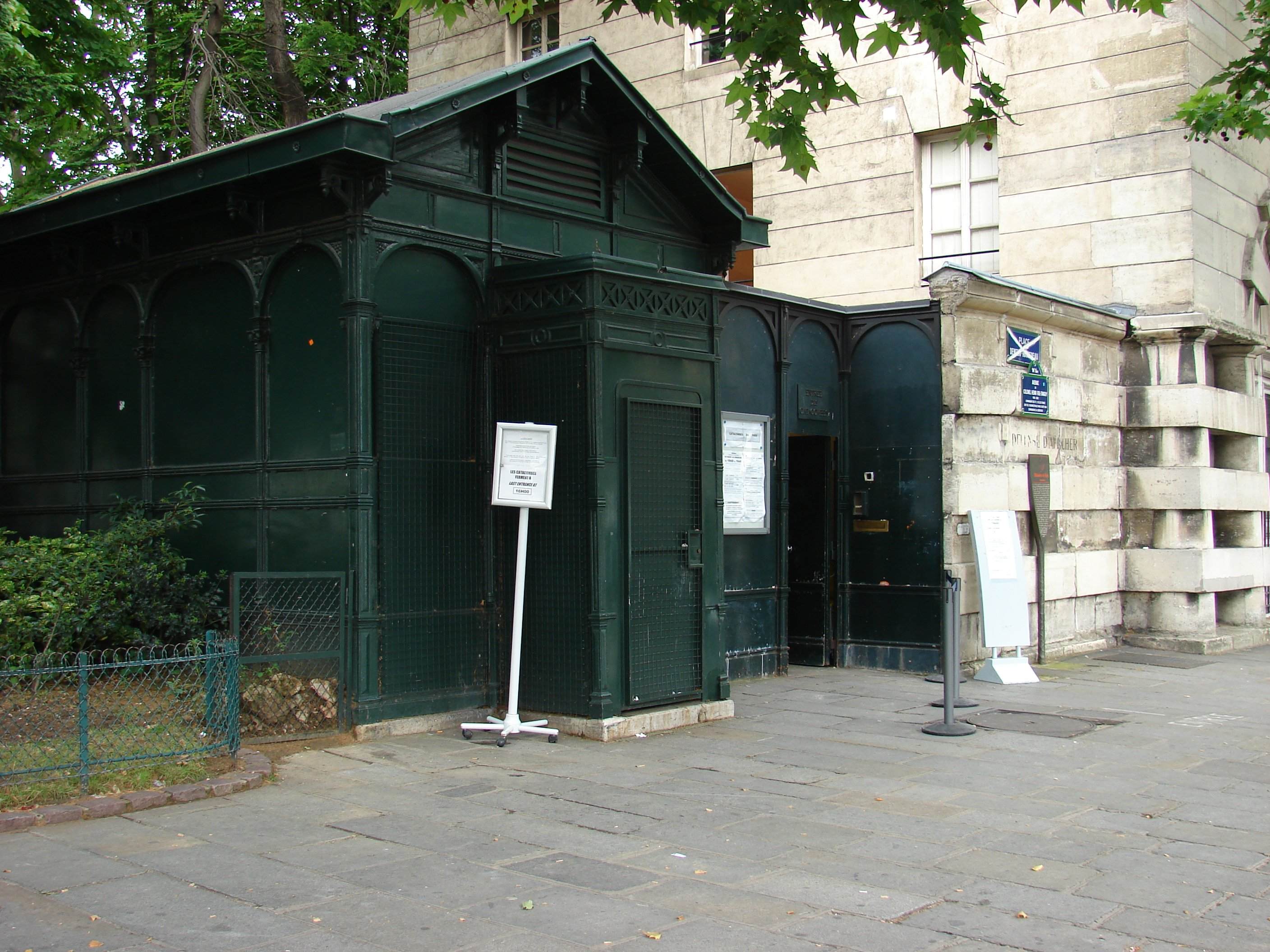
The entrance to the catacombs at the eastern pavilion.

- No. 3 (the eastern building) is the building of the Inspector General of Quarries. The entrance to the Catacombs of Paris is located next to building No. 1.
- No. 4 (the western building) houses of the Highway Service. Beneath the building starting in August 1944 were the headquarters of Colonel Henri Rol-Tanguy, from which he gave orders pertaining to the French Resistance and the Liberation of Paris.

In commemoration of this, a portion of the Place Denfert-Rochereau between the two buildings was renamed avenue du Colonel-Henri-Rol-Tanguy on the 15th of March 2004, on the sixtieth anniversary of the Liberation of Paris.

== See also ==
- Barrière du Trône

== Notes ==
This article was translated largely from corresponding material on fr:Barrière d’Enfer.
