= City gates of Paris =

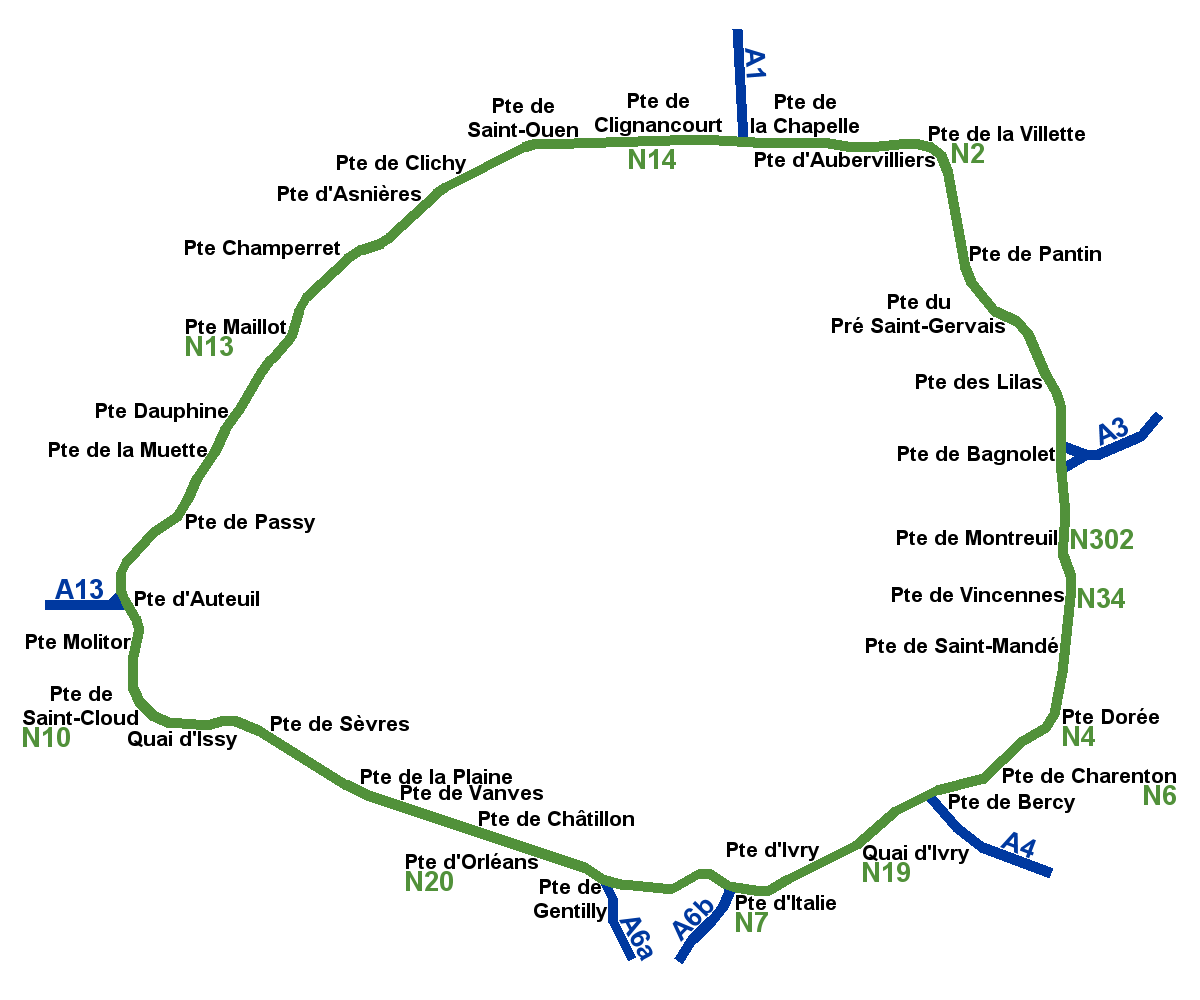
Principal Parisian city gates

While Paris is encircled by the boulevard périphérique (Paris ring road), the city gates of Paris (French: portes de Paris) are the access points to the city for pedestrians and other road users. As Paris has expanded through the centuries, former city gates are found inside the modern city.

== The city gates of today ==
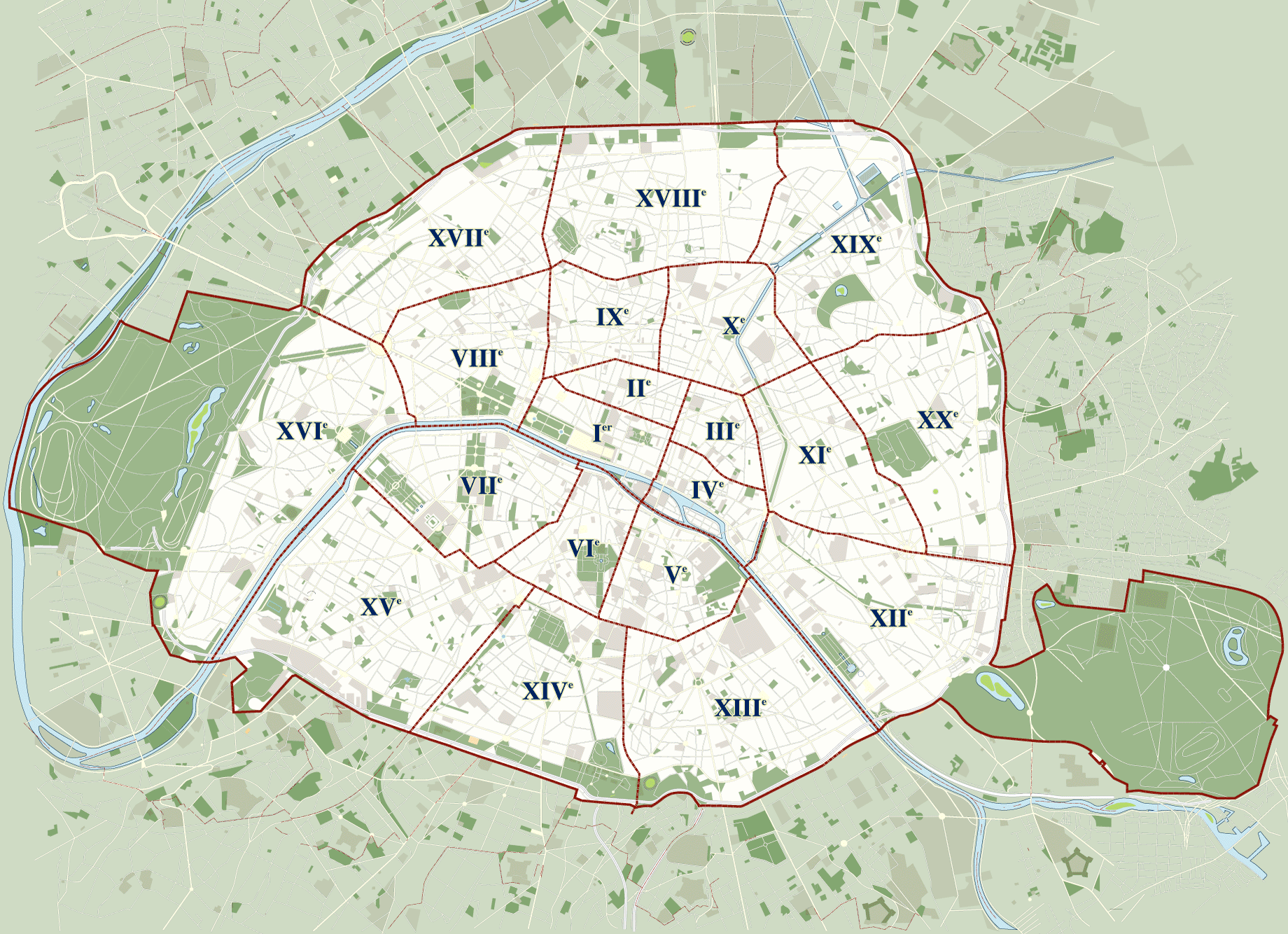
Arrondissements de Paris

(List of city gates created during the extension of Paris in 1860 and which have left their mark on the city map. The gates are listed in clockwise sequence starting in the north at la Route Nationale 1.)

=== North-east ===
==== 18e est ====
- Porte de la Chapelle: route nationale 1 (route départementale 931), autoroute A1

==== 19e ====
- Porte d'Aubervilliers: route nationale 301 (route départementale 901)
- Porte de la Villette: route nationale 2 (route départementale 932)
- Porte de Pantin: route nationale 3 (route départementale 933)
- Porte Chaumont
- Porte Brunet
- Porte du Pré-Saint-Gervais
- Porte des Lilas

=== East ===
==== 20e ====
- Porte des Lilas
- Porte de Ménilmontant
- Porte de Bagnolet: autoroute A3
- Porte de Montreuil: route nationale 302 (route départementale 902)

==== 12e ====
- Porte de Vincennes: route nationale 34 (route départementale 120)
- Porte Jaune
- Porte du Bel-Air
- Porte de Saint-Mandé
- Porte de Montempoivre
- Porte Dorée or "Porte de Picpus"
- Porte de Reuilly
- Porte de Charenton: route nationale 6 (route départementale 6)
- Porte de Bercy: autoroute A4

=== South (rive gauche) ===
==== 13e ====
- Porte de la Gare
- Quai d'Ivry
- Porte de France
- Porte de Vitry
- Porte d'Ivry
- Porte de Choisy: route nationale 305 (route départementale 5)
- Porte d'Italie: route nationale 7 (route départementale 7)
- Poterne des Peupliers
- Porte de Gentilly

==== 14e ====
- Porte de Gentilly
- Porte d'Arcueil
- Porte d'Orléans: route nationale 20 (route départementale 920)
- Porte de Montrouge
- Porte de Châtillon
- Porte Didot
- Porte de Vanves

==== 15e ====
- Porte Brancion
- Porte de Plaisance
- Porte de la Plaine
- Porte de Versailles
- Porte d'Issy
- Porte de Sèvres
- Porte du Bas-Meudon (quai d'Issy)

=== West ===
==== 16e ====
- Porte du Point-du-Jour
- Porte de Saint-Cloud: route nationale 10 (route départementale 910)
- Porte Molitor
- Porte de Boulogne
- Porte de l'Hippodrome
- Porte d'Auteuil: autoroute A13
- Porte de Passy
- Porte de la Muette
- Porte Dauphine
- Porte de la Seine
- Porte de Bagatelle
- Porte de Madrid
- Porte Saint-James
- Porte de Neuilly
- Porte des Sablons
- Porte Maillot

=== North-west ===
==== 17e ====
- Porte Maillot: route nationale 13
- Porte des Ternes
- Porte de Villiers
- Porte de Champerret
- Porte de Courcelles
- Porte d'Asnières
- Porte de Clichy
- Porte Pouchet

==== 18e ====
- Porte de Saint-Ouen
- Porte de Montmartre
- Porte de Clignancourt: route nationale 14 (route départementale 14)
- Porte des Poissonniers

== Ancient gates of Paris ==
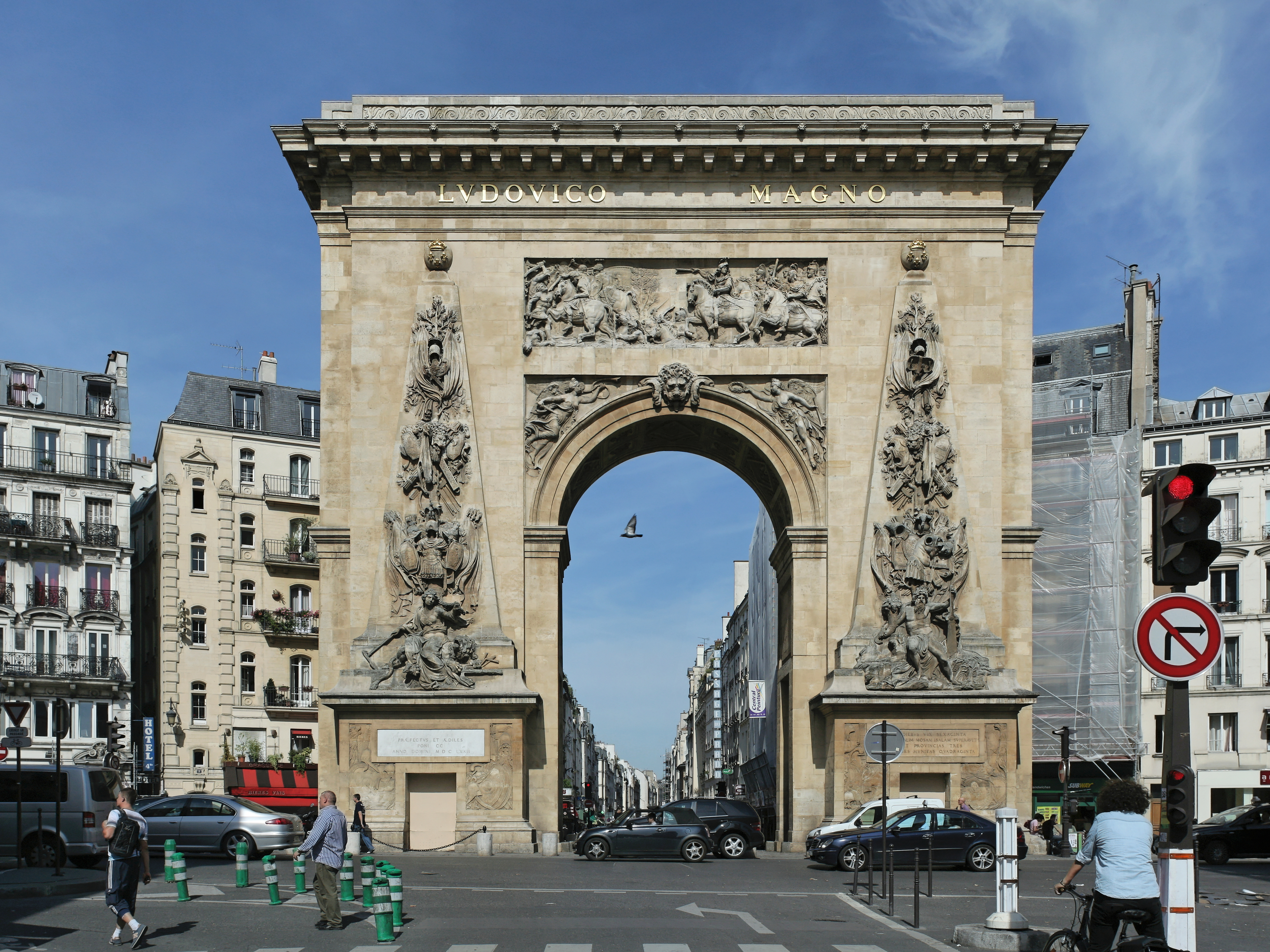
Porte Saint-Denis, one of the ancient gates of the former city walls of Paris.

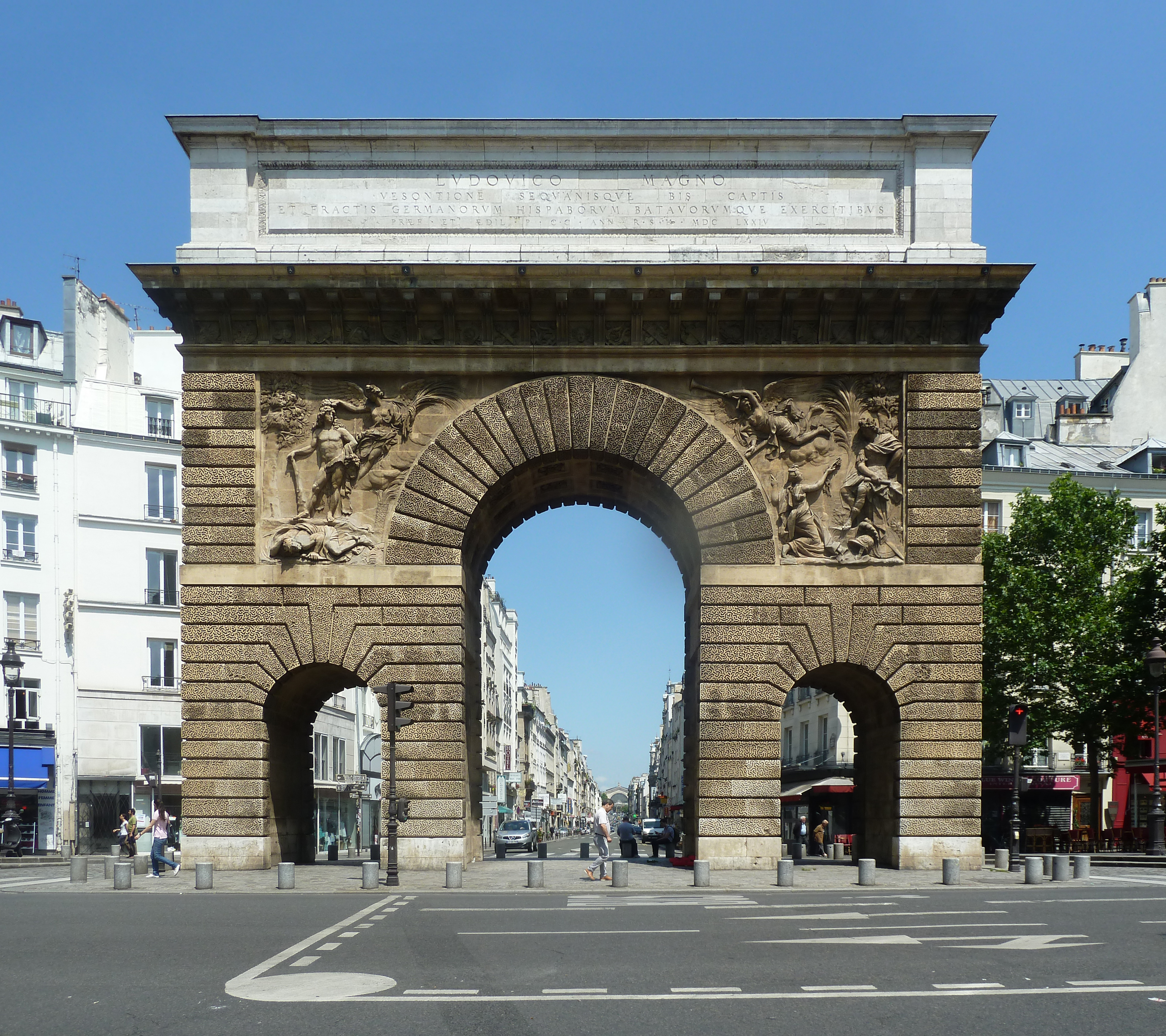
Porte Saint-Martin, Paris, one of the ancient gates of the former city walls of Paris.

- Porte Saint-Denis along the route of the wall of Charles V.
- Porte Saint-Martin along the route of the wall of Charles V.
- Rue des Fossés-Saint-Bernard
- Rue des Fossés-Saint-Jacques
- Rue des Fossés-Saint-Marcel

After the construction of the Wall of the Farmers-General in 1785, the gates of Paris were known as barrières (barriers) until 1860 (e.g. barrière de la Villette, barrière du Trône, barrière d'Italie, etc.) They were toll gates used for collection of the octroi, an excise tax assessed on goods entering the city. Some of the toll booths built by Ledoux remain:

- Rotonde de la Villette at Place de Stalingrad
- Place du Trône
- Place Denfert-Rochereau (formerly barrière d'Enfer)

== See also ==
- Boulevards of the Marshals
- City walls of Paris
- Enceinte
