= Cécile Rol-Tanguy =

French Resistance hero (1919–2020)

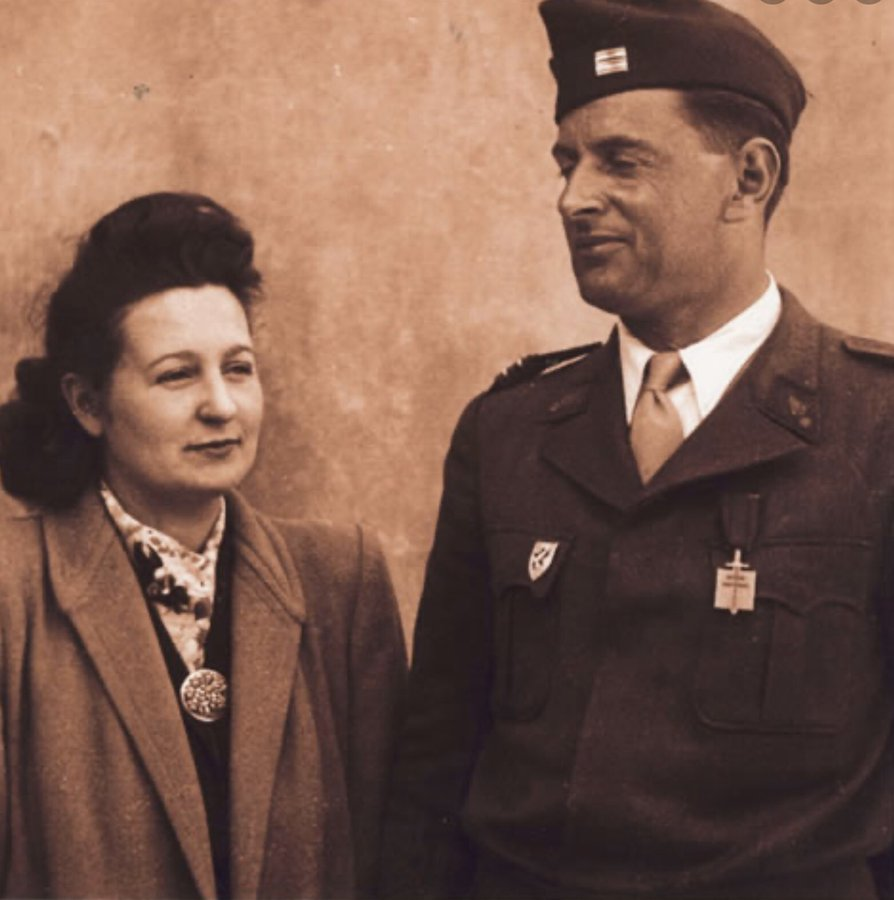
- Cécile Rol-Tanguy and her husband Henri
- Born: Marguerite Marie Cécile Le Bihan; 10 April 1919; Royan, Charente-Maritime, France
- Died: 8 May 2020 (aged 101); Monteaux, Loir-et-Cher, France
- Citizenship: French
- Political party: French Communist Party
- Spouse: Henri Rol-Tanguy (m. 1939; died 2002)

Cécile Rol-Tanguy (French pronunciation: [sesil ʁɔl tɑ̃ɡi]; née Le Bihan; 10 April 1919 – 8 May 2020) was a French communist who was a Resistance agent in World War II. She participated in the liberation of Paris when she served as a secretariat and liaison officer, conducting clandestine operations and relaying confidential communications.

== Early life and family ==
Cécile Rol-Tanguy was born Cécile Le Bihan on 10 April 1919 in Royan, Saintonge. Her father, François Le Bihan was an electrician and an important member of the Confédération Générale du Travail Unitaire (CGTU). She grew up in a highly politicised family, as her father co-founded the Parti Communiste Français (PCF) and had hosted a number of foreign communist agitators who were exiled from their countries.

In 1936, she became a part of the Comité d'Aide à l'Espagne Républicaine, where she met Henri Tanguy, who was 11 years her senior and a fellow communist. During the early stages of their relationship, he volunteered in the International Brigades fighting in the Spanish Civil War. Shortly after their meeting, Henri deployed to the French Section of the International Brigade in the Spanish Civil War.

Rol-Tanguy had four surviving children: Hélène and Jean, who were born during the war, and Claire and Francis, who were born after the war. She and her husband later left Paris to settle by the Loire.

== Career ==
=== Early career ===
Before turning 18, Rol-Tanguy was a shorthand typist in the Confédération Générale du Travail (CGT) and joined the Union des Jeunes Filles de France, a subgroup of the Fédération des Jeunes Communistes de France. It is within this framework that she became part of the Comité d'Aide à l'Espagne Républicaine, where she met Henri Tanguy. In 1938, she joined the Parti Communiste and was engaged to Henri upon his return from Spain. They would be married in 1939 after learning she was pregnant. Her first child, Françoise, was born in November of that year, but fell ill shortly after and died from dehydration on 12 June 1940, 2 days before the Germans entered Paris. During an interview in 2014, she recalled the painful episode: “I can still remember the terrible pall of burning smoke over Paris and wondering if that was what had made my baby ill. I left her in the hospital overnight, and when I went back the next day, there was another baby in her bed.” Her father was arrested for his activism and communist affiliation around the same time, as his actions were seen as “demoralizing the army,” and deemed illegal.

=== During the Occupation ===
On the first day of the occupation of Paris the CGT, which was by now banned by the Vichy Government, asked Rol-Tanguy to resume work. Feeling that she had nothing to lose following the imprisonment of her father and the death of her daughter, she accepted and began typing political pamphlets for them. After her father's release from prison, she moved in with her parents, living in a tiny studio and often struggling to get enough to eat. She worked alongside her husband, who had joined the Forces Françaises de l’Intérieure (FFI). Rol-Tanguy was an important member of the FFI, and worked as both a liaison officer and secretary for them.

Rol-Tanguy and her husband were forced to hide both their identities and their relationship during this period due to the secrecy required of them as members of the Résistance. She used code names like Jeanne, Yvette or Lucie when on missions as a liaison officer, and sometimes disguised herself by changing her hairstyle. After the birth of their second child, Henri asked her to consider working elsewhere and leave their daughter with her mother, in order to avoid the possibility of them both being caught. She refused and continued her work, sometimes using her children's strollers to conceal guns, grenades, and clandestine newspapers. In 1942, her father was arrested a second time and deported to Auschwitz, where he died shortly after.

=== Liberation of Paris ===
Together with her husband, Rol-Tanguy actively participated in the liberation of Paris. In May 1944, under the pseudonym Rol, Henri was appointed regional leader of the FFI, and for several weeks he worked to organize the Liberation of the French capital. She worked with Henri and his staff to set up a command post in an underground shelter in Place Denfert-Rochereau. From this covert command post, the Rol-Tanguy couple received and distributed information and orders for the Résistance. On 19 August 1944 she and Henri published a pamphlet calling citizens in Paris to arms and decreeing general mobilisation. This marked the beginning of the end of the Nazi occupation. Rol-Tanguy described their roles at this time, saying:

"Henri was circulating a lot at that time, I was stuck down there to relay the communiqués.”

Paris was finally liberated on August 25 by General Leclerc's 2nd Armoured Division. Rol-Tanguy recalls this overwhelming experience, saying that,

"When they told us, we didn't hear the bells ringing, but we had a pillow fight with the girls who were with me."

== Later life ==
After the liberation in 1945, Rol-Tanguy received the Resistance Medal from the French Committee of National Liberation for her contributions to the liberation struggle. Her husband became an officer in the French Army. In memory of all the friends they lost during the war, Cécile and Henri made a pact to remain members of the Parti Communiste Français. After the liberation, she also joined the Union des Femmes Françaises working on maintaining the memory of French resistance and anti-fascist fighters.

On 8 September 2002, after a 63-year marriage, her husband Henri Rol-Tanguy died.

In 2008, Rol-Tanguy became the Grand Officer of the Légion d'honneur. Although she was at first reluctant to take the honorary position, she decided to accept it in the name of all of the female Résistance fighters, who are too often forgotten by history.

Cécile Rol-Tanguy died at her home at midday on 8 May 2020, aged 101, on the 75th anniversary of the end of the Second World War in Europe (VE Day).

== Legacy ==
Rol-Tanguy devoted herself to the memory of the Resistance. She wanted to keep the memory of the past alive in order to protect future generations. "It is out of respect for all those who fell for freedom that I am fulfilling this duty of remembrance," she explained. After the death of her husband in 2002, Rol-Tanguy increased her efforts to commemorate and preserve the memory of those who helped her in the fight to free Paris. She did this through media interviews and by speaking in documentaries. She also spoke at many ceremonies, and frequently travelled to speak at schools throughout France. In these talks she stressed the importance of fighting for one's freedom. She highlighted Spain's plan to tighten abortion laws as a worrying development for women's rights and freedoms. In a speech at a ceremony in Paris, she said, "I am a little surprised to find myself here again 70 years later, but it is to remember all those I knew and who have left.”

Cécile both represented and advocated for the recognition of the role that women played in the resistance. When she received the Légion d'honneur, she added: “With my last nomination for the Legion d’Honneur, I considered that I represented all the women who had nothing.”

Rol-Tanguy also helped to educate people about the history of the resistance struggle by successfully advocating for the reopening of the Musée de la Libération de Paris, which occurred in August 2019. In this process, the museum was moved to the Ledoux Pavilionson on Place Denfert-Rochereau, the location from which she and her husband launched the insurrection that led to the liberation of Paris in late summer 1944.

== Honours and decorations ==
Honours and decorations
National honours
| Ribbon bar | Name | Date | Source |
|---|---|---|---|
| | Grand Cross of the National Order of Merit | 21 November 2017 | |
| | Grand Officer of the National Order of the Legion of Honour | 12 July 2013 | |
| | Commander of the National Order of the Legion of Honour | 11 July 2008 | |
| | Officer of the National Order of the Legion of Honour | 31 December 2002 | |
| | Knight of the National Order of the Legion of Honour | 10 June 1984 | |
Military decorations
| Ribbon bar | Name | | Source |
| | Resistance Medal | | 1945 |

== See also ==
- French Resistance
- German military administration in occupied France during World War II
- List of networks and movements of the French Resistance
- List of people involved in the French Resistance
- Women in the French Résistance
- Vichy France
