= Barrière du Trône =

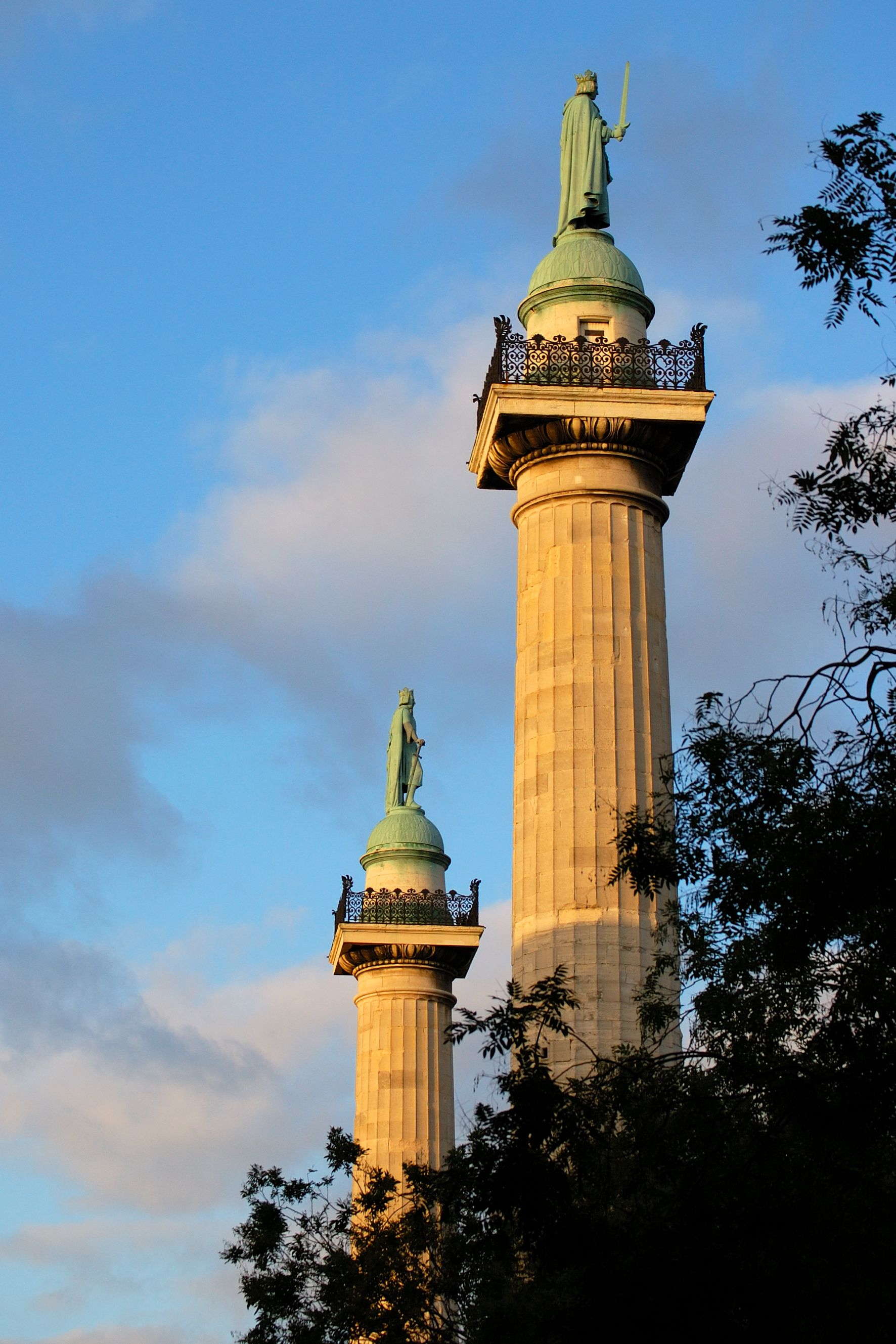
Barrière du Trône near the Place de la Nation

The Barrière du Trône (Trône Gate) was a toll barrier (barrière d’octroi) in the wall of the Fermiers généraux (the tax farmers’ enclosure) that was built around Paris in the 1780s. It was part of a wall that, just prior to the French Revolution, surrounded Paris. The purpose of the wall, which was designed by Claude Nicolas Ledoux, was to facilitate the collection of municipal duties on merchandise entering Paris by reducing smuggling and fraud. It is located in eastern Paris and straddled what is now the 11th arrondissement and the 12th arrondissement. The barrier takes its name from its location on the former Place du Trône, now called place de la Nation.

== Location and layout ==
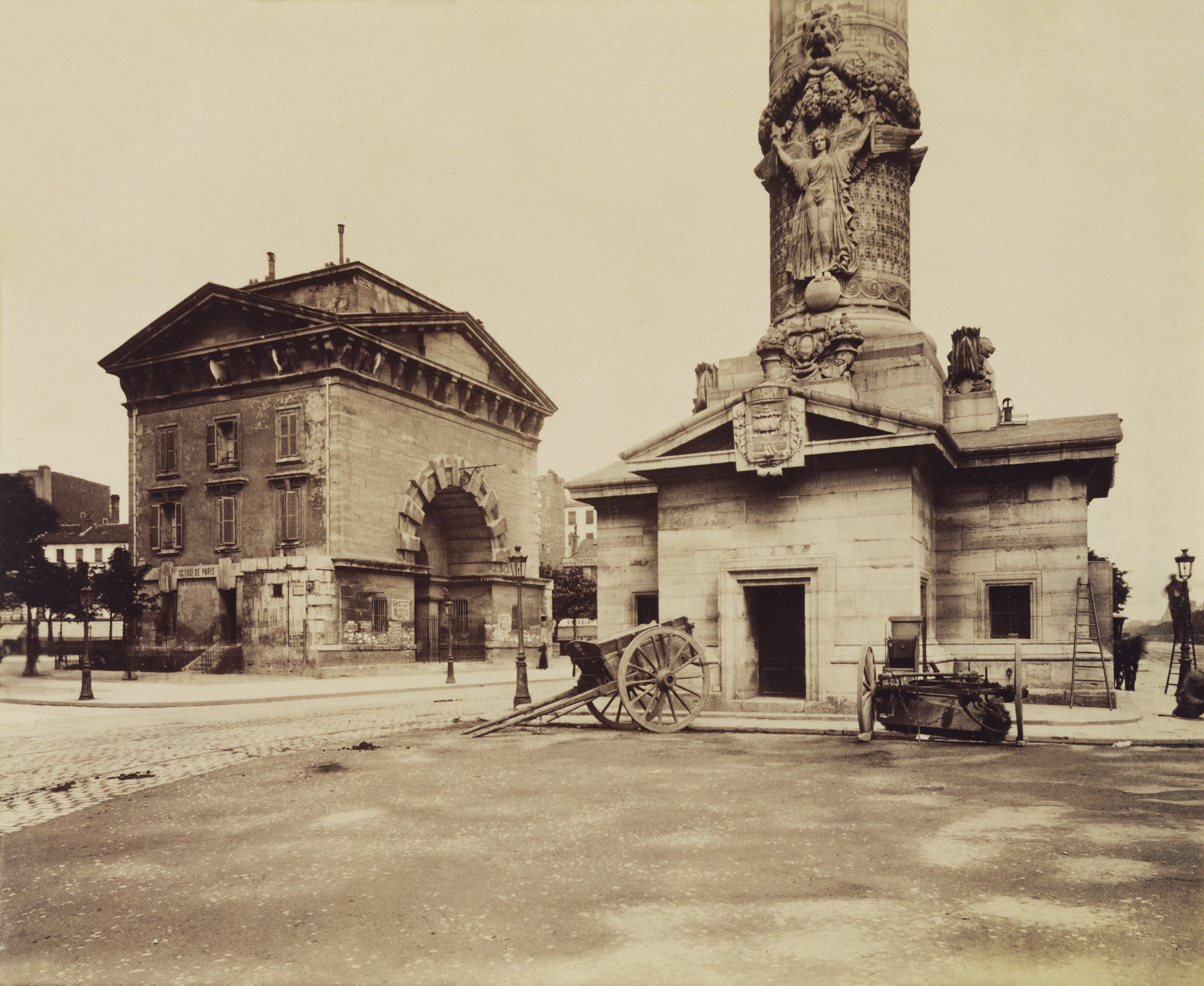
Photo of the barrière du Trône taken by Eugène Atget in 1903 or 1904. Note the guardhouse serving as a pedestal for the column and, on the left, the structure housing tax offices and lodging for personnel.

This barrier was located on what is today the Avenue du Trône, near Place de la Nation (formerly known as Place du Trône). Its purpose was to facilitate the collection of taxes on goods entering the capital. It is one of four extant toll houses from among the 55 built under Ledoux's program (the other three are located at place de Denfert-Rochereau, place de Stalingrad and at an entryway to the Parc Monceau).

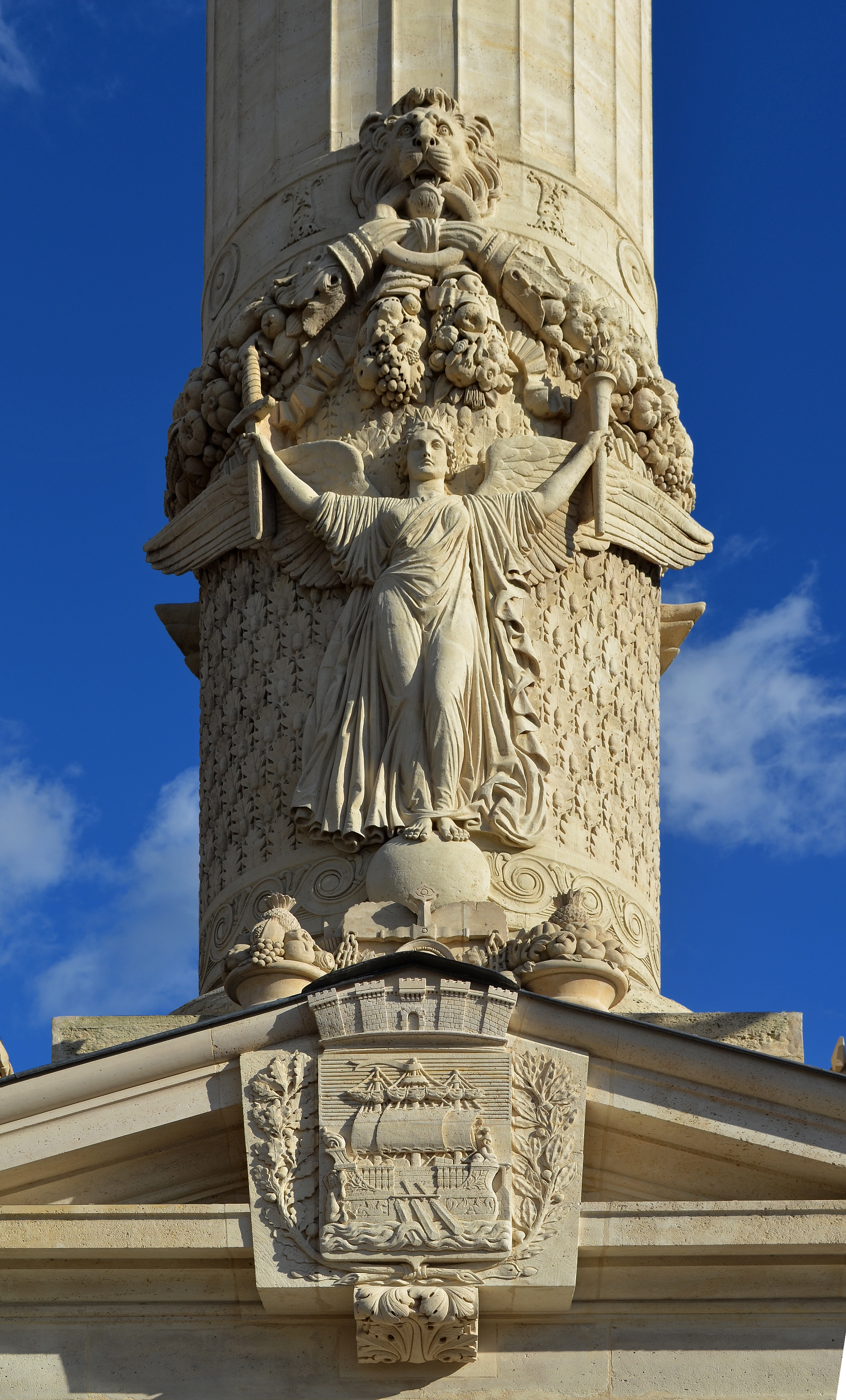
Decoration at the base of one of the columns

The barrière comprised two guardhouses flanking a grille about 60 meters wide. The guardhouses served as pedestals for two columns each 28 meters in height. On its eastern side, two identical toll houses on either side of the avenue du Trône housed offices and lodgings for the octroi officials. The barriére du Trône follows a typical plan for such toll houses inasmuch as it consists of two identical and perfectly symmetric houses. The other extant barrière that follows this same plan is the barrière de l’Enfer located at what is now place de Denfert-Rochereau.

Together with the barrière de l’Étoile (which was demolished by Baron Haussmann), the barrière du Trône celebrated a royal entrance (the entry of Louis XIV and Marie-Thérèse of Austria after their marriage) and for that reason was adorned with the additional decoration of two monumental columns.

== History ==
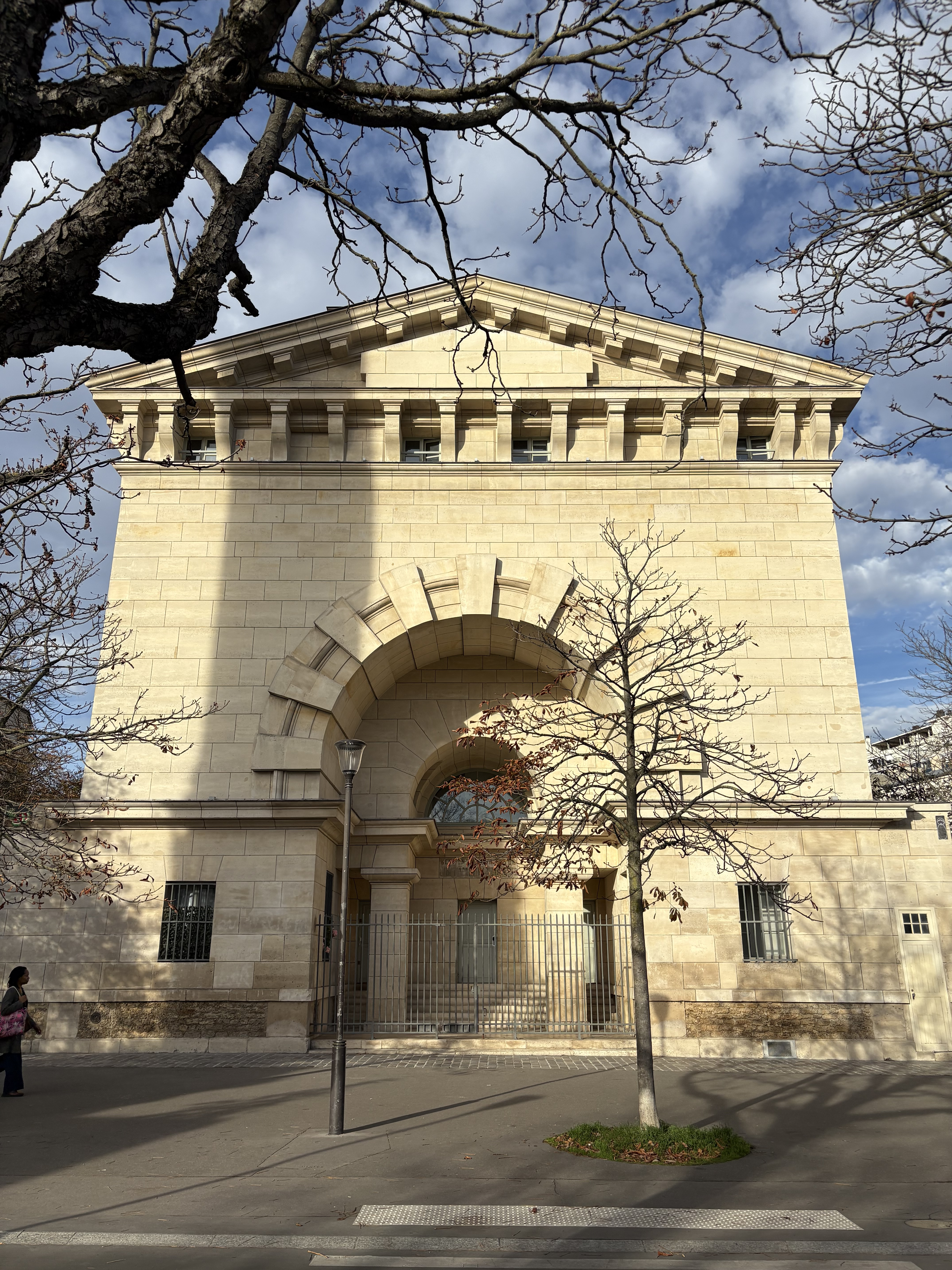
The northern customs house located in the 11th arrondissement

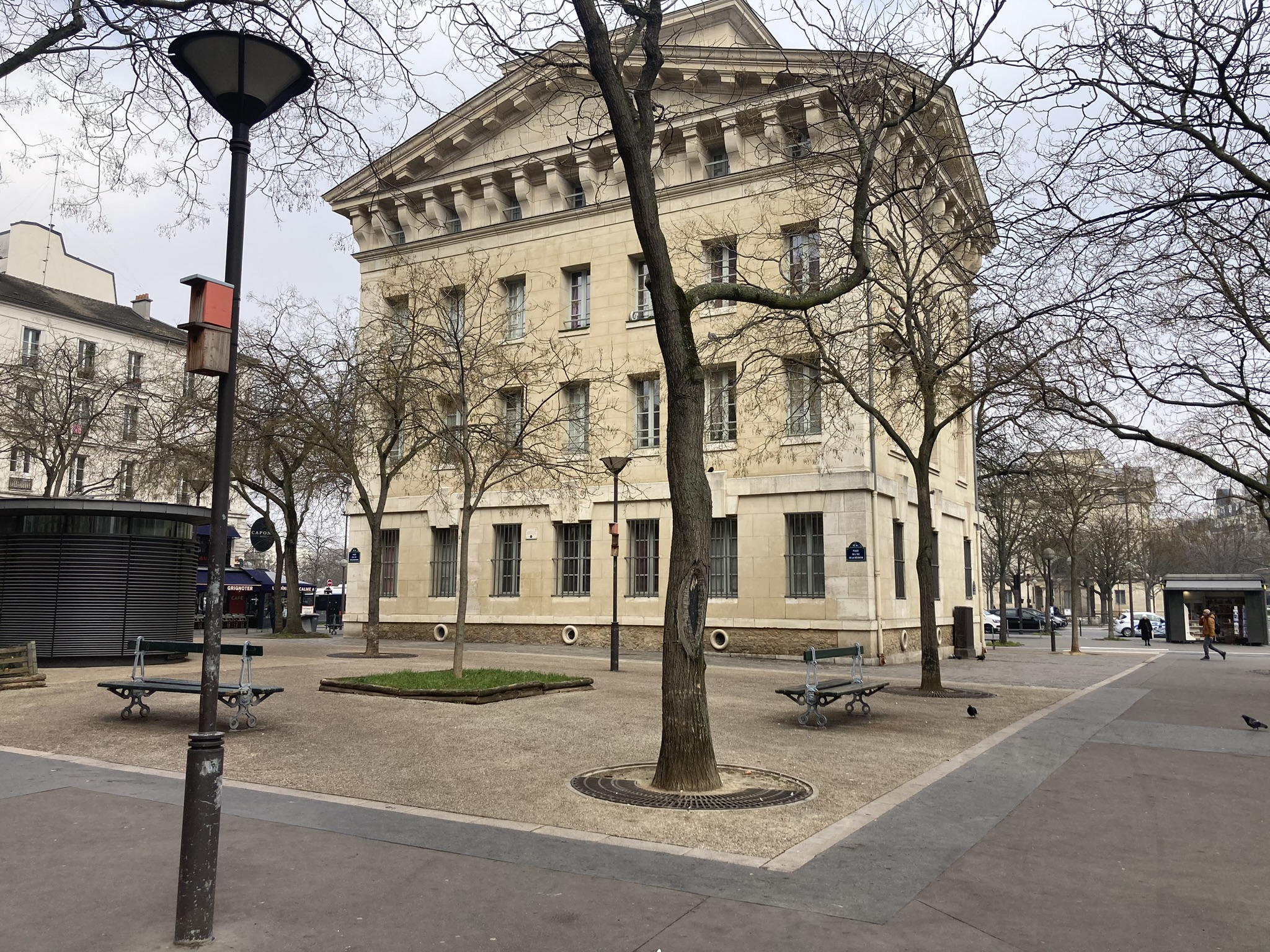
Square behind the southern customs house of the barrière du Trône. This discreet square is the exact location of the guillotine of the Trône.

The barrière du Trône was built in 1787 as part of a broader tax wall project designed by the architect Claude-Nicolas Ledoux. Ledoux spared no expense in the construction of this project, including the barrière du Trône. He was severely criticized during construction and, in May 1789, was dismissed for cost overruns. He spent time in prison during the French Revolution because of his involvement in this project.

During the Reign of Terror, a guillotine was installed next to the southern customs house (in what is now the 12th arrondissement). Of the 2,639 executions carried out in Paris between April 1793 and July 1794, the six weeks of operation of this guillotine in June and July 1794 accounted for almost half (1306 executions). The bodies were sent to mass burial pits located in what is now known as the Picpus Cemetery, which was only a few hundred meters away. This relatively remote location was chosen because the Reign of Terror was becoming increasingly unpopular with the French public and Revolutionary authorities needed an out-of-the-way place to operate the guillotine and dispose of the bodies.

In 1845, the columns were topped with two statues of French kings (each 3.8 m high): Philippe Auguste sculpted by Auguste Dumont on the south (12ᵉ arrondissement) and Saint Louis by Antoine Étex on the north (11ᵉ arrondissement).

The barrier was classified as a historical monument on 24 April 1907.

By 2002, the columns were in a severely degraded state. Between July 2008 and July 2010, restoration work took place including removal and renovation of the bronze statues and replacement of many of the lower stones of the column shafts.

Since 1993, the pavilions have housed social housing managed by Paris Habitat. Their façades and roofs were restored in 2016.
