= Wall of the Fermiers généraux =

18th-century city wall of Paris

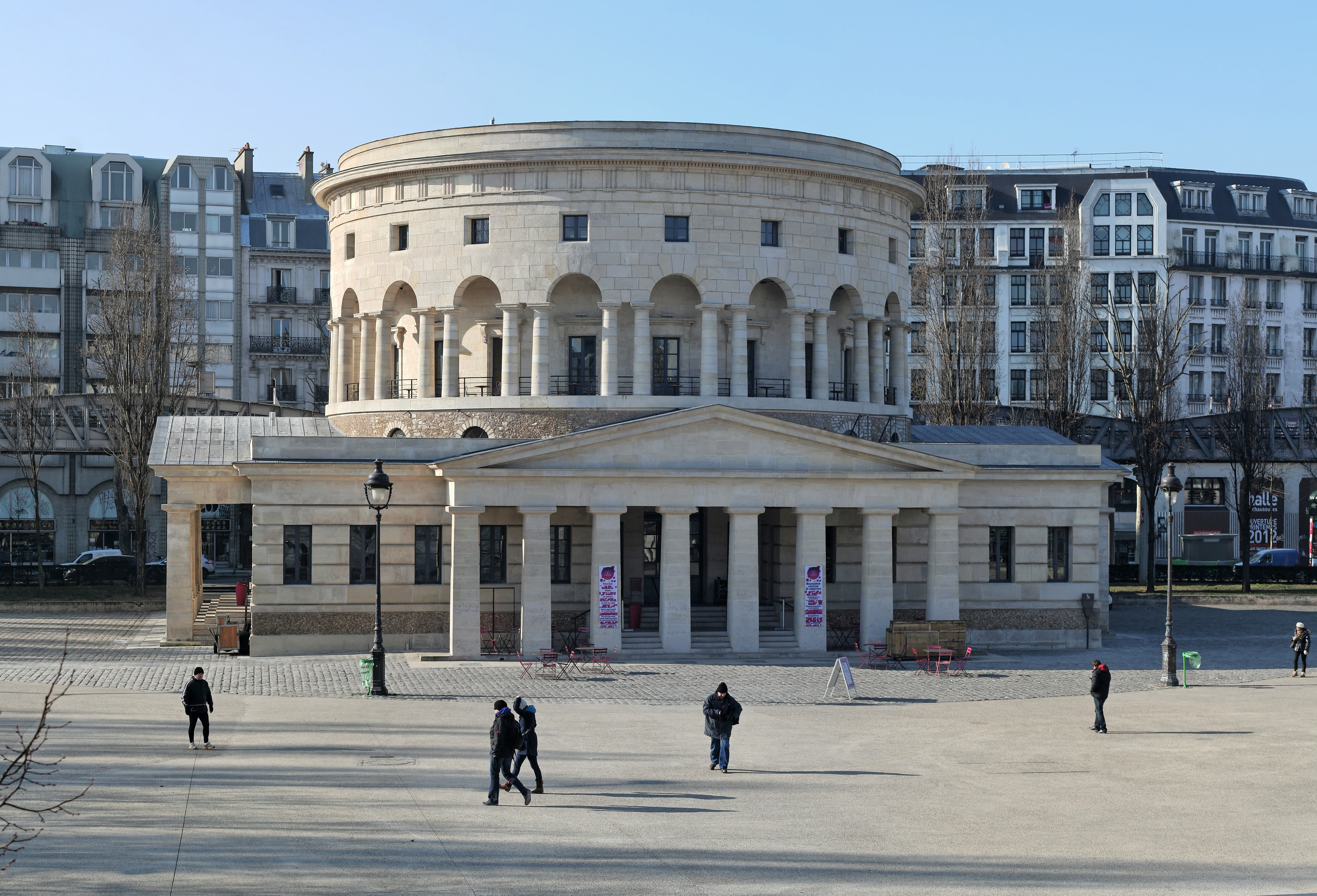
Claude Nicolas Ledoux's Rotonde de la Villette at Place de Stalingrad

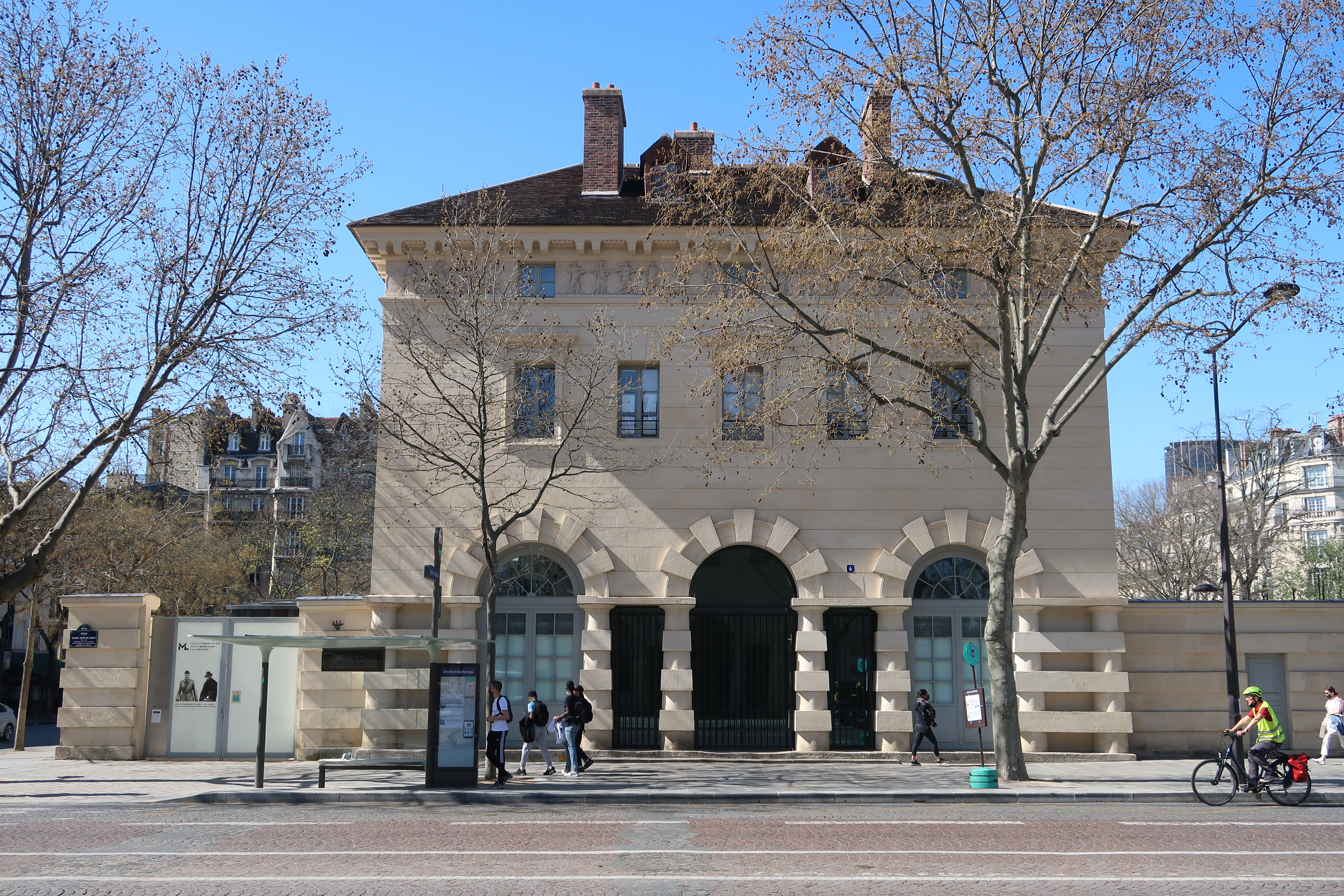
One of the two customs houses at the barrière d'Enfer, now Place Denfert-Rochereau

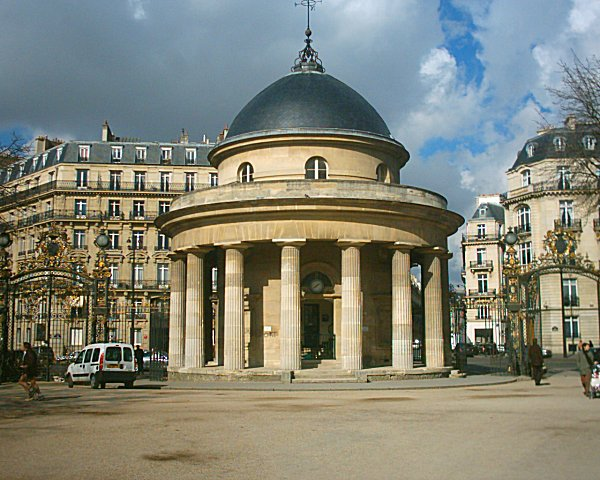
Rotunda in the parc Monceau, Barrière de Chartres

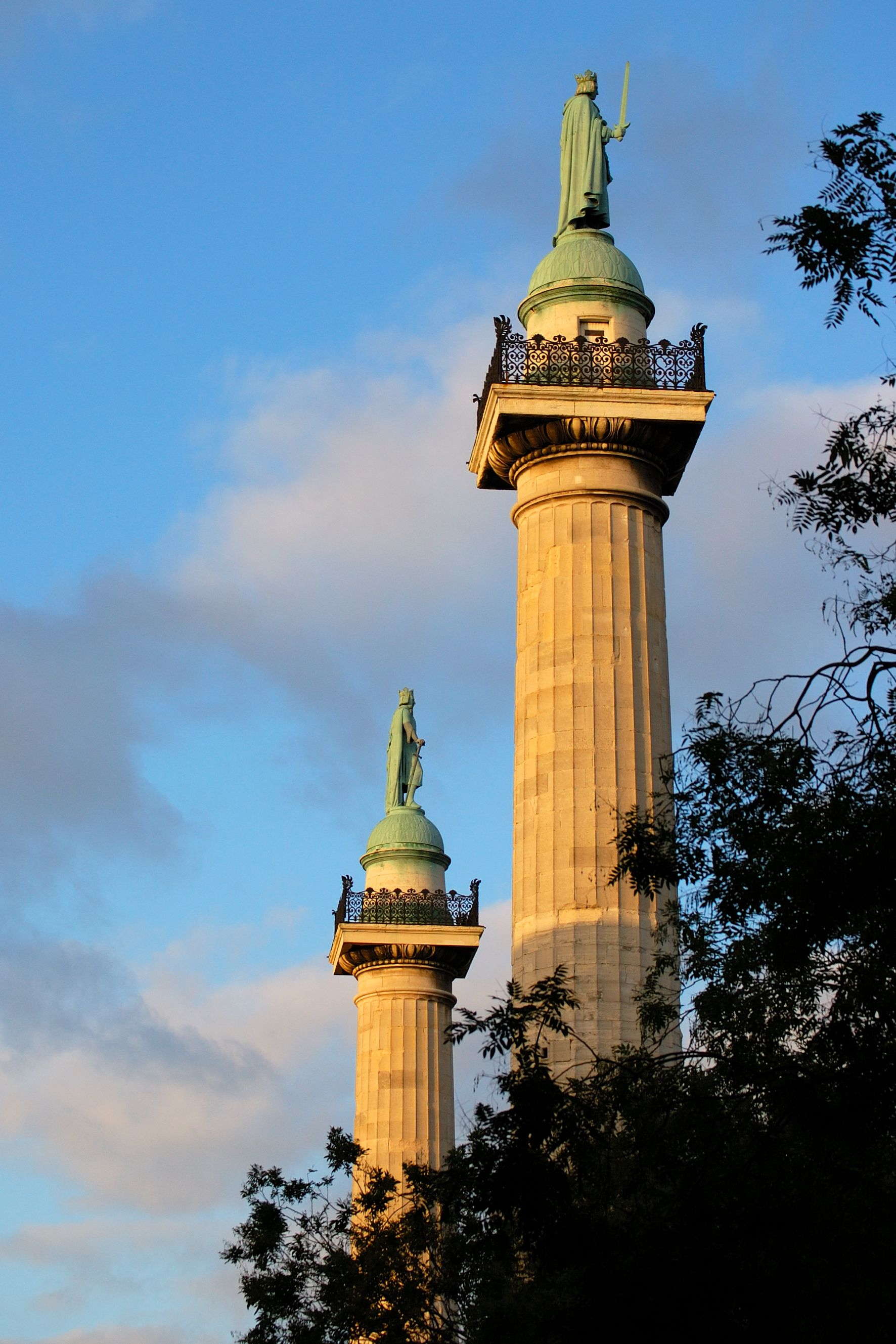
Barrière du Trône near the Place de la Nation

The wall of the Fermiers généraux (French: mur des Fermiers généraux, pronounced [myʁ de fɛʁmje ʒeneʁo]) was one of the several city walls of Paris built between the early Middle Ages and the mid 19th century. The purpose of the wall of the Fermiers généraux was to facilitate collection of municipal taxes on merchandise entering Paris.

Built between 1784 and 1791, the 24 km (15 mi) wall crossed the districts of the Place de l'Étoile, Batignolles, Pigalle, Belleville, Nation, the Place d'Italie, Denfert-Rochereau, Montparnasse and the Trocadéro, roughly following the route now traced by line 2 and line 6 of the Paris Métro. The wall was demolished in the early 1860s, although elements of some of its barrières or custom houses remain.

== History ==
Unlike earlier walls, the Fermiers généraux wall was not intended to defend Paris from invaders but to enforce the payment of a toll on goods entering Paris ("octroi"). In France’s ancien régime, the Ferme générale (General Farm) was essentially an outsourced customs, excise and indirect tax operation. It collected duties on behalf of the King (plus hefty bonus fees for the collectors), under renewable six-year contracts. The major tax collectors in this highly unpopular tax farming system were known as the fermiers généraux (singular fermier général), which would be tax farmers-general (Note: The English word "farmer" in the sense of "agricultural producer" is derived from the French word fermier which means "leaseholder" (of an agricultural business or any other thing). Initially the word "farmer" designated in England only those agricultural producers who were not the owners of the land they were cultivating. Subsequently "farmer" became the generic term of all agricultural entrepreneurs, whether they owned the cultivated soil or not.) in English.

The wall was commissioned by the nobleman and scientist Antoine Lavoisier. In addition to being a famous chemist, Lavoisier was an extremely rich shareholder and Administrator of the Ferme générale. He determined that the cost of building, staffing, and maintaining the wall would be compensated by better revenue collection. Indeed, tax evasion and smuggling posed major problems for the Ferme générale.

Architect Claude Nicolas Ledoux designed the wall. He had the support of Charles Alexandre de Calonne, Louis XVI's Controller-General of Finances. Both Ledoux and Calonne harbored the ambition of leaving a lasting mark on the city of Paris. Accordingly, Ledoux spared no expense in building the wall's 55 gates (barrières). These included 43 luxurious customs houses built in a neo-classical style that Ledoux baptized ‘les Propylées de Paris’ (from the Greek propylaeum, a monumental gateway to a sacred enclosure).

Construction began on the left bank in 1784 and on the right bank in 1787. Cost overruns were enormous. Given the economic context, these overruns were particularly problematic because France was experiencing a severe financial and political crisis. A commission was formed in 1787 to provide an external audit of the project. Its findings were alarming – the Commission found, for example, that, while the estimated cost of the two customs houses at the place de l'Etoile was 96,000 pounds, the true total cost of construction was 500,000 pounds. Likewise, the cost of the two custom houses at what is now place d'Italie was originally estimated to be 110,000 pounds, but the final cost was more than 400,000 pounds. In 1787, the Finance Minister, Loménie de Brienne, was concerned about the high cost of the wall and considered stopping the work, but never did so. However, Ledoux was dismissed by Jacques Necker in May 1789, just prior to the start of the French Revolution.

The wall was severely criticized as it was being built. The Parisian writer (and tax critic) Louis-Sébastien Mercier, who witnessed the construction, dubbed the buildings "dens of the Tax Department metamorphosed into palaces with columns." The wall's tax-collection function also made it unpopular with the general public: for example, Beaumarchais’ play on words of the time went Le mur murant Paris rend Paris murmurant ("The wall walling Paris keeps Paris murmuring"). Beaumarchais also penned the following epigram:

Pour augmenter son numéraire (To increase its cash)

Et raccourcir notre horizon (And to shorten our horizon),
La Ferme a jugé nécessaire (The Ferme judges it necessary)

De mettre Paris en prison (To put Paris in prison).

During the outbreak of the French Revolution in July 1789, the wall was attacked and the interiors burned at the barrières de Blanche, Trois Frères and Saint-Georges. In the early years of the Revolution, with the Wall scarcely finished, tax farming and the toll on goods were abolished. Ledoux was imprisoned by Revolutionary authorities as punishment for building the wall but was ultimately released.

In 1798 French municipalities were again granted the octroi, which soon became their primary source of revenue. The city of Paris consequently assumed responsibility for maintaining the Wall and staffing its revenue officials. When in 1860 the suburban communes were annexed to Paris, the customs boundary moved out to the Thiers fortifications, with duties collected at its numerous gates (portes).

The wall, having become obsolete from a fiscal point of view, was demolished in less than a month in January 1860. The pavilions were sold at auction in January 1861. No public outcry arose in favor of their preservation. The Italian Gate, initially used by the municipality of the 13th arrondissement, was demolished in 1877. Under Haussmann's program of renovation of Paris, a series of boulevards was built over the wall’s path.

Only four customs houses have survived to this day. They are: the barrière de Chartres near the Parc Monceau, the barrière Saint-Martin at place de Stalingrad, the barrière du Trone at the place de la Nation and the barrière d'Enfer at the place Denfert-Rochereau.

Municipal customs duties were collected until the 1940s.

== Physical layout ==
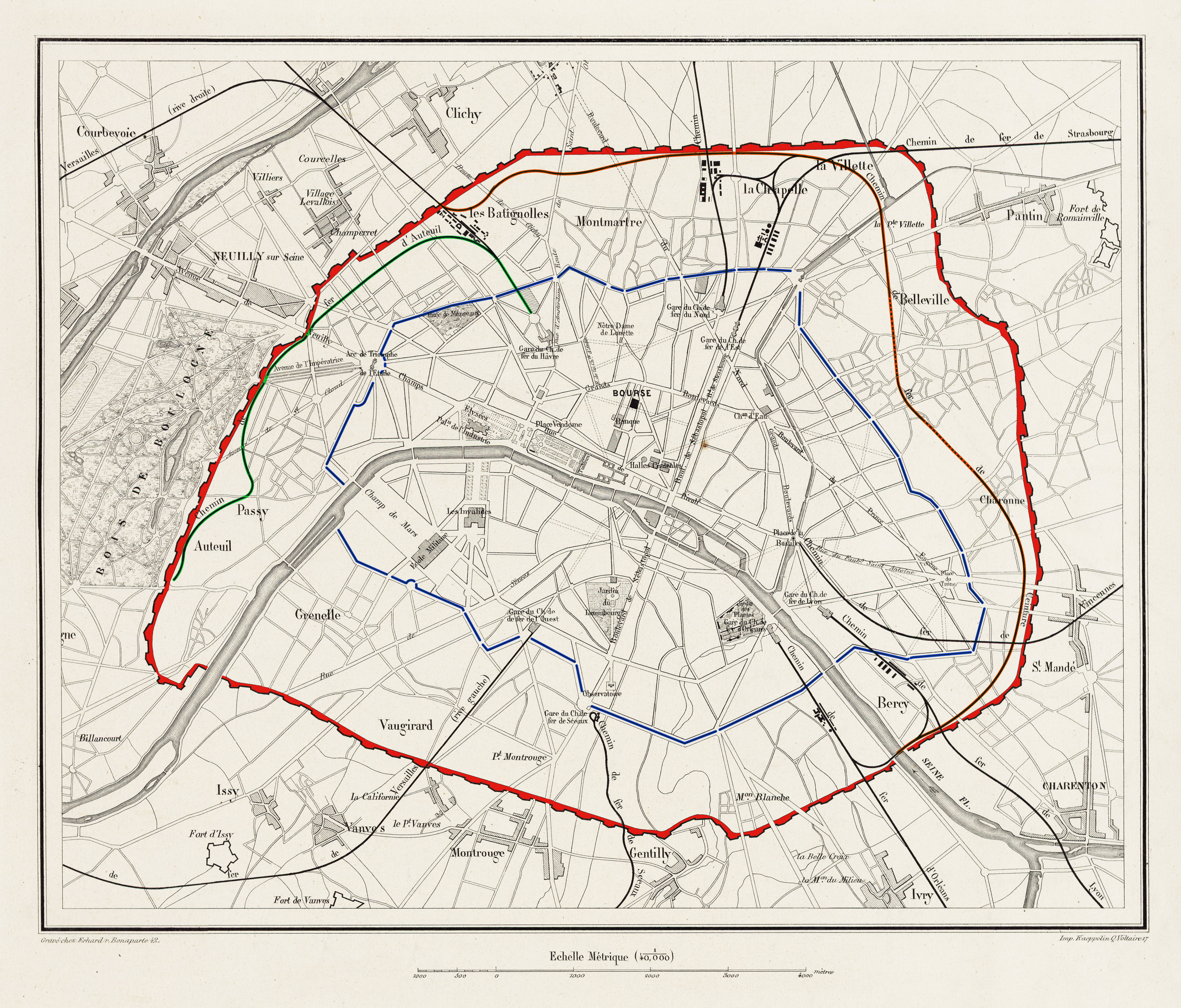
Paris in 1859. Wall of the Fermiers généraux (blue line). Thiers fortifications (red line).

The Wall was slightly more than 3 metres (9 ft 10 in) high and 24 km (15 mi) long, following the then-boundaries of the city of Paris. No buildings could be erected within 98 metres (322 ft) of its exterior or within 11 metres (36 ft) of its interior. The outside of the wall was flanked by boulevards. Along the inside, surveillance by customs officials was facilitated by a raised protected walkway (chemin de ronde), except between the barrière d'Italie (now the Place d'Italie) and the barrière d’Enfer (now the Place Denfert-Rochereau).

When the entire wall was functioning in 1790, it included 55 barrières or custom houses. These facilities were spaced at an average distance of a little more than 400 metres (1,300 ft). The buildings were designed as places for collecting taxes but also as lodging for the employees of the Ferme. Of the 55 barrières, 13 consisted of two identical and symmetric buildings (examples of this design can be seen today at the two extant barriers at place de la Nation and place Denfert-Rochereau). Some of the barriers did not have tax collection offices – they functioned only as observation posts from which suspicious activities could be reported or acted on.

== Current traces ==
Some portions of the wall still exist, such as the rotunda of the Barrier of La Villette (at Place de Stalingrad), the Barrière du Trône (at Place de la Nation), the Barrière d'Enfer (at Place Denfert-Rochereau), and the rotunda of Parc Monceau. The wall itself was replaced by the route of the following streets:

- On the left (south) bank of the Seine from the east: Boulevard Vincent-Auriol, Auguste-Blanqui, Boulevard Saint-Jacques, Boulevard Raspail, Boulevard Edgar-Quinet, Boulevard de Vaugirard, Boulevard Pasteur, Boulevard Garibaldi and Boulevard de Grenelle.
- On the right (north) bank, from the west: Rue de l'Alboni, Rue Benjamin-Franklin, Avenue d'Iéna, Avenue Kléber, Rue La Pérouse, Rue de Presbourg, Rue de Tilsitt, Avenue de Wagram, Boulevard de Courcelles, Boulevard des Batignolles, Clichy, Boulevard de Rochechouart, Boulevard de la Chapelle, Boulevard de la Villette, Boulevard de Belleville, Boulevard de Ménilmontant, Boulevard de Charonne, Boulevard de Picpus, Boulevard de Reuilly and Boulevard de Bercy.

== Bibliography ==
- Gagneux, Renaud; Prouvost, Denis (2004). Sur les traces des enceintes de Paris. Promenades au long des murs disparus ("Along the walls of Paris. Walking along the lost walls") (in French). Paris: Éditions Parigramme / Compagnie parisienne du livre. ISBN 2-84096-322-1.
- Hillairet, Jacques (1985). Dictionnaire historique des rues de Paris ("Historical dictionary of the streets of Paris" (in French). Les Éditions de Minuit.
- Lazare, Félix and Louis. Dictionnaire administratif et historique des rues de Paris et de ses monuments ("Dictionary of the administration and history of the streets of Paris and its monuments"), 1844–1849 (in French).
- Schama, Simon (1989). Citizens: A Chronicle of the French Revolution. New York: Alfred A. Knopf. ISBN 0-394-55948-7.
- Valmy-Baysse, Jean (1950). La curieuse aventure des boulevards extérieurs ("The curious adventure of the outer boulevards") (in French). Éditions Albin-Michel.
