= Henri Rol-Tanguy =

French Resistance leader (1908–2002)

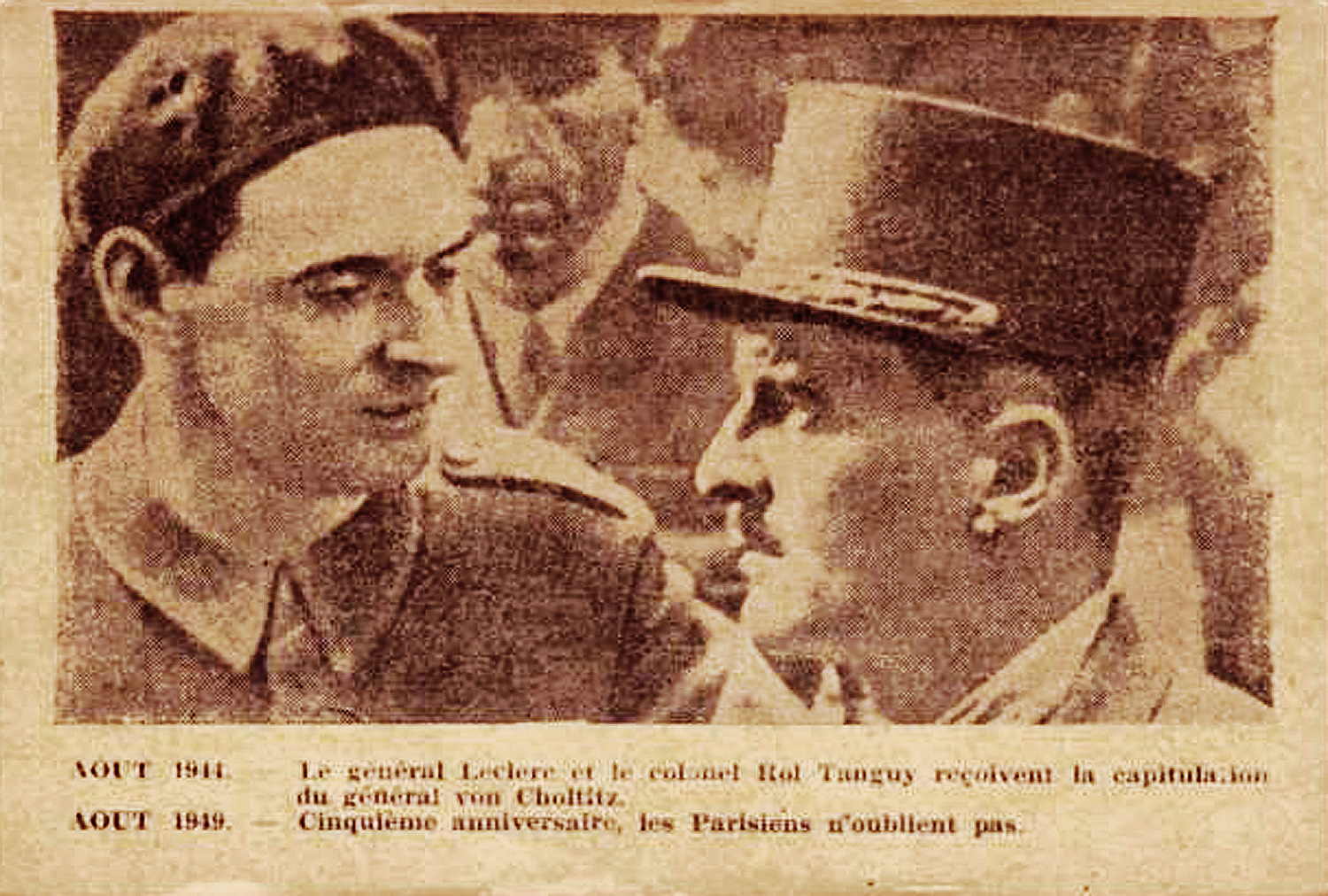
- Colonel Rol-Tanguy (left) and General Leclerc at the surrender of the German garrison in Paris (a contemporary postcard)
- Born: Georges René Henri Tanguy; 12 June 1908; Morlaix, France
- Died: 8 September 2002 (aged 94); Ivry-sur-Seine, France
- Spouse: Cécile Le Bihan (m. 1939)
- Military career
- Allegiance: Spanish Republic; Free France; France
- Branch: International Brigades; French Army
- Service years: 1937-1938; 1940-1962
- Rank: Colonel
- Commands: French Resistance
- Conflicts: Spanish Civil War; World War II
- Awards: Grand Cross of the Legion of Honour

Henri Rol-Tanguy (French pronunciation: [ɑ̃ʁi ʁɔl tɑ̃ɡi]; 12 June 1908 – 8 September 2002) was a French communist and leader in the Resistance against Nazi Germany in World War II. At his death The New York Times called him "one of France's most decorated Resistance heroes".

== Biography ==
Henri Tanguy was born on 12 June 1908 in Morlaix, Brittany to a family of a sailor. Aged 14, he moved to Paris to work as a foundryman. In 1925, he joined the Young Communists and ended up as a secretary. He did his military service in 1929 with the 8th Régiment de Zouaves in Oran, Algeria; on his return, he became an activist with the local metal workers union.

At the outbreak of the Spanish Civil War in 1937, Tanguy joined the International Brigades to fight for the Spanish Republic. He was political commissar of the André Marty Battalion (made up of French and Belgian volunteers) which was part of the XIV International Brigade. He was wounded in the Battle of the Ebro in 1938. After the war, he returned to France.

At the outbreak of World War II, Tanguy was conscripted into the French Army. After the surrender, he went underground with his wife Cécile Le Bihan. He became one of the leaders of communist resistance in Paris and organized a group that became Francs-Tireurs et Partisans (FTP). Tanguy used a nom de guerre of "Colonel Rol", after a close friend who had died in Spain.

In June 1944, Tanguy took command of the French Forces of the Interior in the Île-de-France. When Allied armies approached Paris, these forces took part in the liberation of Paris. Tanguy said, "Paris is worth 200,000 dead, so long as the city frees itself before the Free French armies arrive"

After five days of fighting, German General Dietrich von Choltitz notified Colonel Rol that he was ready to negotiate. Alongside Free French general Philippe Leclerc de Hauteclocque, Tanguy accepted and signed the act of surrender on 25 August 1944. Like many resistance members, Tanguy later added his wartime pseudonym to his official name and became Rol-Tanguy.

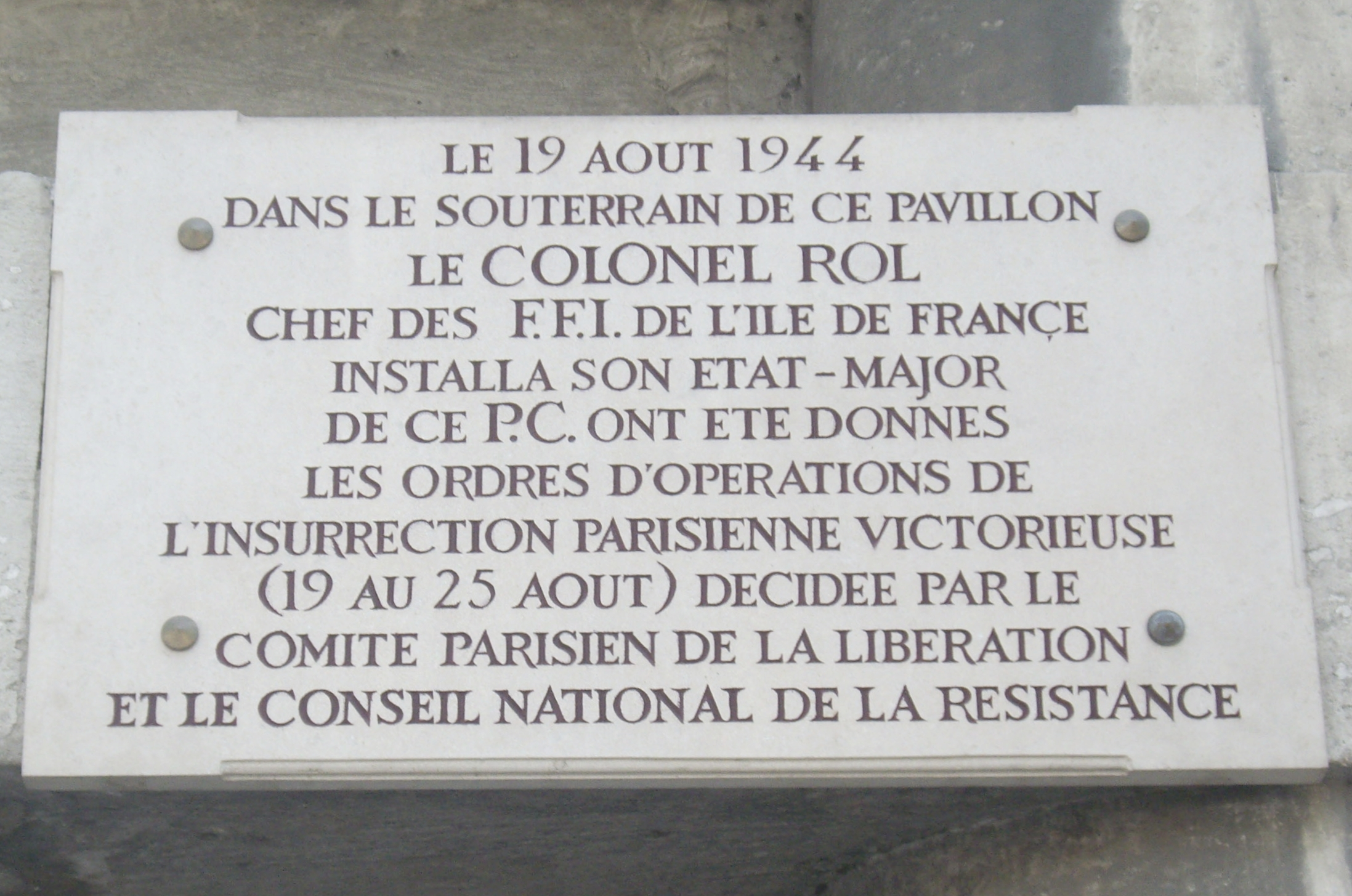
avenue du Colonel-Henri-Rol-Tanguy

Rol-Tanguy joined the French 1st Army of General Jean de Lattre de Tassigny and served during the battles in Germany. After the war, he received the Croix de Guerre, the Médaille de la Résistance and the Ordre de la Libération. He remained in the French army with a permanent commission until 1962.

After his army career, Rol-Tanguy joined the central committee of the French Communist Party where he remained until 1987. He lived in the department of Loir-et-Cher. In 1994, he received the Grand Croix de la Légion d'honneur and, in 1996, received an honorary citizenship from Spain for his part in the International Brigades.

Henri Rol-Tanguy died on 8 September 2002, and received a salutation in the Invalides from Jacques Chirac, the recently re-elected President of France.

In 2004 he was commemorated at Place Denfert-Rochereau, in Paris, with a plaque renaming a part of the place Avenue du Colonel-Henri-Rol-Tanguy, and the metro station there was sub-titled Colonel Rol-Tanguy.
