= Place de la Bataille-de-Stalingrad =

Pedestrian square in Paris

Coordinates: 48°53′01″N 2°22′12″E

The Place de la Bataille-de-Stalingrad is a square in the 19th arrondissement of Paris. It was named after the Battle of Stalingrad (1942–43), one of the major battles of World War II. The square lies at the intersection of the Canal de l'Ourcq and the Canal Saint-Martin.

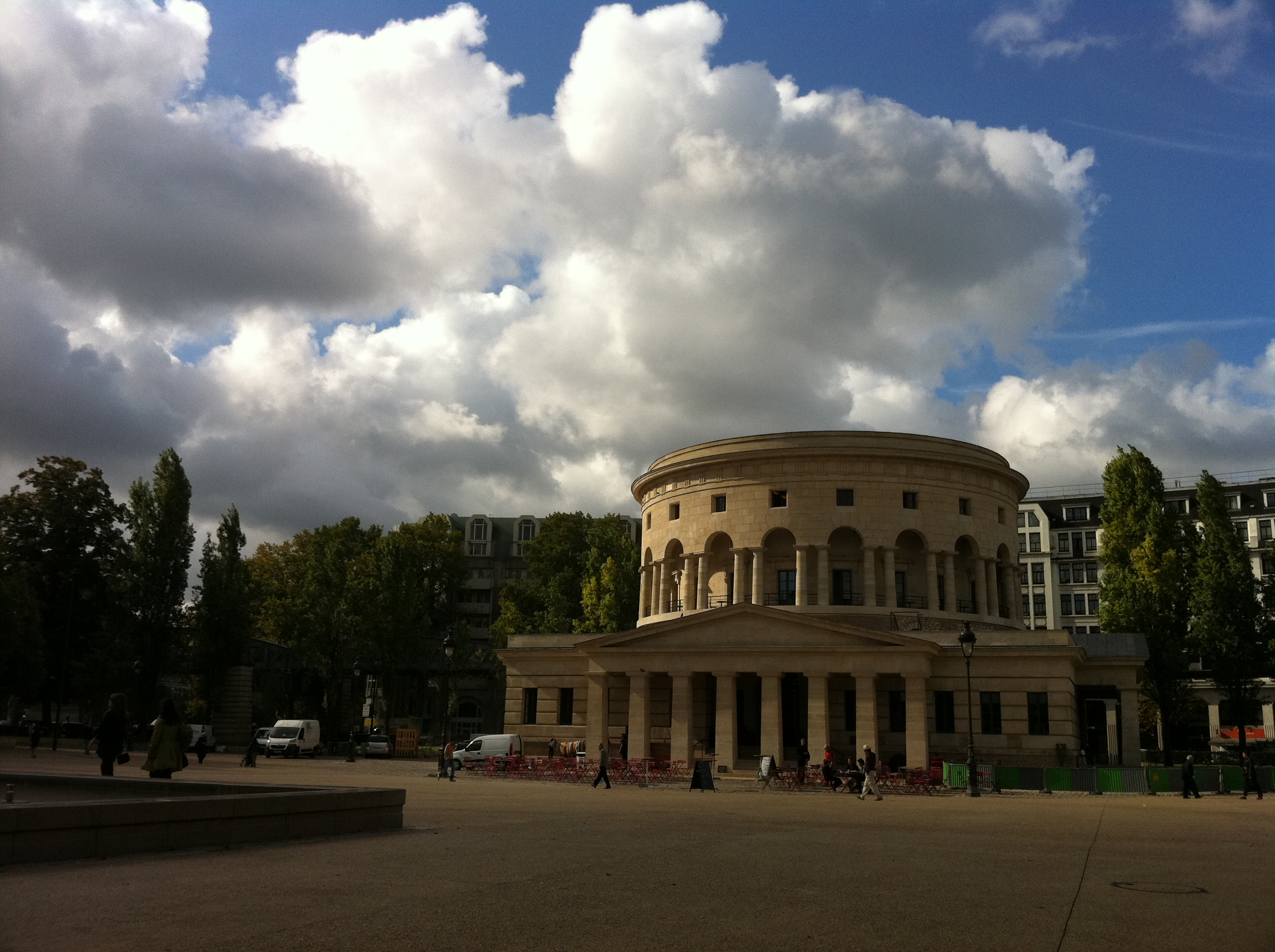
Place de la Bataille de Stalingrad - La Rotonde, a fragment of the Wall of the Ferme générale

The square is the location of the Rotonde de la Villette, a Neoclassical toll house once used to tax goods entering the city.

== History ==
Formerly a part of the Boulevard de la Villette, a square named "Place de Stalingrad" was created in 1945 and served as a bus terminal. In 1993 it was renamed "Place de la Bataille-de-Stalingrad" and in 2006, in the course of major renovation work around the Bassin de la Villette, was completely renovated. Today, it is a pedestrian square and houses two restaurants and a central fountain.
