= Place Denfert-Rochereau =

Public square in Paris, France

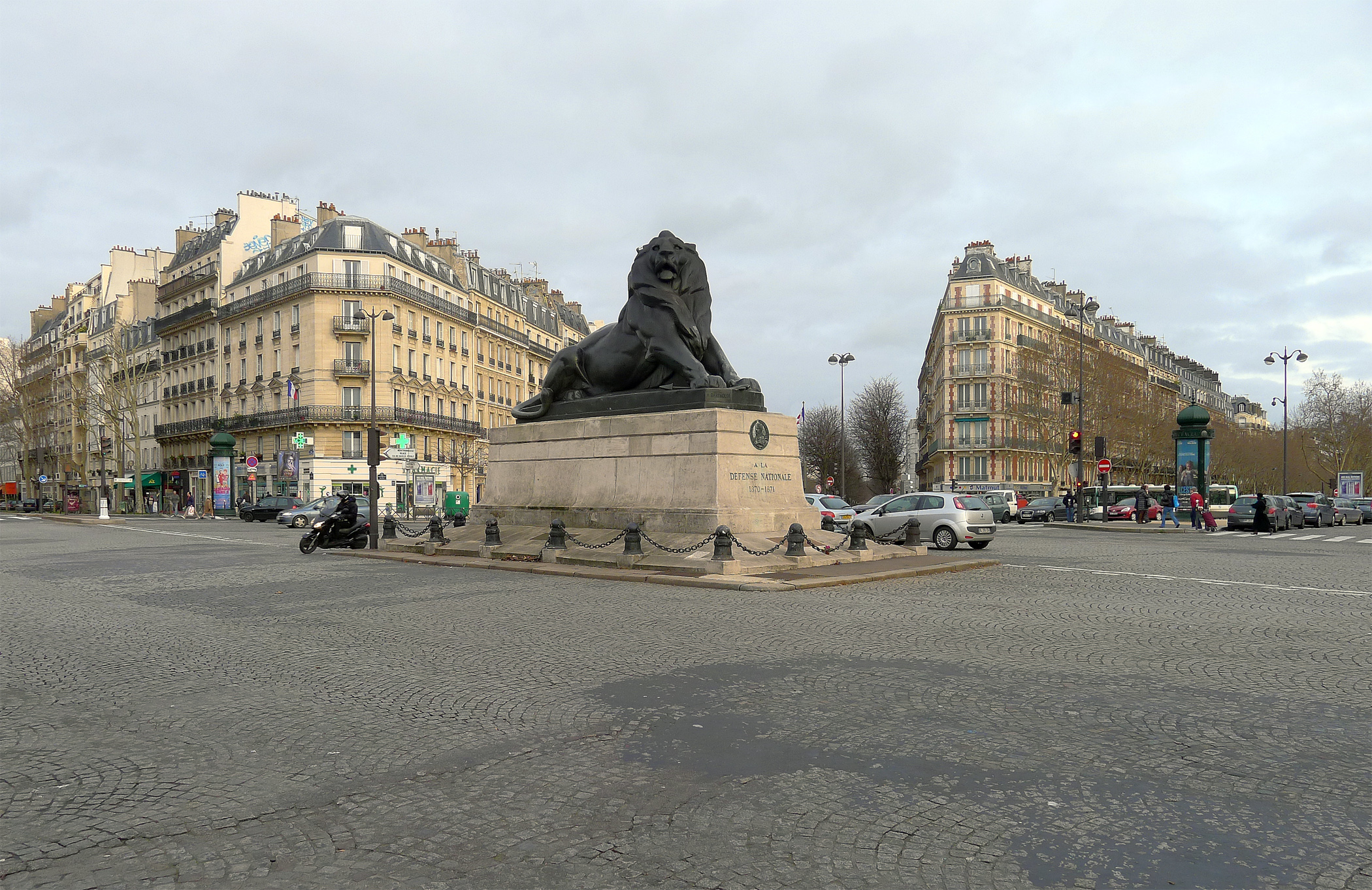
- The Lion of Belfort in the Place Denfert-Rochereau

- Location within Paris
- Length: 220 m (720 ft)
- Width: 145 m (476 ft)
- Arrondissement: XIV
- Quarter: Montparnasse; Petit Montrouge
- Coordinates: 48°50′3.66″N 2°19′56.62″E

Construction
- Completion: 1863
- Denomination: 1879

The Place Denfert-Rochereau (French pronunciation: [plas dɑ̃fɛʁ ʁɔʃʁo]), previously known as the Place d'Enfer, is a public square located in the 14th arrondissement of Paris, France, in the Montparnasse district, at the intersection of the boulevards Raspail, Arago, and Saint-Jacques, and the avenues René Coty, Général Leclerc, and Denfert-Rochereau, as well as the streets Froidevaux, Victor-Considérant and de Grancey. It is one of the largest and most important squares on the left bank of the Seine.

The square is named after Pierre Denfert-Rochereau, the French commander who organized the defense at the siege of Belfort during the Franco-Prussian War (1870–1871). It is dominated by the Lion of Belfort statue (a smaller version of the original in the town of Belfort) by Frédéric Bartholdi.

The square is the location of the Paris Catacombs museum. It is frequently the place where demonstrations and protest marches in Paris either start or end. The square is also the place depicted on the backdrop at the beginning of the third act of La Bohème by Puccini.

== History ==
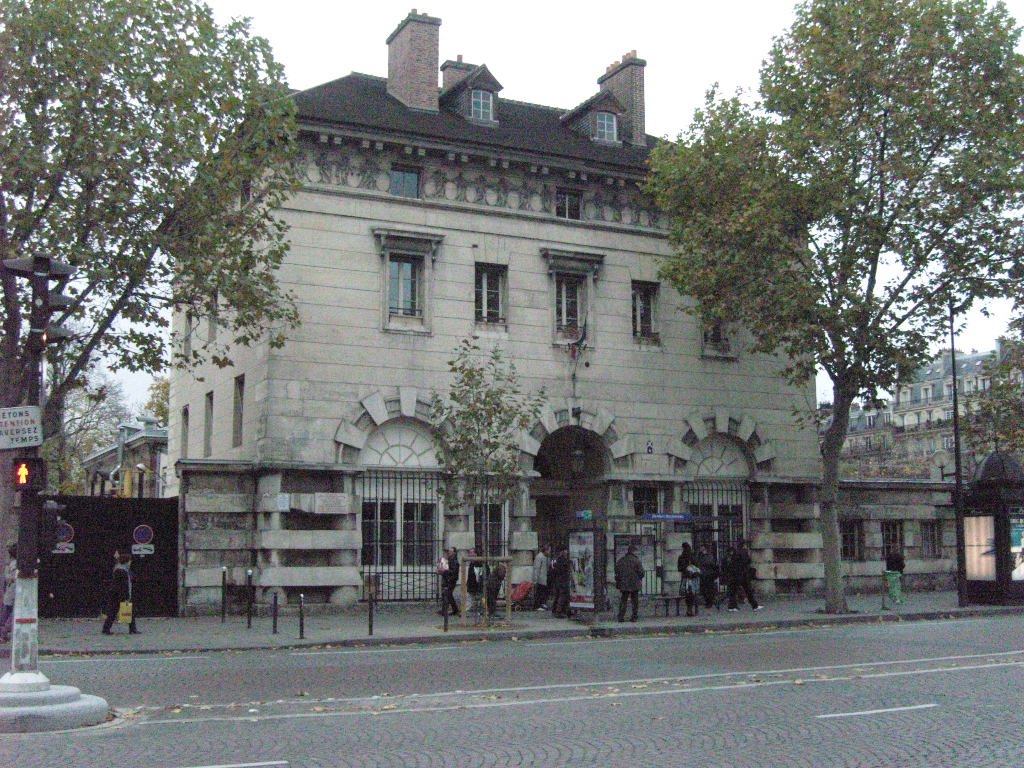
The tax-collection pavilion of the Enfer barrier. The entrance to the catacombs is behind the double-gate on the left.

This square owes its original official recognition to letters patent dated 9 August 1760, which applied to the part of the site that was located inside the old Wall of the Farmers-General (i.e. the northeastern portion of the present Place Denfert-Rochereau). The Wall of the Farmers-General, built under the ancien régime to prevent the evasion of excise taxes, separated Paris from the suburb of Montrouge. An ordinance of the Bureau of Finances, dated 16 January 1789, recognized the southwestern portion of the square, the part outside the wall, as part of Paris. The opening in the wall itself, which permitted entry or exit from Paris, was commonly called the Barrière d’Enfer. It is mentioned in Les Misérables by Victor Hugo:

"How did those children come there? Perhaps they had escaped from some guardhouse which stood ajar; perhaps in the vicinity, at the barrière d'Enfer, or on the esplanade de l'Observatoire, or in the neighboring carrefour, dominated by the pediment on which could be read: invenerunt parvulum pannis involutum ["they discovered the infant wrapped in swaddling clothes"], there was some mountebank's booth from which they had fled […]."

Here, astride the opening in the wall, the architect Claude Nicolas Ledoux constructed two tollhouses to be used for the collection of the octroi, a local tariff levied on products entering Paris. At the center of the present square, these two pavilions once framed the opening in the wall, and now, oddly, the entrance to the underworld of the catacombs lies next to the western one of them, the pavilion at the barrière d'Enfer ("barrier of Hell").

== Former name ==
Traditionally called by the rather unattractive name of Place d'Enfer ('Hell Square'), the square had the name of Denfert-Rochereau ascribed to it through a sort of "municipal pun". The Franco-Prussian War had demoralized the French populace, and there was widespread damage all over northeastern France and to Paris itself. Anxious to put a positive spin on the defeat, the French authorities were looking for heroes to glorify. (At this time, for example, the village of Bitche, located near the German border on the Orne, had a Parisian square named for it because it had put up a spirited defense against the Prussians).

Denfert-Rochereau was a courageous man and an authentic hero, but whether his grandiose nickname, "The Lion of Belfort", was deserved is a matter of some debate. Nonetheless, since "Denfert" (of Denfert-Rochereau) is pronounced exactly the same as "d'Enfer" (of the Place d'Enfer), this coincidence was too perfect for the mairie (city hall) to ignore. They renamed the square the Place Denfert-Rochereau, and they could plausibly deny that they were ignoring Paris's ancient traditions in so doing. The name has remained the Place Denfert-Rochereau ever since.

== Places of interest ==
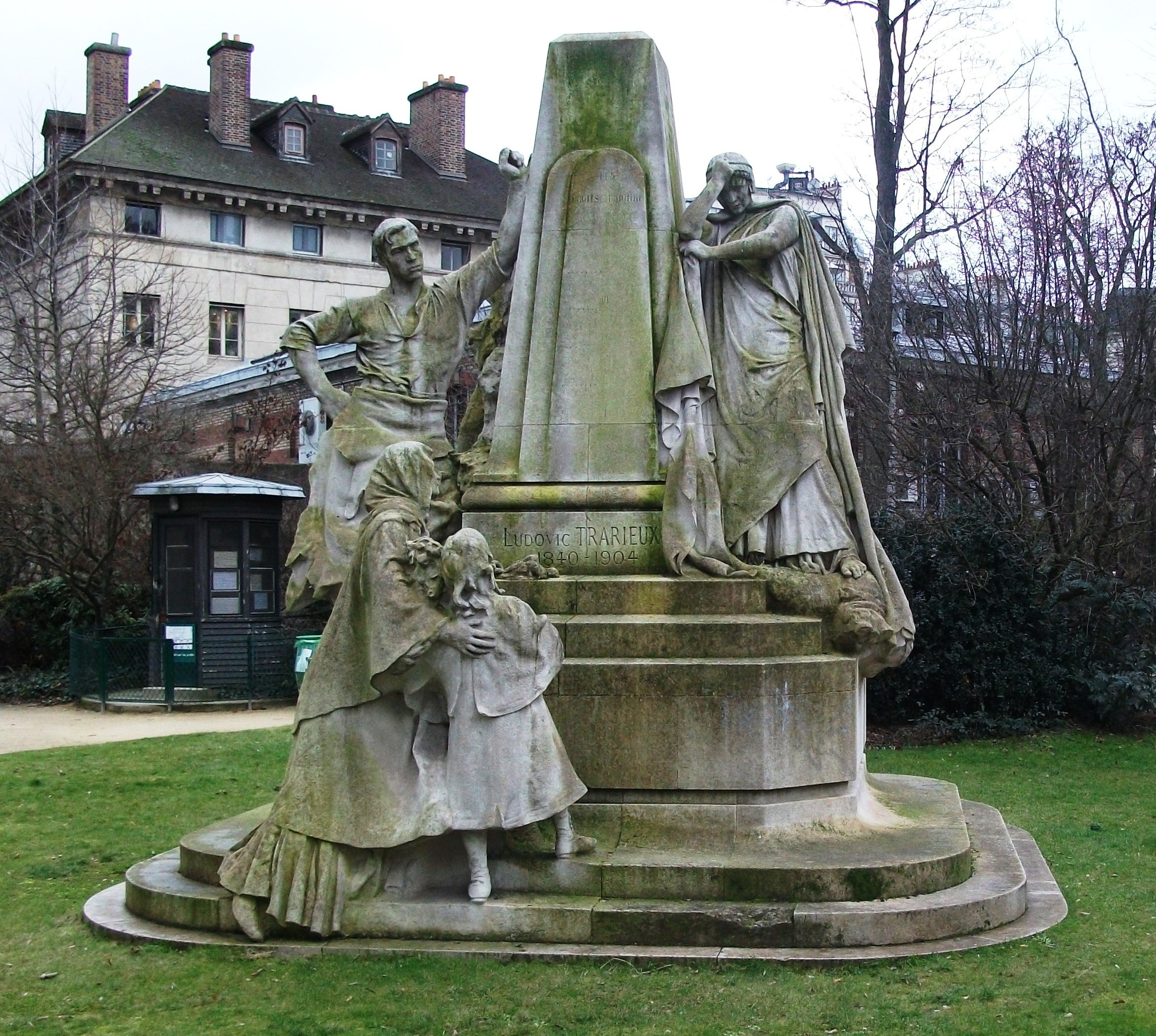
Monument to Ludovic Trarieux by Jean Boucher

The main square, the Place Denfert-Rochereau, is planted with trees, mostly horse chestnuts, maples, and locusts, and there are three named green spaces within it as well: Square Abbé Migne, Square Jacques Antoine, and Square Claude Nicolas Ledoux. At the center of the square, in the midst of the traffic circulation, is a one-third-scale replica of the Lion of Belfort statue by Bartholdi, symbolizing the courage of the resistance raised by Colonel Denfert-Rochereau at Belfort. In the garden to one side is a monument by Jean Boucher commemorating Ludovic Trarieux.

The section of the main north–south boulevard running through the centre of the square is named for French Resistance leader Henri Rol-Tanguy. It is just one block in length, and connects the Avenue Denfert-Rochereau in the north to the Avenue General Leclerc in the south. The entrance to the Paris Catacombs is now located within the recently renovated building with handsome romanesque arches across its facade, on the odd-numbered side of Avenue du Colonel-Henri-Rol-Tanguy. This entrance is directly across the street from an identical even-numbered building that used to house the Directorate of Roads and Transport (Direction de la Voirie et des Déplacements), but since October 2019 is now the Musée de la Libération and Musée Jean Moulin. These two buildings, classified as historical monuments, are the pavilions of the old Barrière d'Enfer, where taxes were collected on goods entering Paris. They are built to the design of the 19th-century architect, Claude Nicolas Ledoux, whose work can be found all over the city. This part of the square has enveloped the site of the Barrière d'Enfer, as well as part of the boulevards d'Enfer and Saint-Jacques, and a part of the boulevards Montrouge and Arcueil, roads which, at one time, led to those two southern suburbs but no longer exist.

== Metro station ==
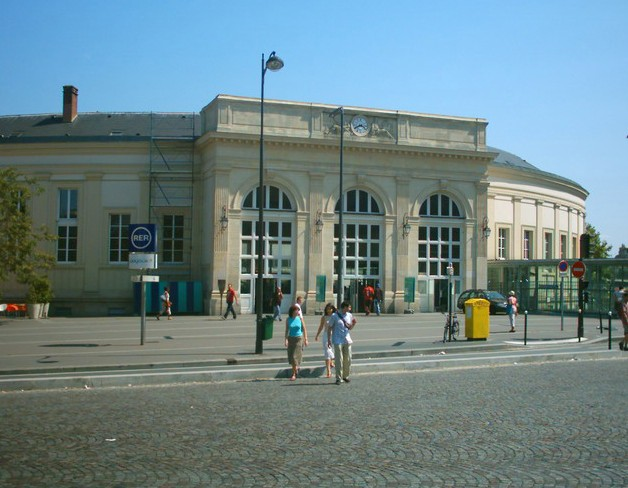
Denfert-Rochereau railway station

The Place Denfert-Rochereau is served by lines 4 and 6 of the Paris Metro, from Denfert-Rochereau station.

It is also served by the RER Line B commuter train from the old railway station of the Sceaux line, the entrance to which is to the east of the square.
