= David Castello-Lopes =

French videographer (born 1981)

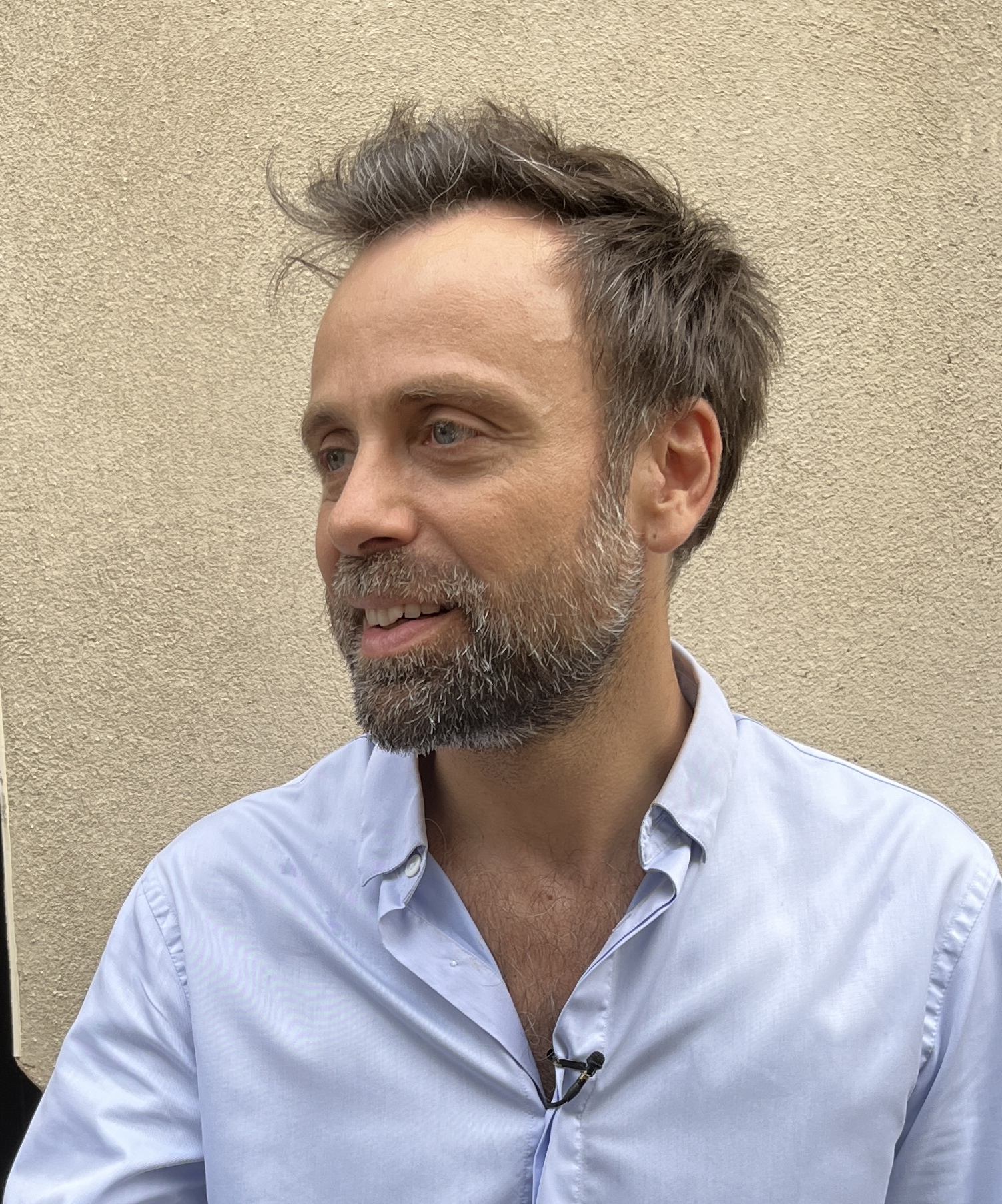
- Castello-Lopes in 2023
- Born: David Heimer de Castello Lopes; 16 September 1981 (age 44); Paris, France

YouTube information
- Channel: David Castello-Lopes
- Years active: 2010–present
- Subscribers: 188,000
- Views: 15.6 million
- Last updated: 6 January 2026
- Website: davidcastellolopes.com

David Castello-Lopes (born 16 September 1981) is a French-Portuguese journalist, comedian, and videographer.

== Early life ==
David Castello-Lopes was born on 16 September 1981 in the 12th arrondissement of Paris, France. He is the son of Gérard Castello-Lopes and Danièle Heimer.

== Career ==
He did participate in written media such as Le Monde or Le Gorafi, then in radio with Europe 1 or France Inter and worked in public TV like Arte or Canal+.

Castello-Lopes is known for making video series, including Depuis quand (French for "Since when") and Suisse? (French for "Swiss?").
