= Church of the Immaculate Conception, Paris =

Church in Paris, France

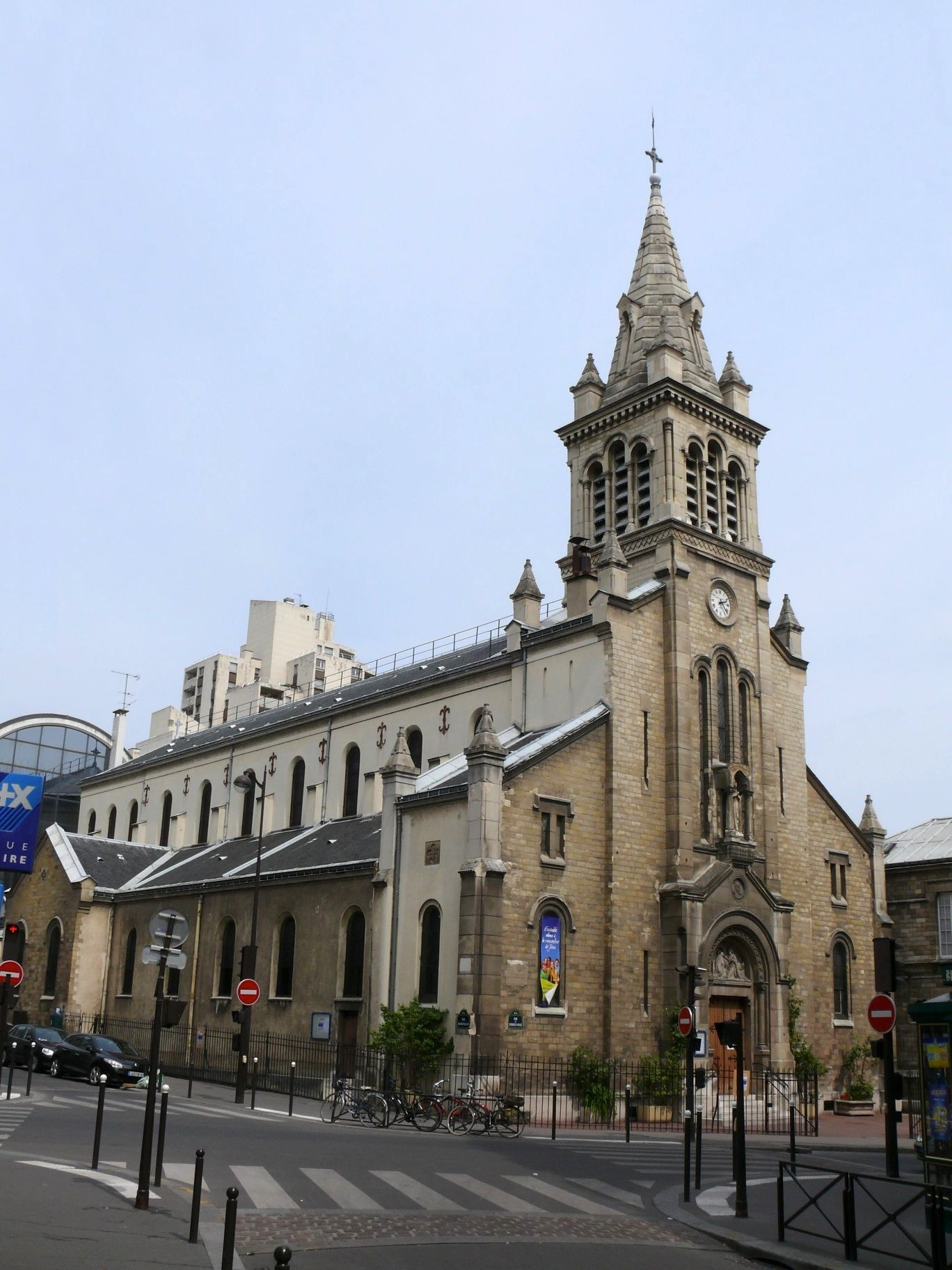

Religion
- Affiliation: Roman Catholic
- Province: Paris
- Region: Ile de France

Location
- Country: France
- Interactive map of Church of the Immaculate Conception, Paris
- Coordinates: 48.845889°N 2.40333°E

Architecture
- Architect: Edouard Delebarre-Debay
- Style: Neo Roman

The Church of the Immacuate Conception (French: L'église de l'Immaculée-Conception de Paris) is Catholic church located in the 12th arrondissement of Paris, at No. 34 Rue du Rendez-Vous at the corner of Rue Marsoulan. As with the vast majority of Catholic Churches in Paris, it follows the Latin Rite and is subject to the Archdiocese of Paris.

== Architecture ==
The plans for the church were made by Édouard Delebarre de Bay.

== Works of art ==
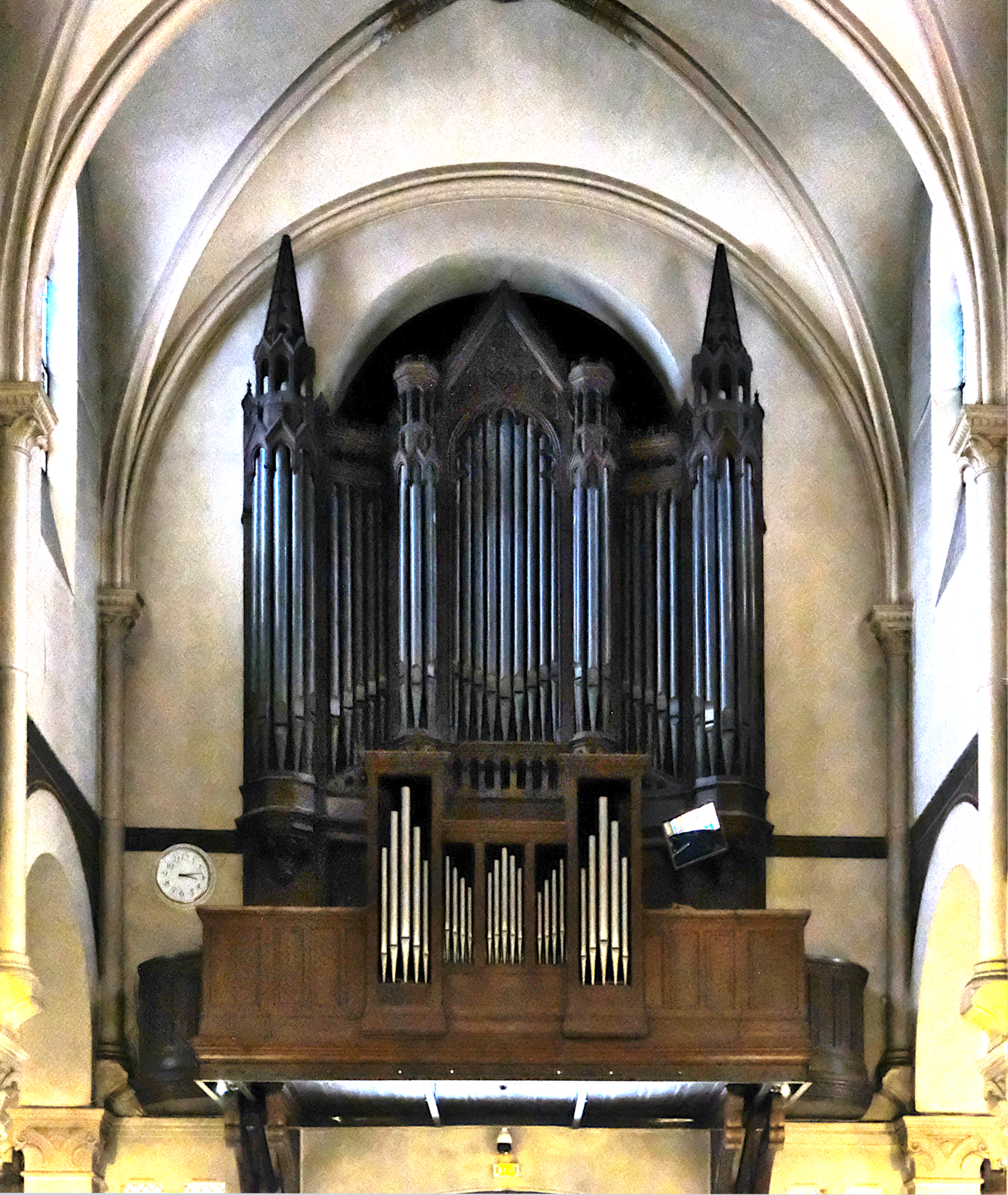
Orgue de tribune.

The paintings of the choir are by Victor Zier, a painter originally from Poland, active in France at the end of the 19th century.

== See also ==
- List of churches in Paris
