= Faubourg Saint-Antoine =

- Faubourg
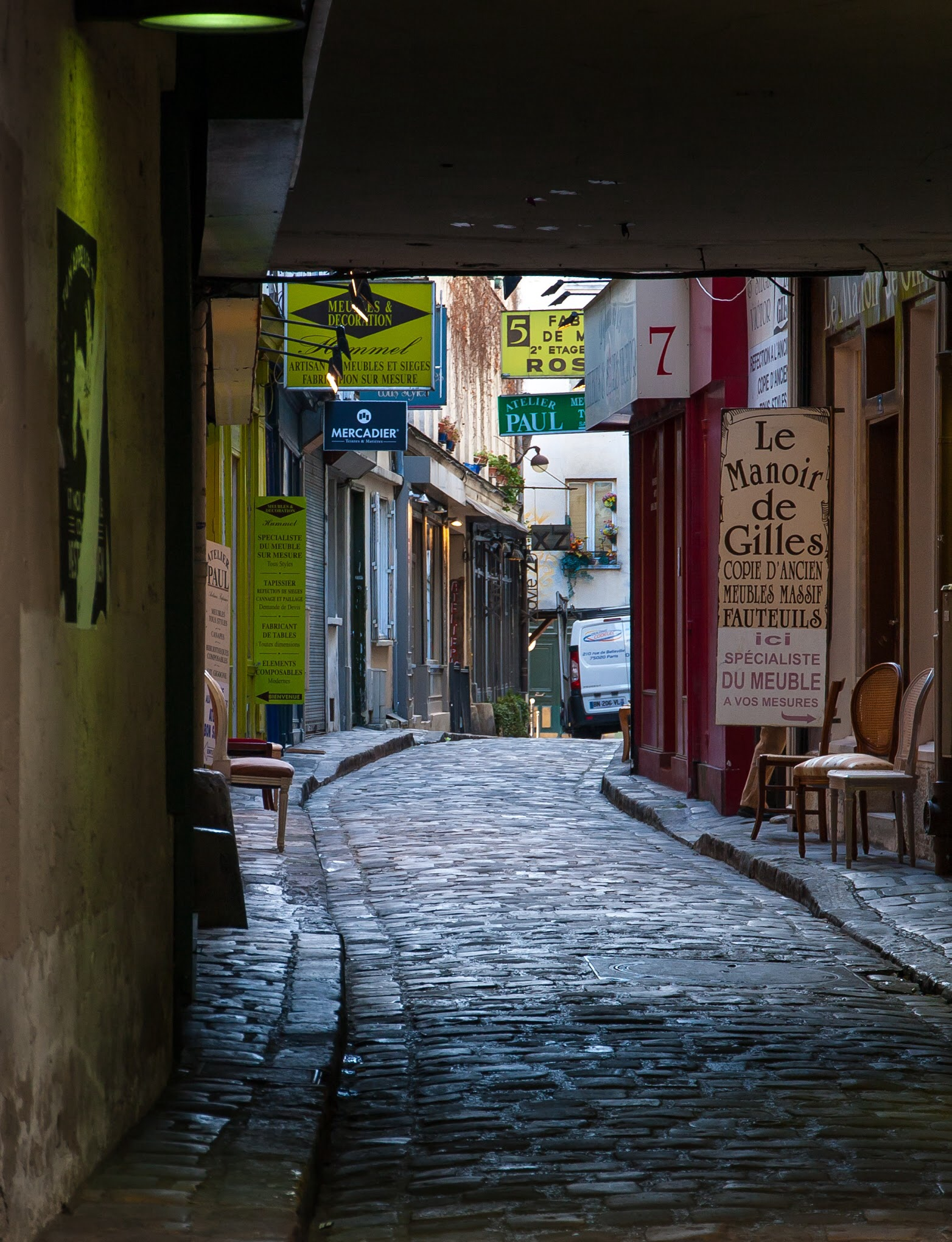
- Passage du Chantier

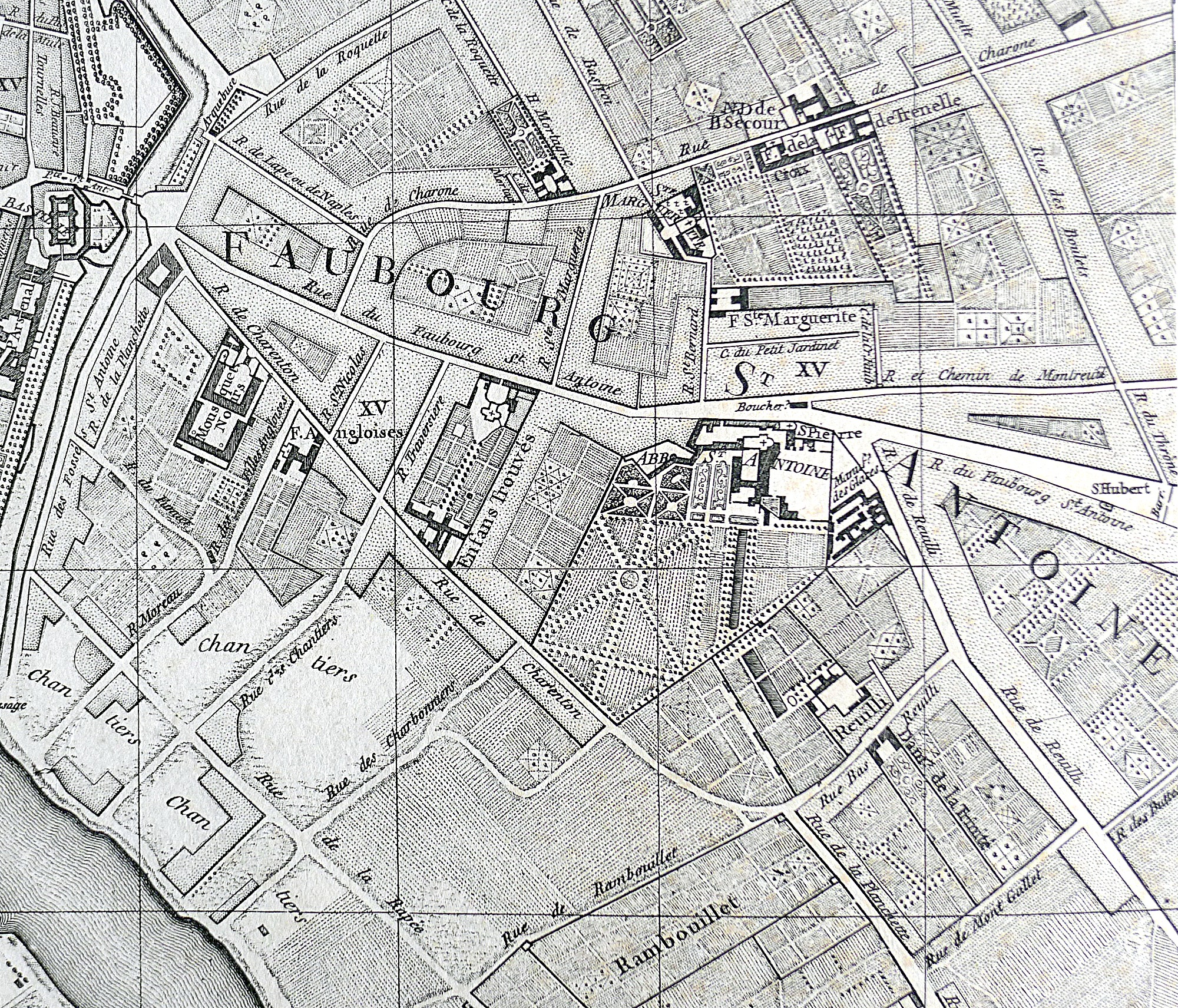
- Vaugondy's map of Paris (Faubourg Saint-Antoine) - 1760

- Location in Paris
- Coordinates: 48.8505°N 2.3792°E
- Country: France
- City: Paris
- Arrondissement: 12th

The Faubourg Saint-Antoine (French pronunciation: [fobuʁ sɛ̃t‿ɑ̃twan]) was one of the traditional suburbs of Paris, France. It grew up to the east of the Bastille around the abbey of Saint-Antoine-des-Champs, and ran along the Rue du Faubourg Saint-Antoine.

== Location ==
The Faubourg Saint-Antoine extended from the Porte Saint-Antoine towards the abbey of Saint-Antoine-des-Champs, then to the Château de Vincennes. Roads led to the villages of Charenton, Charonne, Reuilly and Montreuil, which provided large amounts of wine, fruit and vegetables to the city. Today the former faubourg is divided by the rue du Faubourg Saint-Antoine between the 11th arrondissement of Paris, which extends to the north of the road, and 12th arrondissement, which extends to the south.

== History ==
=== Early years ===
The suburb was the location of the Battle of the Faubourg St Antoine on 2 July 1652.

In the 17th century, according to Piganiol de La Force, "The Faubourg Saint-Antoine increased prodigiously from the large number of houses that were built there, both because of the good air and because of the king's letters patent of 1657, which exempted from the qualification of mastership all artisans and tradespeople who lived there." Firewood and construction timber from higher up the Seine was unloaded at the nearby Quai de la Rapée on the Île Louviers and stored in the faubourg, leading to development of woodworking crafts.

Skilled Flemish and German artisans, often Protestant, moved to the faubourg and worked as carvers, gilders, polishers, turners and cabinetmakers. Jean-Baptiste Colbert established the royal mirror factory on the rue de Reuilly. The factory of Jean-Baptiste Réveillon on the rue de Montreuil on part of the site of the former Folie Titon became the royal wallpaper factory under Louis XVI. In April 1789 the contractor running the Réveillon factory sparked a riot by threatening to cut wages. The factory was badly damaged, troops were brought in and several dozen people were killed.

=== French Revolution ===
During the French Revolution (1789–99) the faubourg was given the name "Faubourg-de-Gloire". The faubourg gained a reputation for turbulence during the revolution, starting with the storming of the Bastille on 14 July 1789. The people of the Quinze-Vingts and Montreuil sections took part in the insurrection of 10 August 1792, and that of 2 June 1793 that caused to Girondins to fall from power. The revolt of 1 Prairial Year III began in the faubourg, and was savagely repressed.

=== 19th century ===
In 1808 there were 750 workers, mostly children, in the rue de Charonne spinning mills of François Richard-Lenoir (1765–1839) and Joseph Lenoir-Dufresne (1768–1806), housed in a former convent. The machines were horse-powered. In the uprising of June 1848 the Faubourg Saint-Antoine was the last to capitulate, after being heavily shelled by artillery from the Bastille area and then attacked by troops from the Popincourt quarter, with many casualties, in the morning of June 26, 1848.

The Faubourg Saint-Antoine, controlled by the Reuilly barracks, was densely populated with people of the working and "dangerous" classes. Baron Georges-Eugène Haussmann wanted to ensure that an insurrection could easily be suppressed. He proposed to Napoleon III to lower the level of the Canal Saint-Martin and cover it so it could be crossed by the Boulevard de la Reine-Hortense (now the Boulevard Richard-Lenoir). He said, "I have rarely seen my august sovereign enthusiastic. This time he was so without reserve, so great an importance did he place ... on the work by means of which I proposed to remove the permanent obstacle ... to the line of control from which one could, in case of need, take the Faubourg Saint-Antoine from the rear."

Haussmann split the faubourg between the 11th and 12th arrondissements and replaced the street names with numbers, but the inhabitants continued to use the old names. The former faubourg retained its revolutionary character after it had been formally dissolved. According to Daniel Halévy,

As long as the Dreyfus crisis lasted the Fauberg Saint-Antoine was our fortress ... in the little room on Rue Paul-Bert, where we huddled together, workers and bourgeois, where we squeezed our chairs one against the other ... One day in autumn 1899, we watched for hours the return of the crown of workers who had been parading on the Place du Trône, before the Triomphe de la République, Dalou's bronze statue that had been unveiled that day. I doubt that 1848, with its famous festivals, or 1790, on the day of the Federations, saw a greater movement of the masses, or one so powerfully possessed by the spirit of the Revolution".

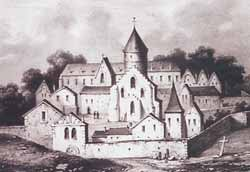
Abbey of Saint-Antoine-des-Champs

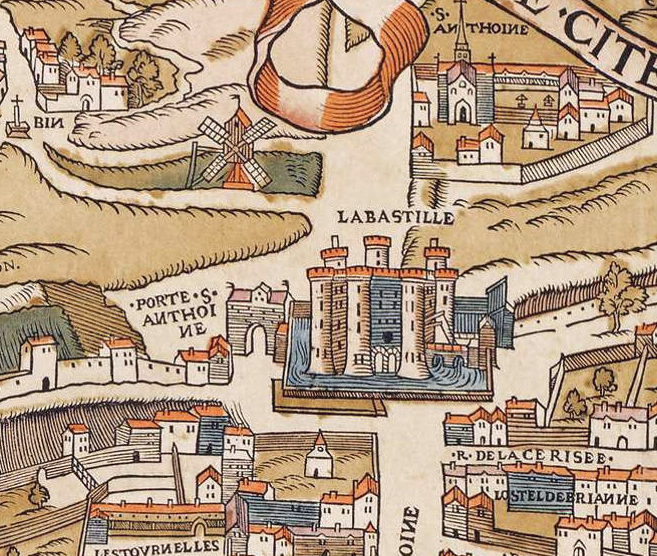
Porte St-Antoine c. 1550

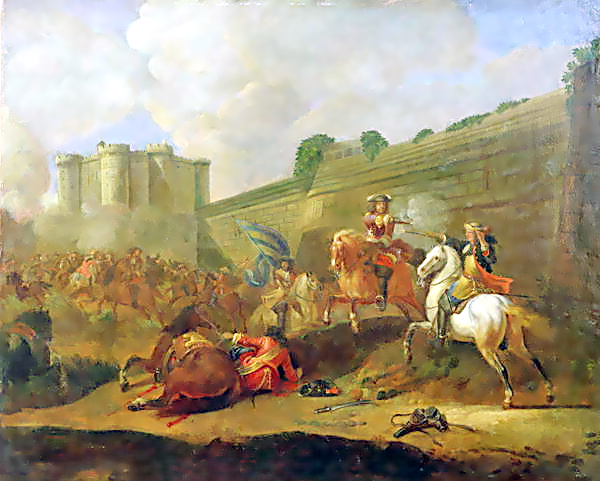
Battle of the Faubourg St Antoine by the Walls of the Bastille in 1652

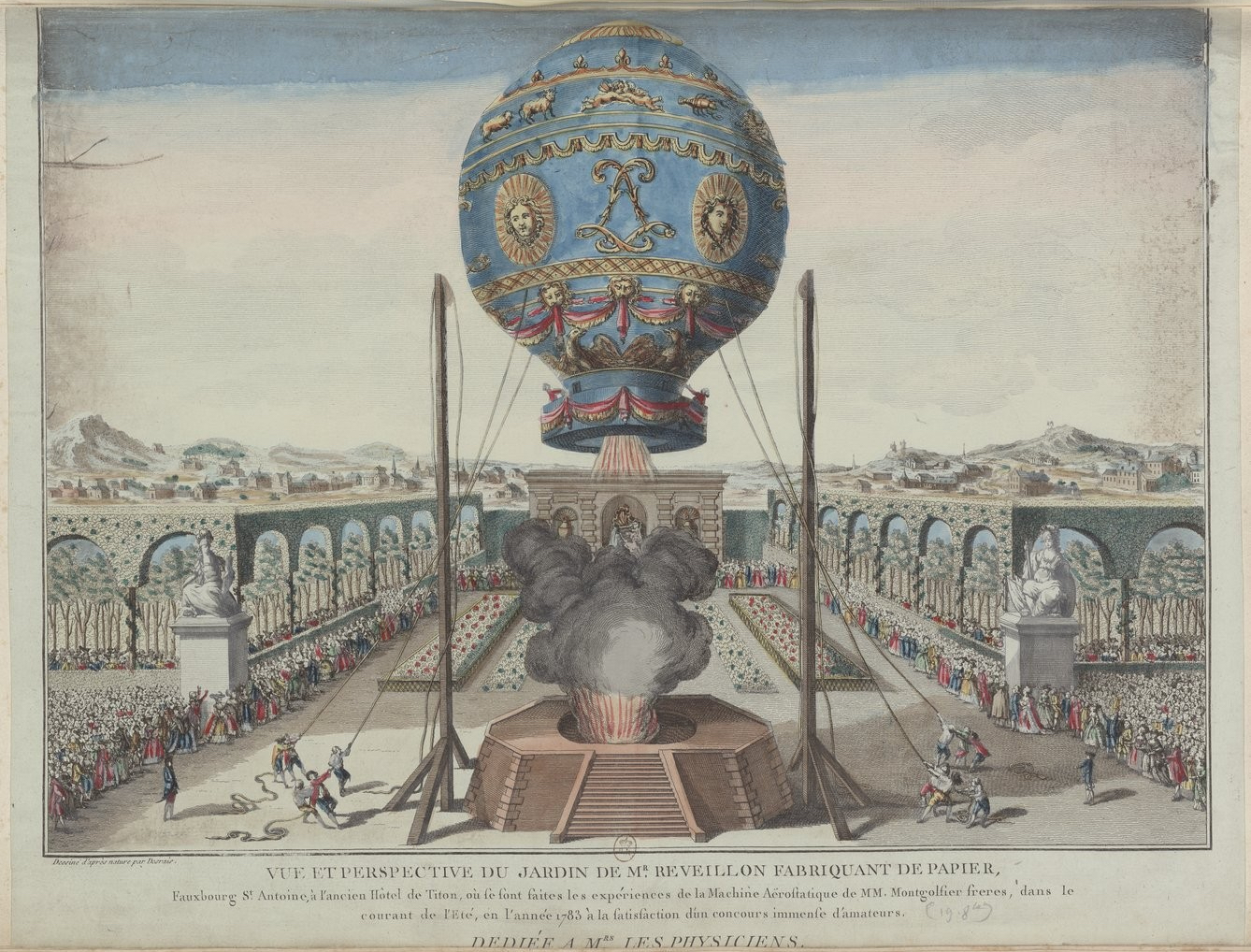
Tethered balloon rises from the papeterie Réveillon (19 October 1783)

== In popular culture ==
Large parts of the book A Tale of Two Cities (1859) take place in Faubourg Saint-Antoine, where it is referred to as simply 'Saint Antoine'. The Faubourg Saint-Antoine is also the setting for many scenes in Les Misérables (1862).

== Sources ==
- Figuères, Roger de (1901), Les noms révolutionnaires des communes de France; listes par départements et liste générale alphabétique (in French), Paris: Société de l'histoire de la révolution française
- Hazan, Eric (2011-05-23), The Invention of Paris: A History in Footsteps, Verso Books, ISBN 978-1-84467-800-6
