= Jardin du port de l'Arsenal =

Park in Paris

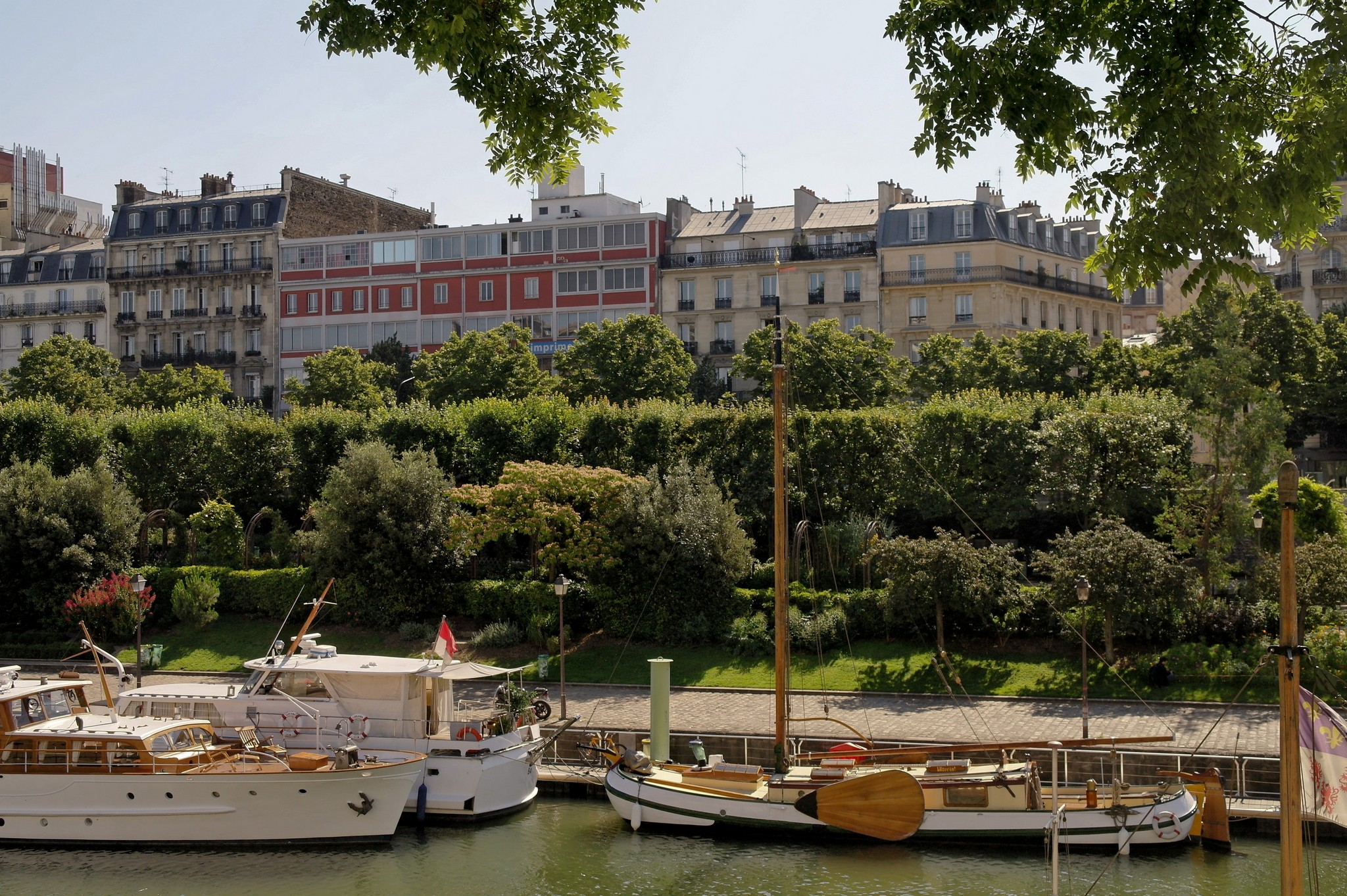
- Jardin du Bassin de l'Arsenal
- Interactive map of Jardin du port de l'Arsenal
- Type: Urban garden
- Location: 12th arrondissement, Paris
- Coordinates: 48°50′57″N 2°22′04″E
- Area: 1.4 hectares (3.5 acres)
- Created: 1983
- Status: Open all year
- Public transit: Located near the Bastille and Quai de la Rapée metro stations

The Jardin du Bassin de l'Arsenal is a public park in the 12th arrondissement of Paris, located on the east bank of the Canal Saint-Martin between the Place de la Bastille and the Seine. It was created in 1983. The access to the park is from boulevard de la Bastille. The nearest metro station is Bastille.

== History ==
The Arsenal was established by Napoleon Bonaparte in 1806, between the Place de la Bastille and the Seine. The Canal Saint-Martin was not finished until 1825. It was 4,5 kilometers long, and linked the Seine with the basin of La Vilette. In the 1970s a proposal was put forward by the Paris municipal council to cover the canal completely with a four-lane highway. The project was rejected after public protests.

The section of canal between Place de la Bastille and the Seine became instead a harbor for private yachts and excursion boats. In 1983 the city decided to develop the edge of the canal into a garden a promenade. The designers of the park were architect Philippe Mathieux and landscape architect Serge Eyzat.

== Features of the park ==
The park is 544 meters long, and occupies 1.4 hectares along the east bank of the canal between the river and the Place de la Bastille. The main features of the park are an alley sheltered by maple and willow trees, and a pergola covered with roses and other plants. The park also has several works of sculpture from the period of the 1920s and 1930s taken from the city's reserves, including a bronze statue of the Diane by Henry Arnold (1879–1945). The park also has a restaurant whose architecture is inspired by garden greenhouses.

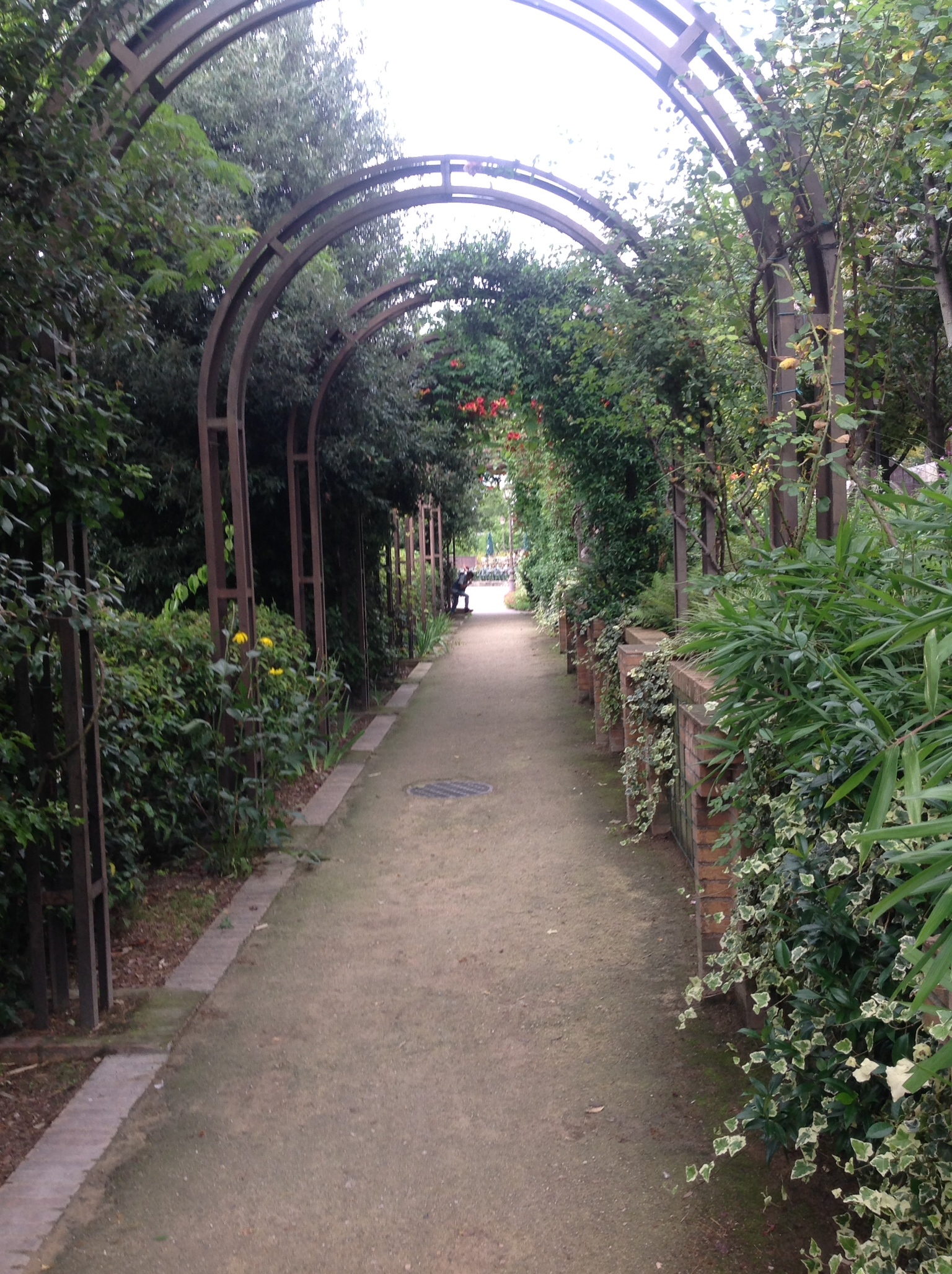
Pergola in the Jardin du Bassin de l'Arsenal

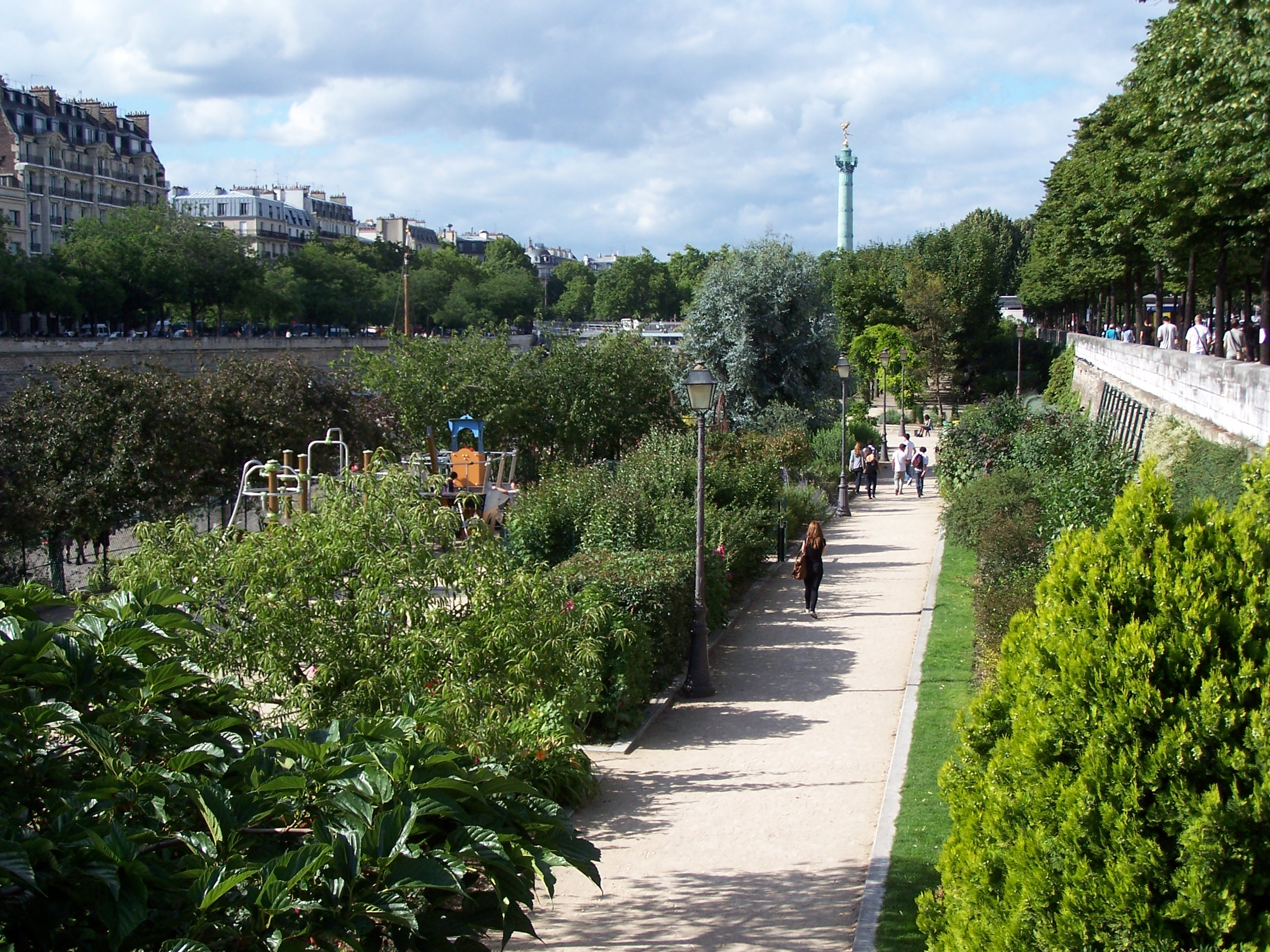
Pathway in the Jardin du Bassin de l'Arsenal

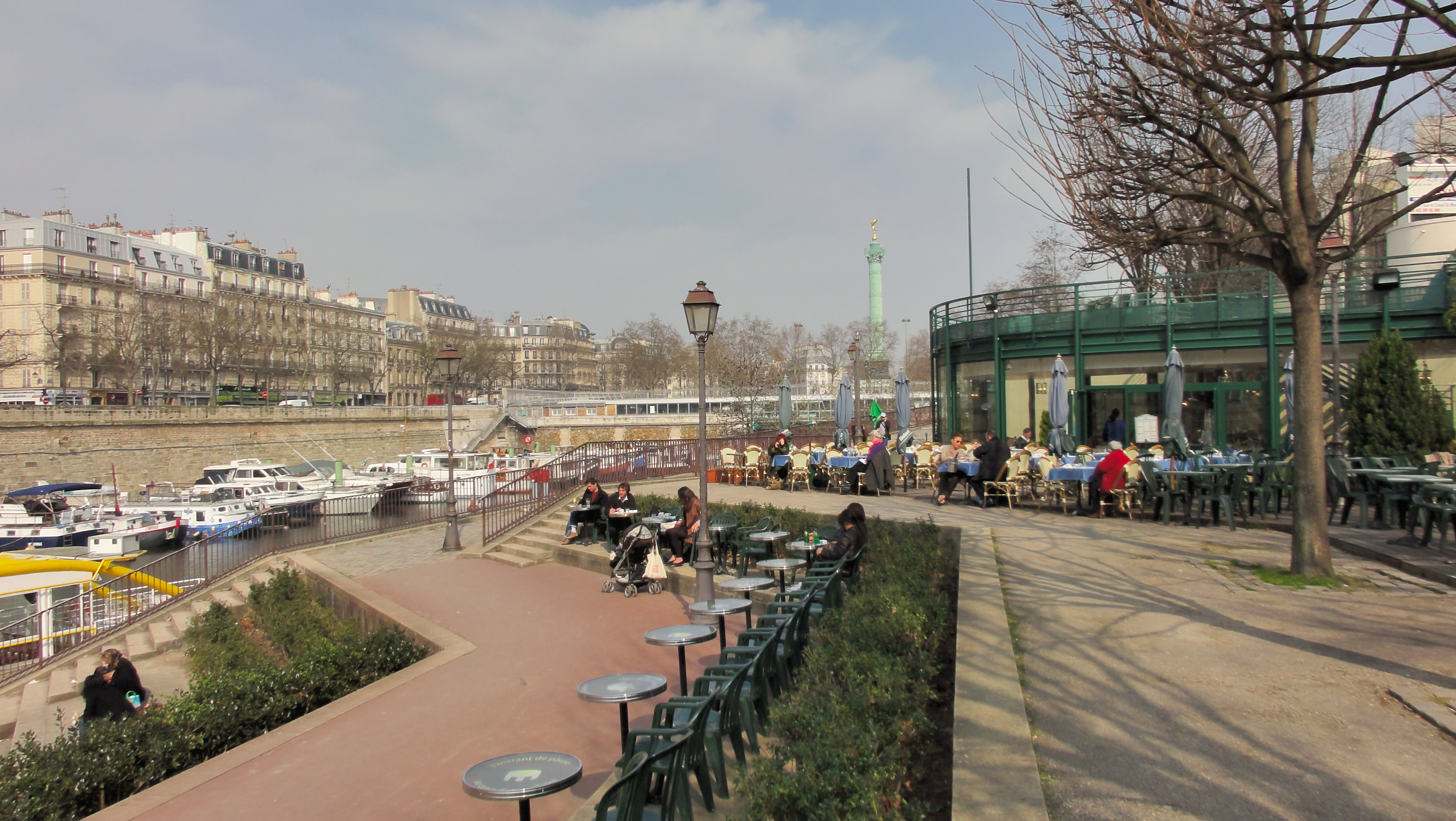
The terrace in spring.

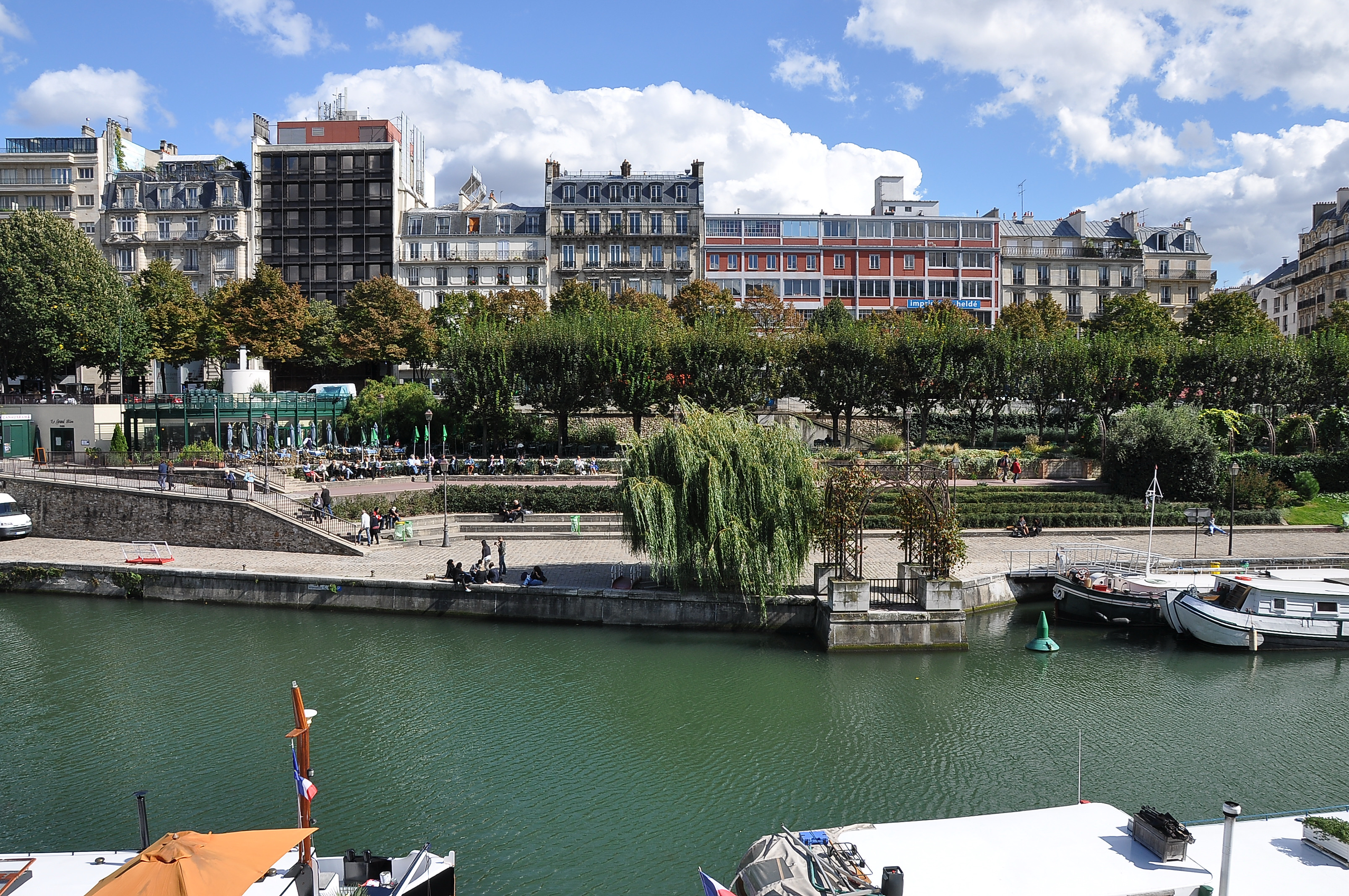
View from boulevard Bourdon.

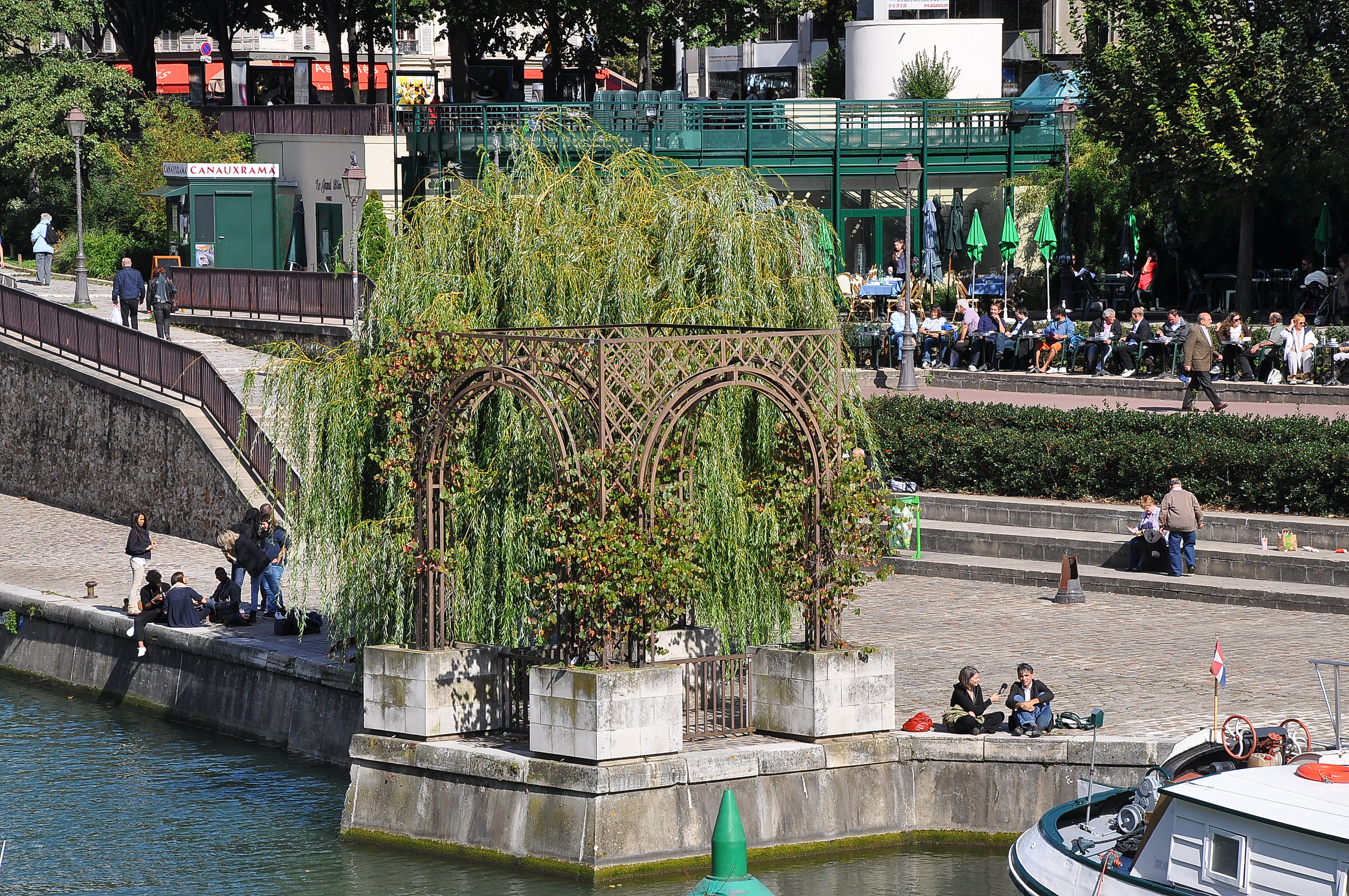
At the edge of the pool.

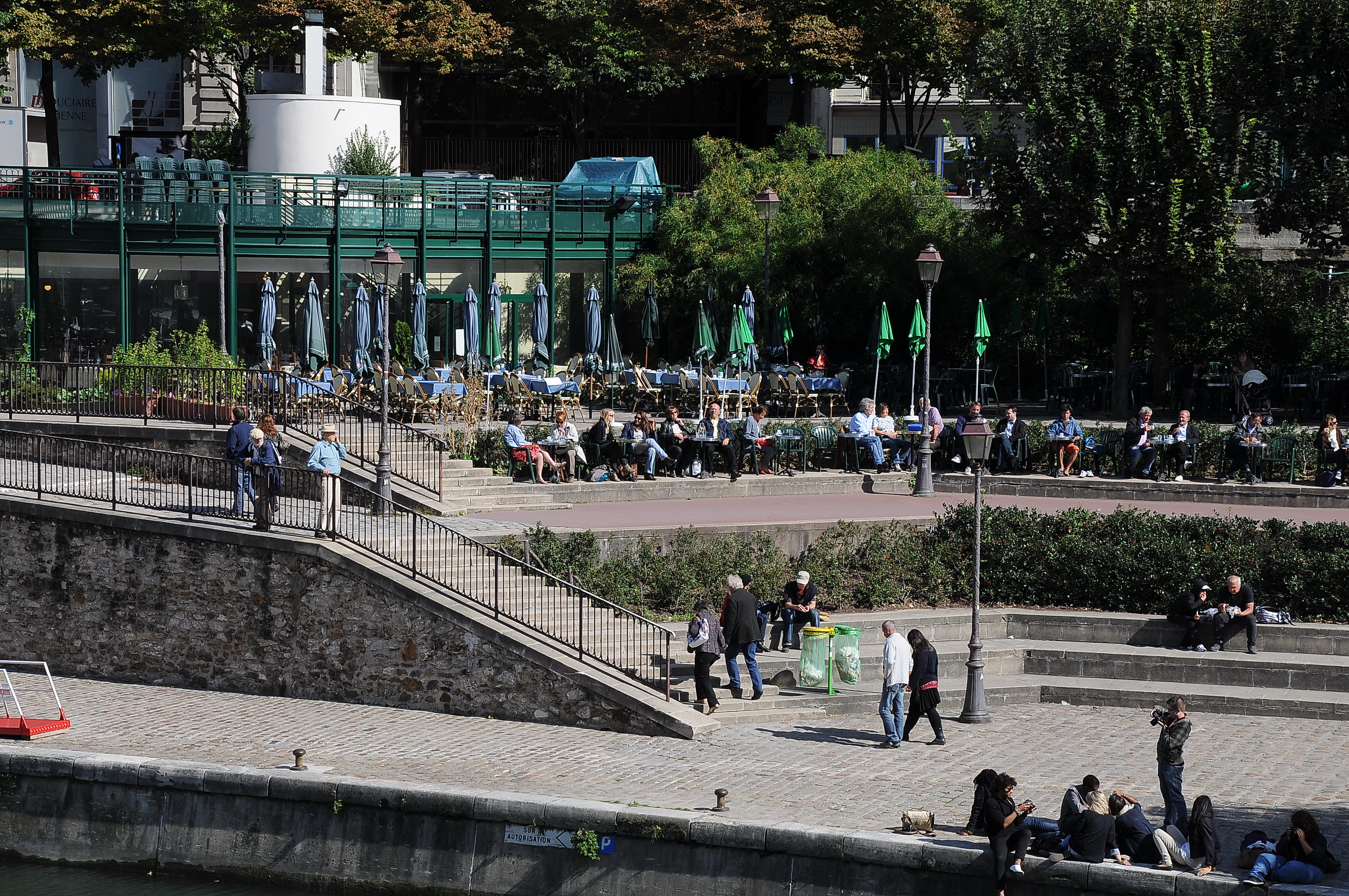
The coffee terrace.

== See also ==
- 12th arrondissement of Paris
- History of Parks and Gardens of Paris
- List of parks and gardens in Paris
