= Saint-Antoine-des-Champs =

Abbey in Paris, France

Coordinates: 48°50′56″N 2°22′57″E

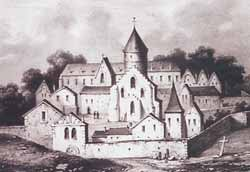
Saint-Antoine-des-Champs Abbey.

The Abbey of Saint-Antoine-des-Champs (French pronunciation: [sɛ̃t‿ɑ̃twan de ʃɑ̃]) was a monastery in what is now the 12th arrondissement of Paris. The Faubourg Saint-Antoine developed around it. It later became the Hôpital Saint-Antoine.
