= 12th arrondissement of Paris =

- Municipal arrondissement
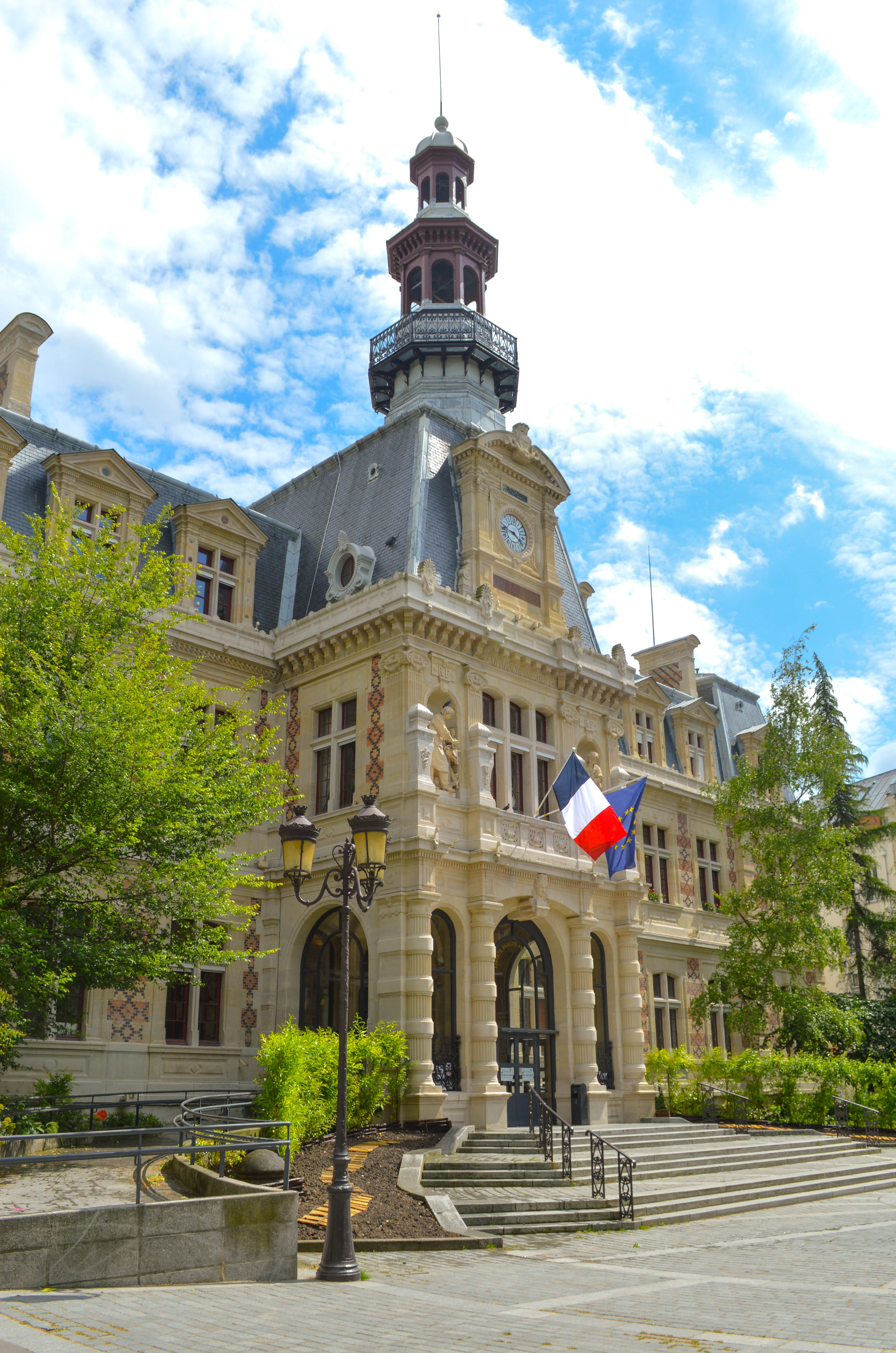
- Mairie du XII^{e} arrondissement

- Coat of arms

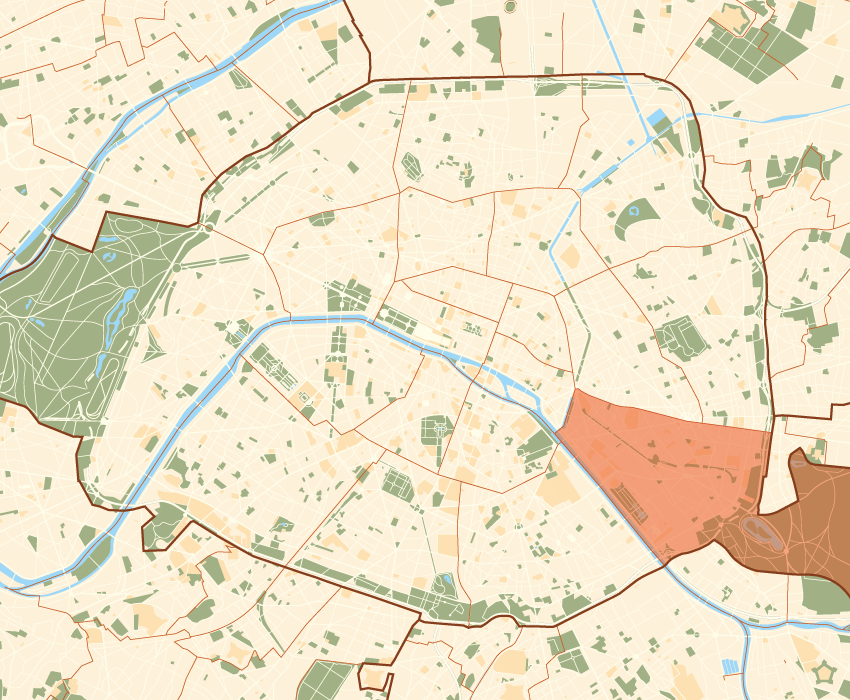
- Location within Paris
- Coordinates: 48°50′27″N 2°23′17″E
- Country: France
- Region: Île-de-France
- Department: Paris
- Commune: Paris

Government
  - Mayor (2020–2026): Emmanuelle Pierre-Marie (EELV)
- Area: 16.32 km^{2} (6.30 sq mi)
- Population (2023): 138,024
  - Density: 8,457/km^{2} (21,900/sq mi)
- INSEE code: 75112

The 12th arrondissement of Paris (XII^{e} arrondissement) is one of the 20 arrondissements of the capital city of France. Situated on the right bank of the River Seine, it is the easternmost arrondissement of Paris, as well as the largest by area. In 2023, it had a population of 138,024.

The 12th arrondissement comprises the Gare de Lyon and Bois de Vincennes. It borders the inner suburbs of Charenton-le-Pont and Saint-Mandé in Val-de-Marne.

== History ==
It is in the 12th arrondissement that some of the oldest traces of human occupation of the territory now occupied by Paris were found. During the construction of Bercy Village in the 1980s, vestiges of a Neolithic village were discovered (dating from between 4500 and 3800 BC). Subsequent excavations turned up wooden canoes (the pirogues de Bercy), bows and arrows, pottery and bone and stone tools. Some of these objects are now exhibited in the Carnavalet Museum.

During the Roman era, the area that is now the 12th arrondissement was a largely uninhabited wetland fed by streams originating in the surrounding hills. The area was crossed by a Roman road that linked Paris to Chelles and Meaux to the east and to Melun to the southeast.

=== The Bois and the Château of Vincennes ===
In the 11th century, the forest that would later become the bois de Vincennes was considered to be non-arable land. When Hugues Capet, King of the Franks, took up residence on the Île de la Cité, he used the bois de Vincennes as his hunting ground. The bois was then reserved for the exclusive use of the kings of France. Under Philippe Auguste it was enclosed by a 12 km wall.^{:6}

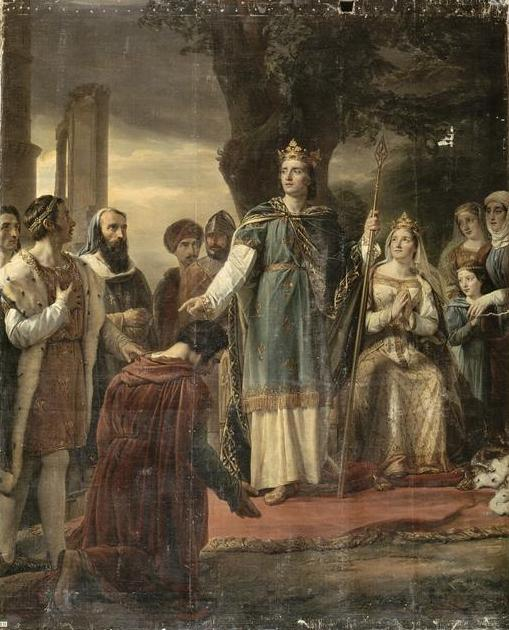
Saint Louis, administering justice under the oak of Vincennes

A hunting lodge was built by Louis VII around 1150, which was upgraded to a Manor House by Philippe Auguste, who made it a royal residence that was used over the 1150–1340 period. Legend has it that Louis IX, Saint Louis, administered justice under an oak tree in what is now the bois de Vincennes.

The long process of turning this residence into a fortified castle, the Château de Vincennes, began in about 1337, when Philippe VI de Valois decided to build a dungeon near the Manor House. Progressive upgrades by subsequent kings led to the construction of the fortifications, the Saint Chapelle de Vincennes and several residences within the fortified walls that were designed to cater to royal tastes and standards of living. The last king to use the Château extensively as a royal residence was Louis XIV, who later abandoned it in favour of the Château de Versailles.

=== Emergence of a community of artisans ===
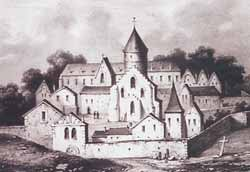
The Saint Anthony of the Fields Abbey (Saint-Antoine-des-Champs)

In 1198, Foulques de Neuilly, preacher of the 4th crusade, built a small hermitage for reformed prostitutes in the marshes of what was to become the 12th arrondissement. In 1204, a Cistercian abbey, Saint Anthony of the Fields, was founded outside and to the east of the walls of Paris. The Abbaye was protected by fortified walls and a moat.^{:14}. Its church was dedicated to Saint Antoine, which gave the name, Faubourg Saint Antoine (Saint Anthony's suburb), to the neighbourhood that grew up around the Abbey.

The Abbey housed nuns (moniales) and, quite quickly, became an institution dominated by noble women with direct connections to both the royal house and other major noble families. The Abbesse was referred to as the Dame du Faubourg. Over several centuries, the Abbey benefited from the fact that these women were well integrated into the reigning economic and political power structures of Paris.

The Faubourg developed a specialty in furniture making and, especially, in cabinet making. The development was due mainly to the protection and favours accorded by the kings of France to the Abbey and its dependents, including a dispensation from taxes for artisans working in the territory of the Abbey. Moreover, in 1471, Louis XI authorised these artisans to work freely, without being subject to the control of the guilds.^{:12} Over the years, the artisans of the Faubourg developed a solid international reputation that attracted skilled craftsmen from all over Europe.^{:275} Since many of these artisans were Protestants, many were killed in August 1572 during the Saint Bartholomew's Day massacre.^{:14}

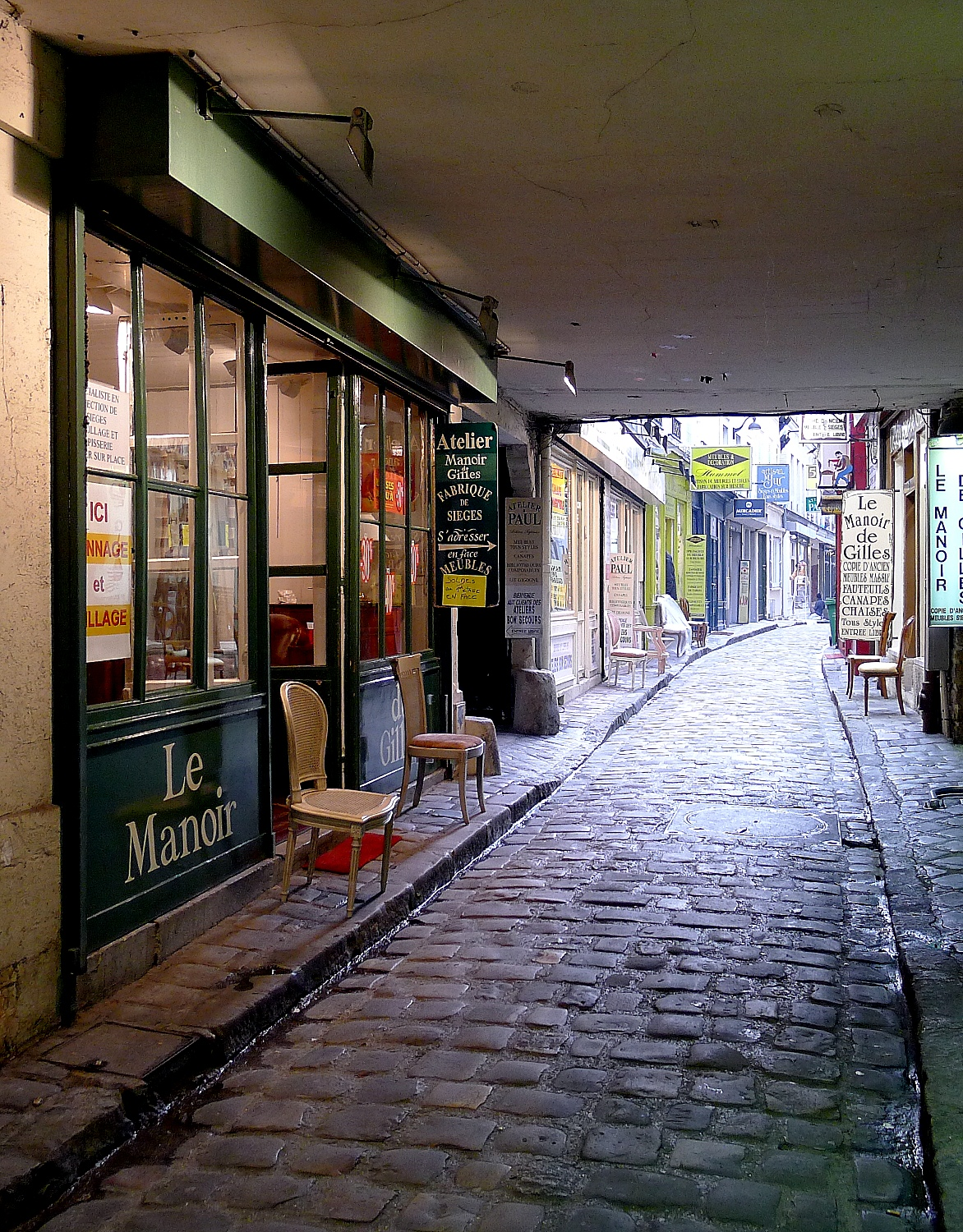
Passage du Chantier, traditional place for commerce, workshops and housing for artisans

Starting in the 17th century, the Royal Mirror Manufacture was established in the Faubourg and further consolidated its reputation. This institution would later become the multinational enterprise, Saint Gobain.

The distinctive courtyards and narrow passageways that characterise the Faubourg served groups of craftsmen who lived and worked together in the same building. This social organisation of production gradually faded out and had disappeared entirely by the final decades of the 20th century.^{:277} With the urban redevelopment of the 1980s, the plan was to use the repurposed arches under the railway viaduc of the defunct Paris-Vincennes line to house artisans' workshops. The resulting Viaduc des Arts provides workshops for a wide array of specialised crafts. Nevertheless, most traces of the furniture-making activity in the Faubourg have disappeared, though the École Boule, a famous school for furniture design founded in 1886^{:51} and located in the 12th arrondissement, continues to bear witness to this ancient artisanal tradition.

=== The country estates of the nobility ===
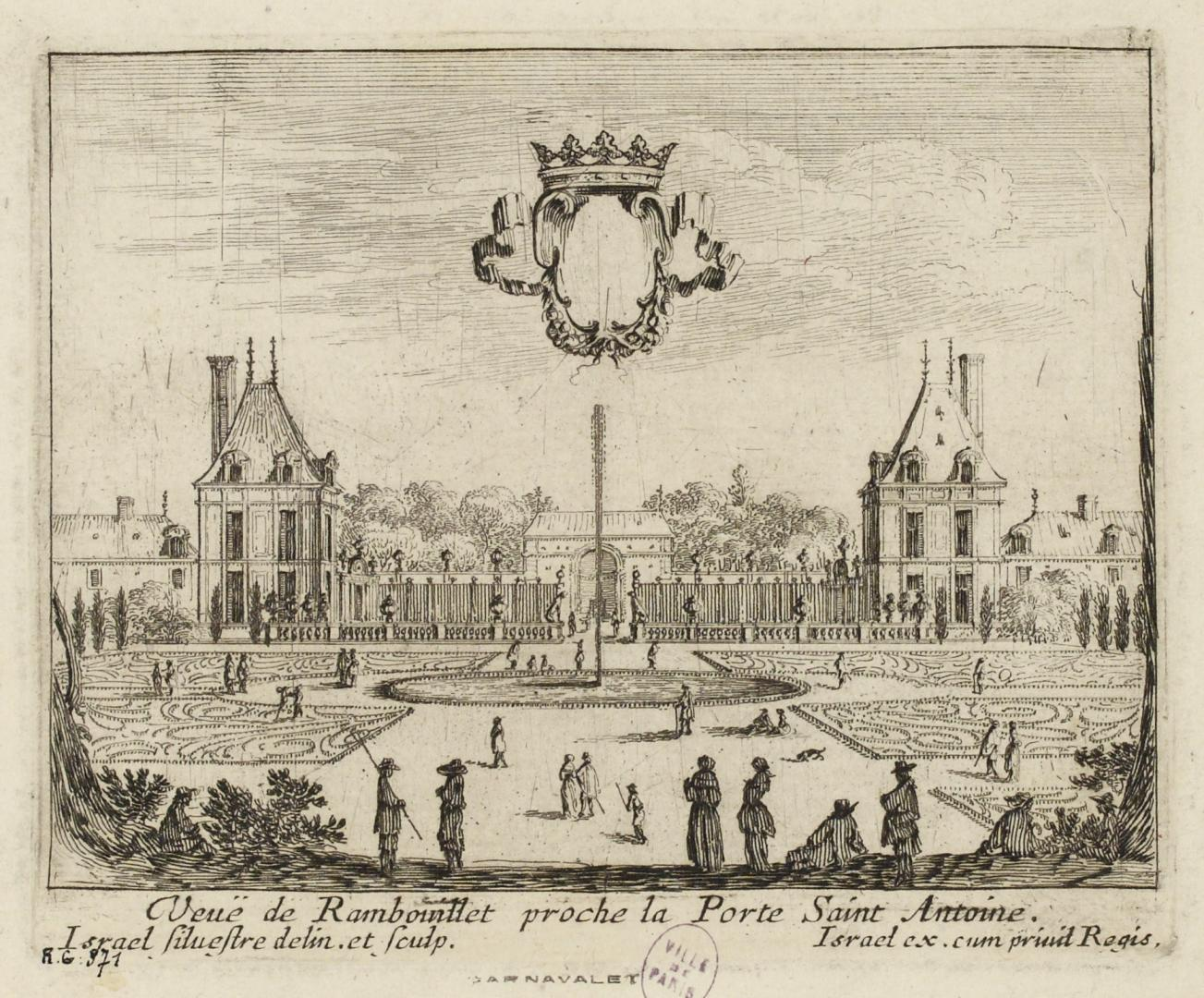
La Folie Rambouillet

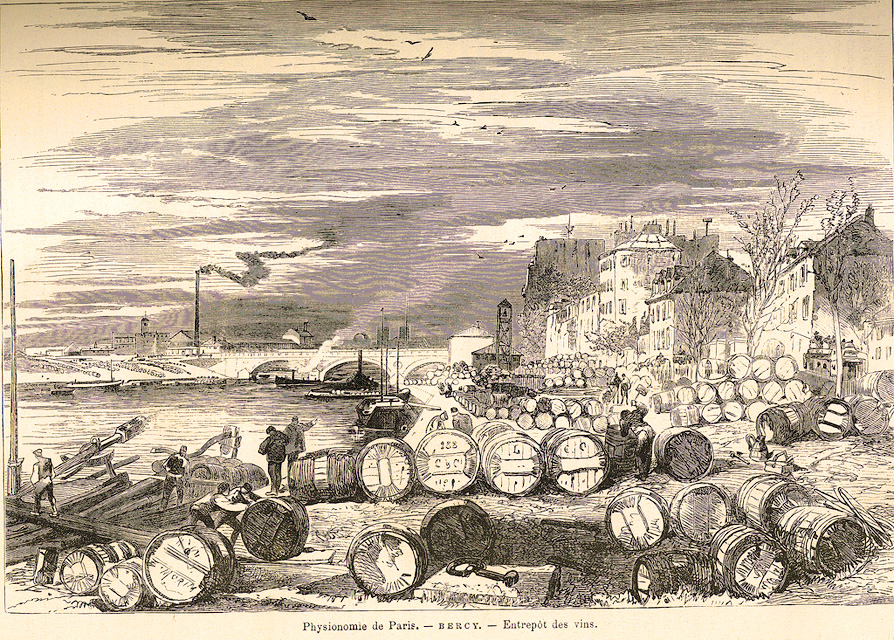
19th century etching of a wine depot at Bercy

The area next to the Seine that is now the 12th arrondissement was favoured by the French aristocracy as the site for their luxurious country estates. These included the "folie Rambouillet" which was built by the Protestant financier and royal counsellor, Nicolas de Rambouillet, between 1633 and 1635. The property was further developed by Madame de la Sablière (1636–1693), who received prominent non-Catholic ambassadors there prior to their formal entry into Paris. She also hosted elegant receptions and salons there and offered lodging to the poet, Jean de la Fontaine. The estate was particularly known for its gardens, which were left open for the public to visit. In 1719, the estate was sold to the banker John Law, who converted the gardens into leased vegetable plots.^{:16-17,} Located at about the current placement of the Gare de Lyon, the estate had been completely dismantled by 1737, as shown by a map of this area dated that year.^{:17}

Another major estate was the 17th and 18th century Château de Bercy, which straddled the village of Charenton and the eastern part of the 12th arrondissement. Its gardens were developed by the famous landscape architect, André le Notre. Built on a promontory overlooking the Seine, the Chateau offered broad views over formal French gardens and the river. Starting in 1804, the rapid development of the wine trade in the vicinity of the castle brought heavy river and road traffic and initiated what was to become a progressive abandonment of the property. The château itself was destroyed in 1861.

=== The Revolution and 19th century political turmoil ===
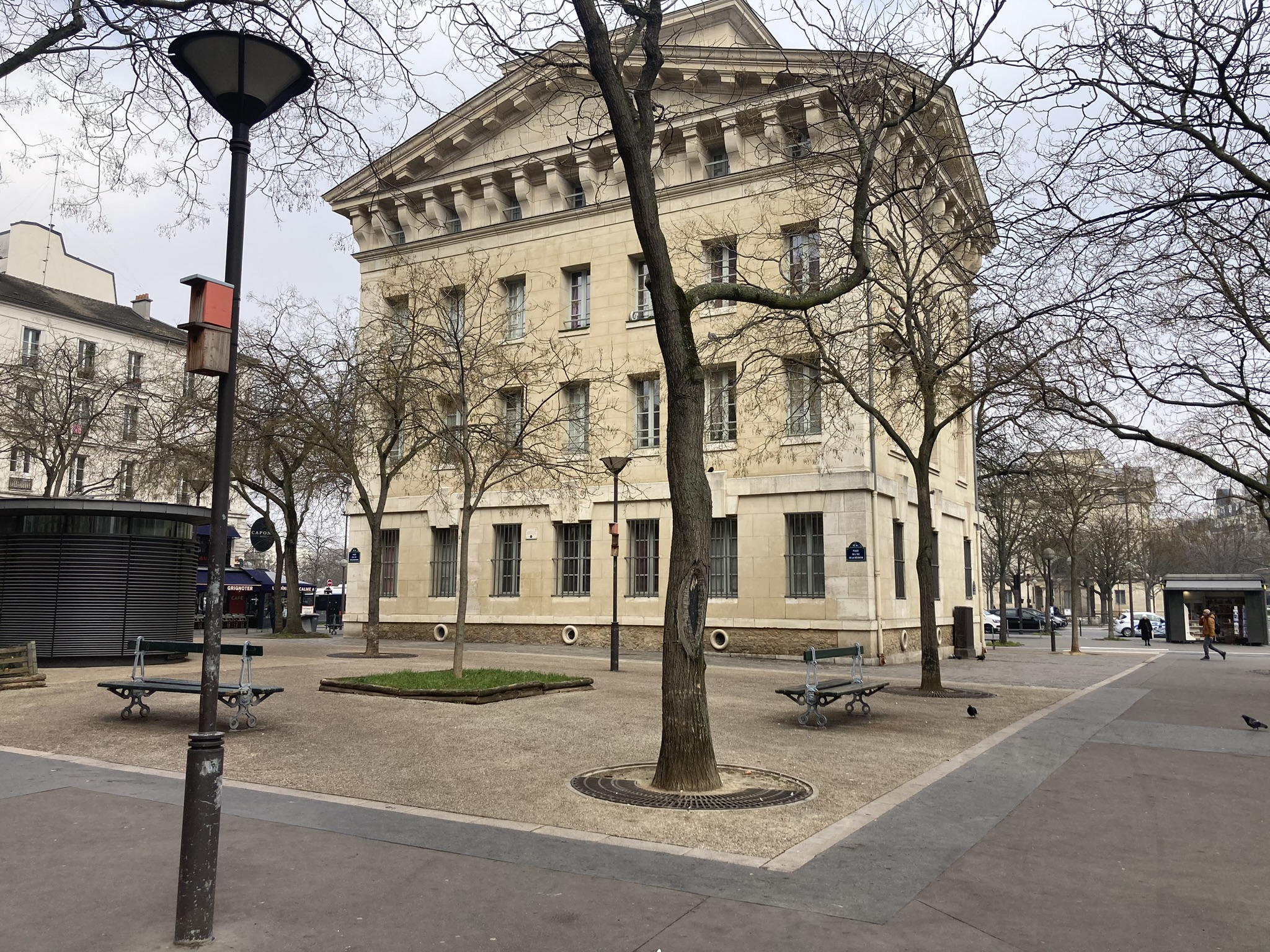
The Place de l'Île de la Réunion abuts the place de la Nation in the 12th arrondissement. This discreet square, located just east of the two tax pavilions and the two columns of the barrière du Trône, is the exact location of the guillotine du Trône.

The artisans and workers of the Faubourg played a key role in the French Revolution and the violent political turmoil of the 19th century. Residents of the Faubourg were instrumental in the taking of the Bastille on 14 July 1789. There were only seven prisoners left in the Bastille at that point and the action cost the lives of 98 attackers as well as most of the rather small contingent of soldiers charged with defending it. Of the 954 people who received official recognition for being 'conquerors of the Bastille', most were artisans and workers from the Faubourg Saint Antoine.^{:24}

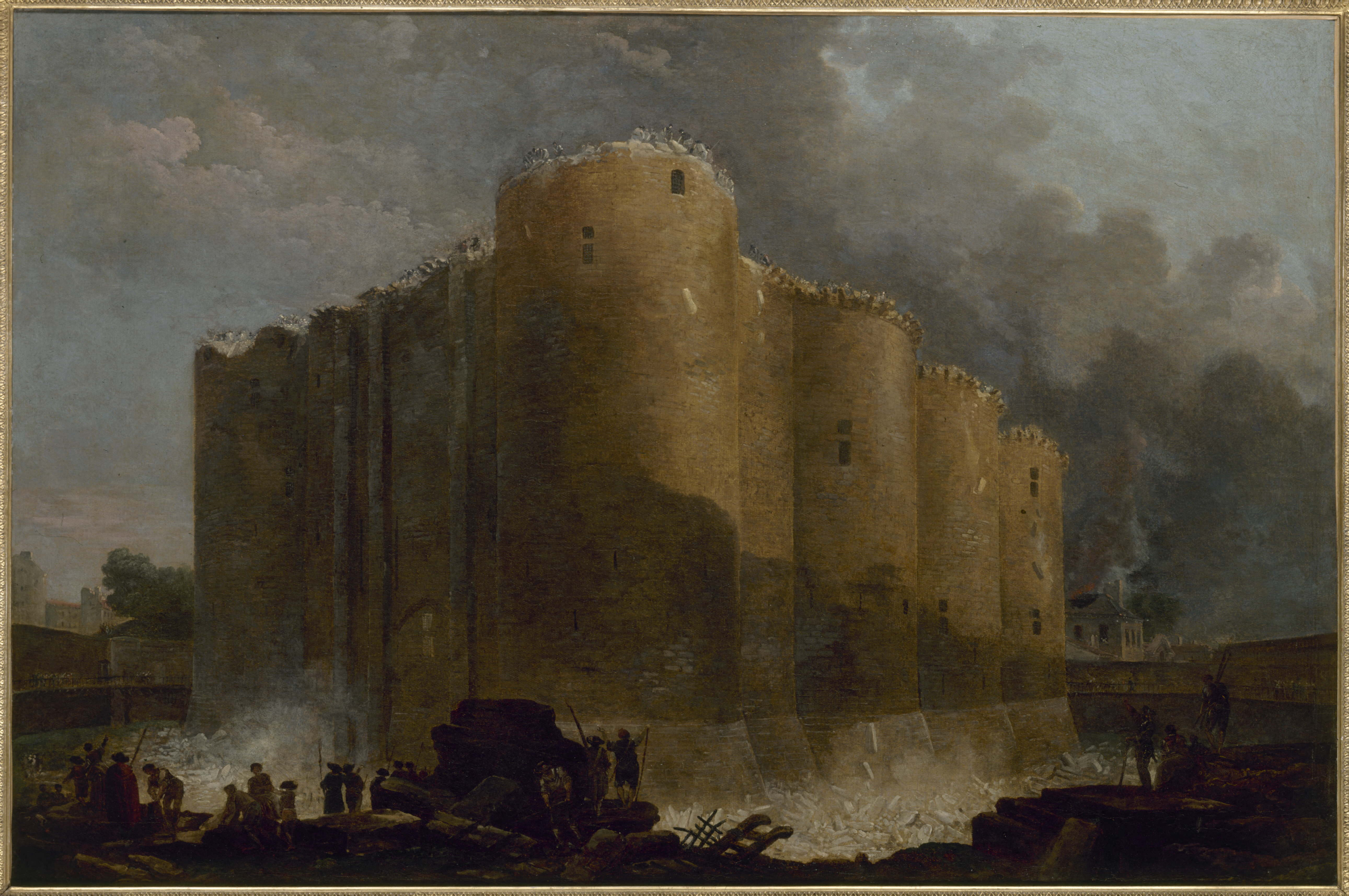
The Bastille in the first days of its demolition

The unauthorised demolition of the Bastille began the day after the Bastille was taken when an entrepreneurial business man, Pierre-François Palloy, recruited a team to tear down the fortress. Recovered construction materials were subsequently sold, along with various mementos of the infamous building (keys, paper weights, etc.).^{:272}

The neighbourhood also played a prominent role in the Reign of Terror that followed. In the southern part of what is now the Place de la Nation, a guillotine was erected in June 1794. Of the 2,639 people guillotined in Paris during the Revolution, 1,306 were beheaded there. Their bodies were then thrown into two mass graves in what is now the nearby Picpus Cemetery. After the Revolution, the Faubourg remained a hotbed of revolutionary activity, including during the July Revolution, the 1848 Revolution and the Paris Commune.

=== Urban development in the 19th century ===
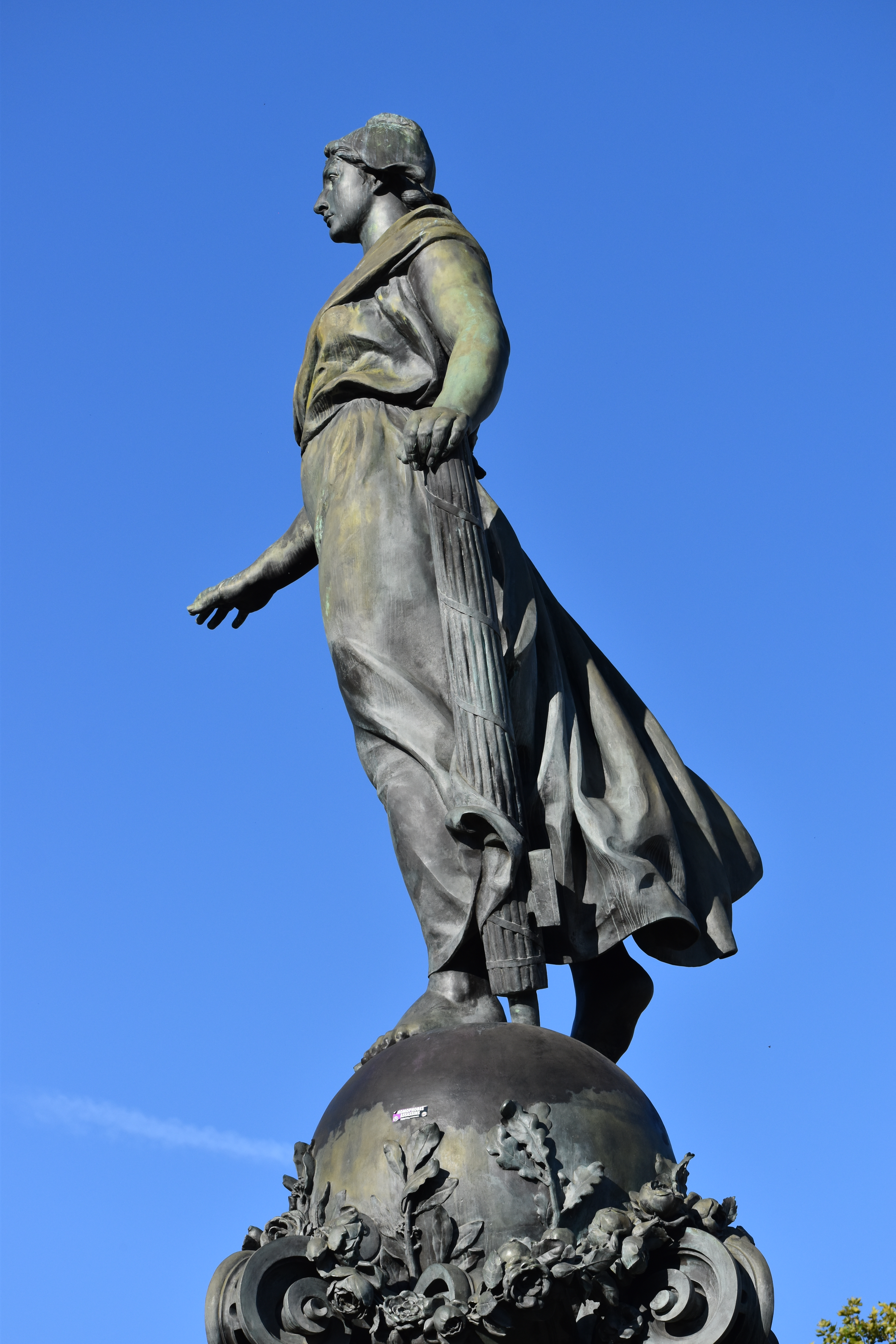
Detail from the statue, The Triumph of the Republic, in the centre of the Place de la Nation

From 1815 onwards, the neighbourhoods that would later become the 12th arrondissement were the focus of far-reaching urban development projects. These include construction of: the July Column (Colonne de Juillet) on the Place de la Bastille (1830); the Halle Beauvau (the covered market on the Rue d'Aligre, 1843); the mainline Gare de Lyon (1847–1852) and the Paris-Vincennes rail line that terminated at the Gare de la Bastille (1855). The development of the railway lines had a major impact on the 12th arrondissement; at its height, the rail network (including space for servicing it) accounted for 20% of the 12th arrondissement's land area and basically cut it in two.^{:65}

Haussmann was also active in this sector, creating arteries that would later take the names of boulevard Diderot (1854), rue Chaligny (1856), avenue Daumesnil (1859) and rue Crozatier (1861). Between 1855 and 1866, the Bois de Vincennes was refurbished by order of Napoleon III, who wanted it to become a "vast park for the working populations of eastern Paris".

La Place de la Nation received its current name on 14 July 1880. Prior to that date, it was called the place du Trône, in honour of the entry into Paris of Louis XIV and his new wife, Marie-Thérèse of Austria. The columns and associated taxation offices that can still be seen on the eastern portion of the place, were part of a much broader set of some 60 tax barriers surrounding Paris that were designed by the architect, Claude Ledoux. Built in 1787, tax officials were stationed there to collect revenues from people as they entered Paris with their merchandise. During the reign of Louis-Philippe (1830–1848), the statues of two French kings were placed on the tops of the two columns: Saint Louis (Louis IX) is on the 11th arrondissement side and Philippe Auguste on the 12th arrondissement side. The sculpture that dominates the central part of the Place, Jules Dalou's Le Triomphe de la République, was originally a contender, but not the winner, of a competition for a sculpture to be erected on the Place de la République. However, in 1880, responding to popular demand, the municipal council decided to order the statue for the Place de la Nation. Due to various delays, the finished statue in bronze was not installed on the site until 1899.^{:280}

=== Creation of the present-day arrondissement ===
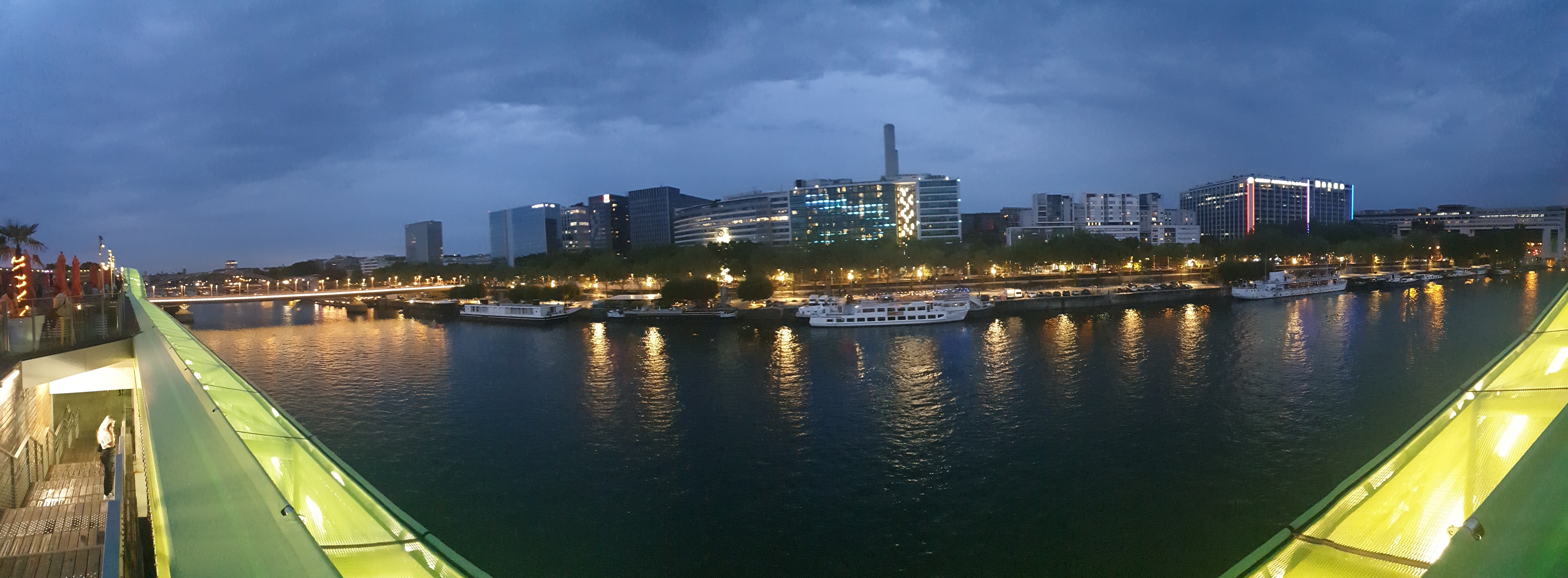
View of the 12th arrondissement of Paris at night from Les Docks, Cité de la mode et du design in 2022

From an administrative point of view, the present-day 12th arrondissement was created by law of 16 June 1859, which rearranged Paris into the 20 arrondissements known today. The law also extended the arrondissement by absorbing parts of the villages of Bercy (including the wine warehouses of Bercy) and Saint-Mandé.

The first town hall, located to the southeast of the current town hall, was burned down by the Commune. The current town hall was built in 1876 on Avenue Daumesnil, following the plans of architect Antoine-Julien Hénard.

The Bois de Vincennes was given to the City of Paris by Emperor Napoleon III in 1860, but was not officially integrated into the 12th arrondissement until 1926.

== Gallery — history ==
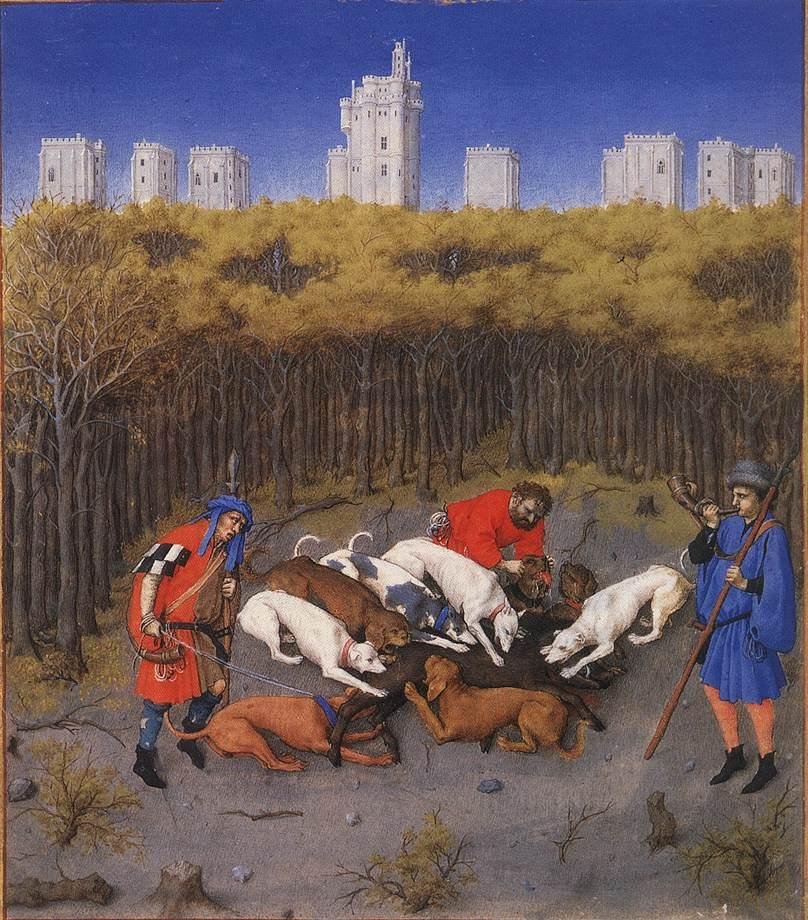
Château et bois de Vincennes, hunting scene from a medieval manuscript

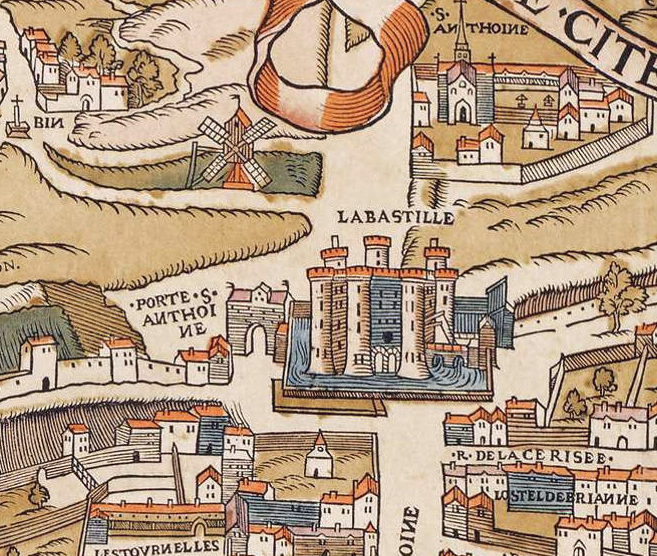
La Bastille and the Saint Antoine Abbey, around 1550

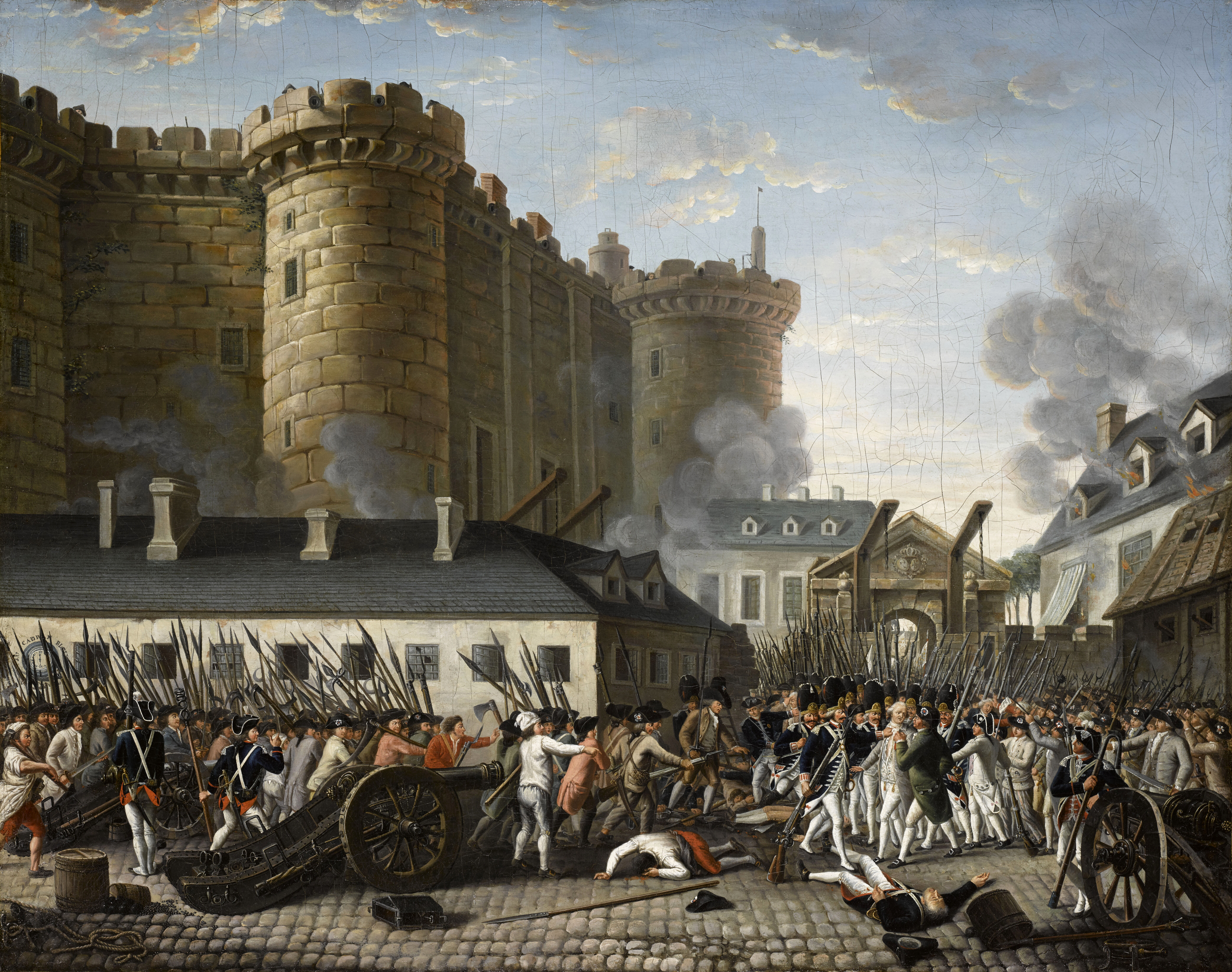
The taking of the Bastille

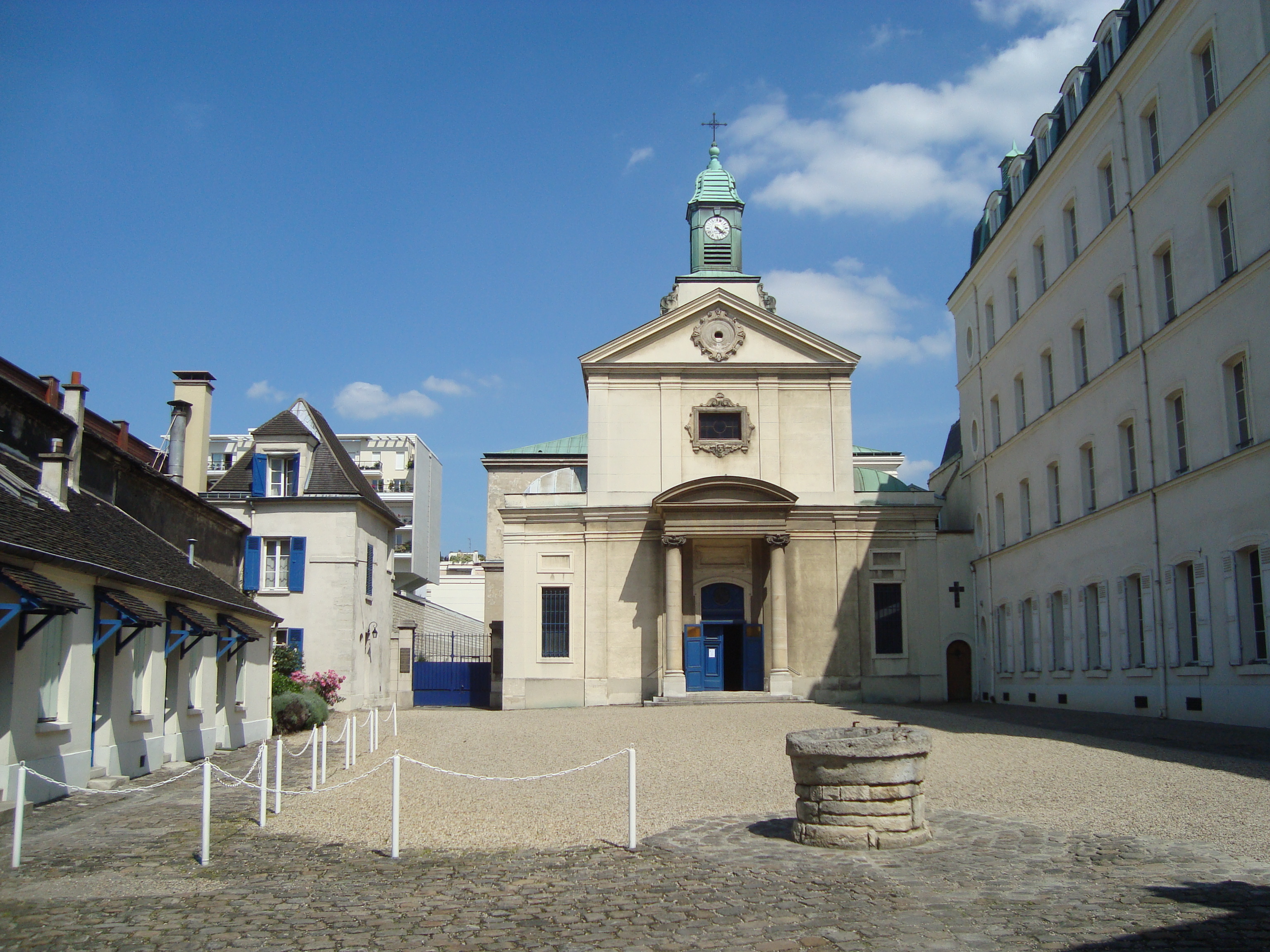
Entry to the Picpus Cemetery, the final resting place of 1306 victims of the local guillotine

== Urban renewal in the 20th century ==
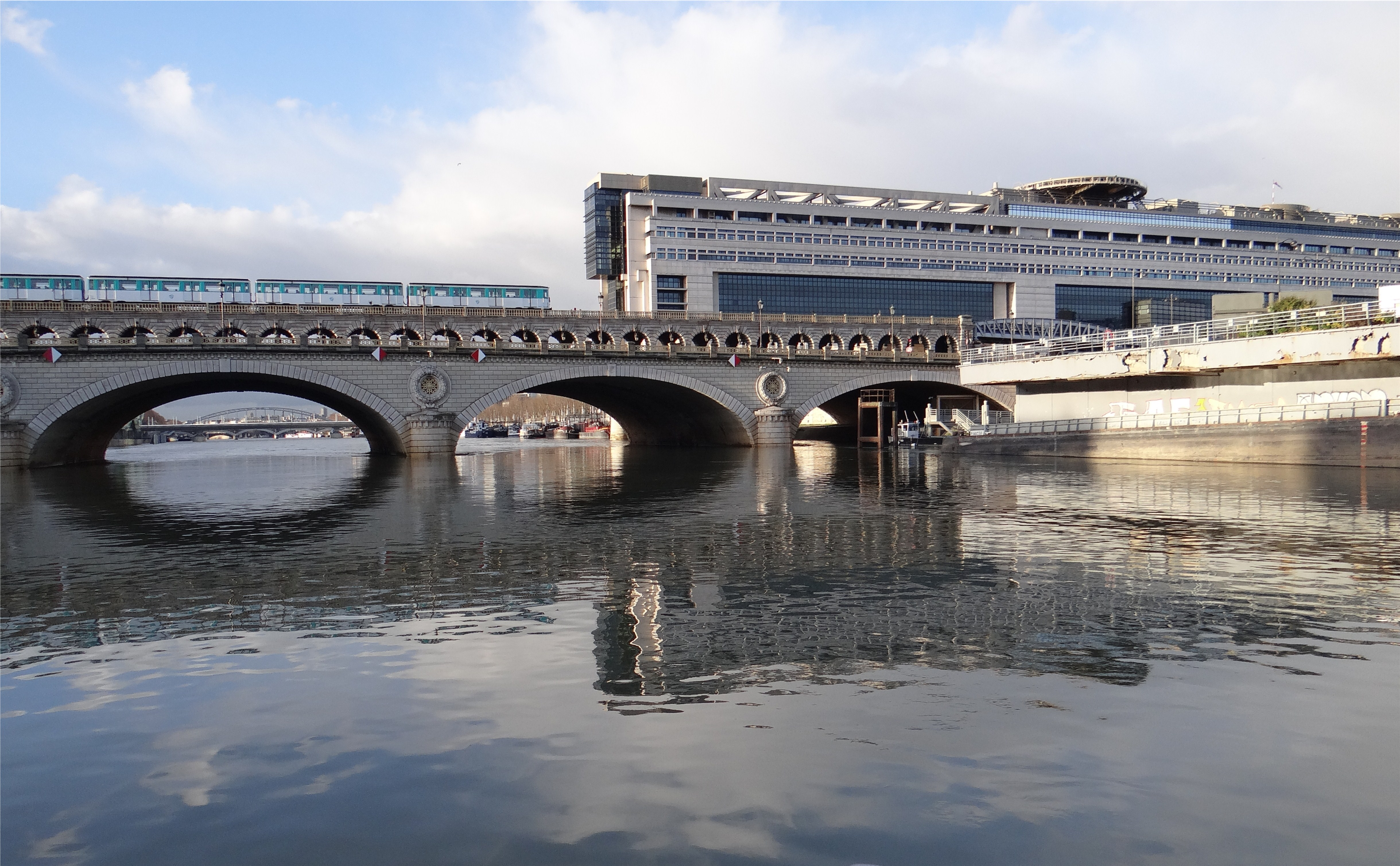
The Ministry of the Economy and Finance building

The arrondissement benefited from numerous urban renewal and public works projects, many of them initiated during the 1980s. Two of the eight 'Grands Projets of Francois Mitterrand' that were the hallmark of his presidency were located in the 12th arrondissement. These were the Opéra de la Bastille and the Ministry of the Economy and Finance building.

Major projects in the eastern section of the arrondissement include the French Ministry of Finances, Bercy Village, the Parc de Bercy and the Bercy arena, now renamed Accorhotels Arena. Much of the land these structures now occupy was formerly district of wine warehouses for wine and spirits arriving by river transport from Burgundy and the Loire.^{:284}

Opéra of the Bastille

Farther to the west, the arrondissement also features the Opéra de la Bastille, the second largest opera house in Paris. It was inaugurated by Francois Mitterrand in 1989, on the 200th anniversary of the storming of the Bastille.

The Coulée verte René-Dumont (or Promenade plantée) was developed at the same time as the Opéra de la Bastille. It is a 4.7 km (2.9 mi) elevated linear park built on top of obsolete railway infrastructure. The Viaduc des Arts, a string of workshops for skilled artisans, is also part of this development. It is located at the base of the western part of the Coulée verte René-Dumont.

== Places of interest ==
Like most neighbourhoods in Paris, the 12th arrondissement offers a rich array of historically important and aesthetically appealing sites. For the 12th, these sites emerged mainly from development during the 19th century and from the late 20th century urban renewal projects. They include:

- Place de la Bastille (shared by the 4th, 11th and 12th arrondissements)
- Opéra Bastille
- Faubourg Saint-Antoine
- Bois de Vincennes
- Château de Vincennes
- Jardin du Bassin de l'Arsenal
- Cimetière de Picpus
- Musée des Arts Forains
- Palais de la Porte Dorée (Cité nationale de l'histoire de l'immigration)
- Palais Omnisports de Paris-Bercy
- Parc de Bercy
- Paris Zoological Park (also known as Zoo de Vincennes)
- Promenade plantée
- Viaduc des arts.

== Gallery — places of interest ==
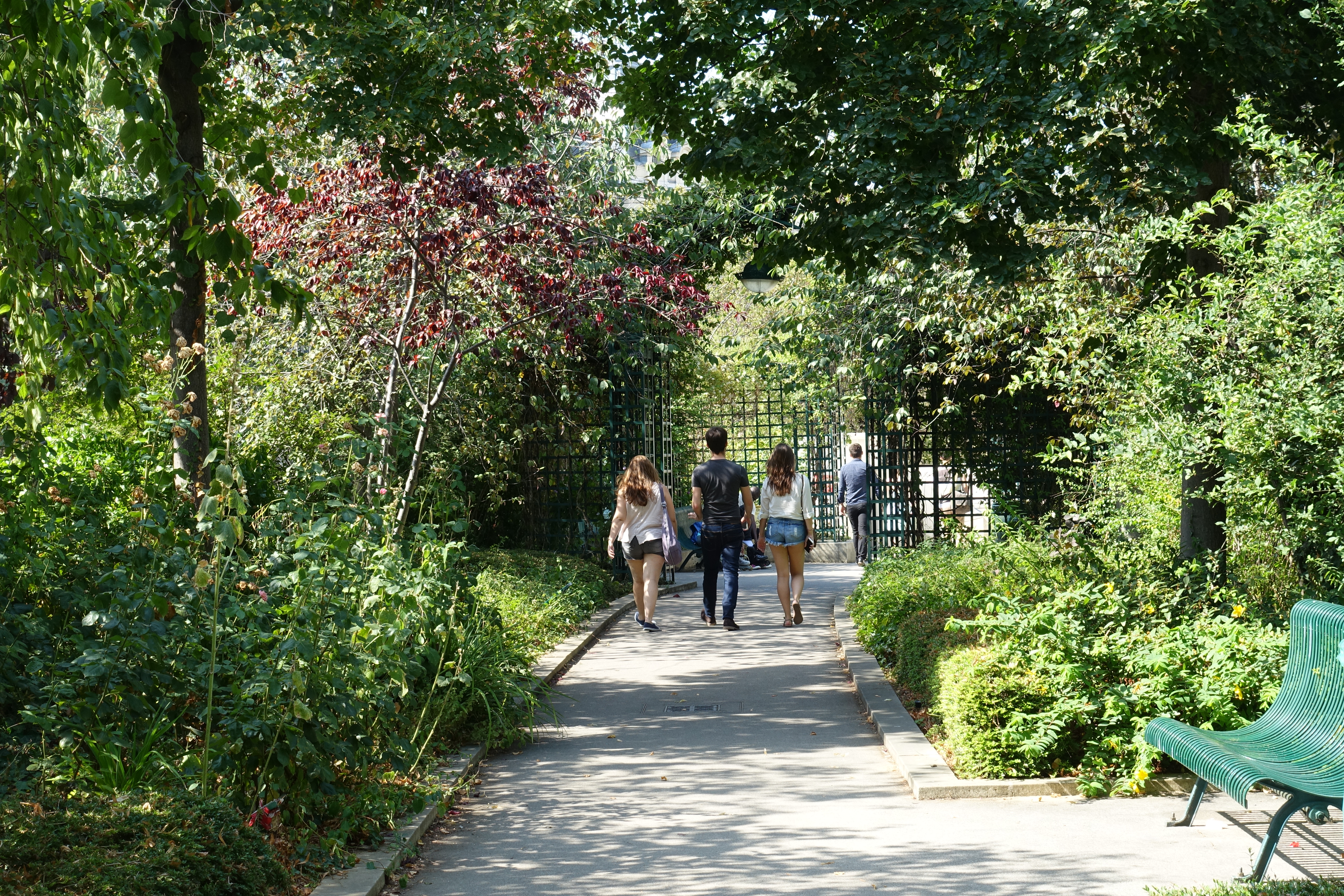
The eastern section of the Coulée verte.

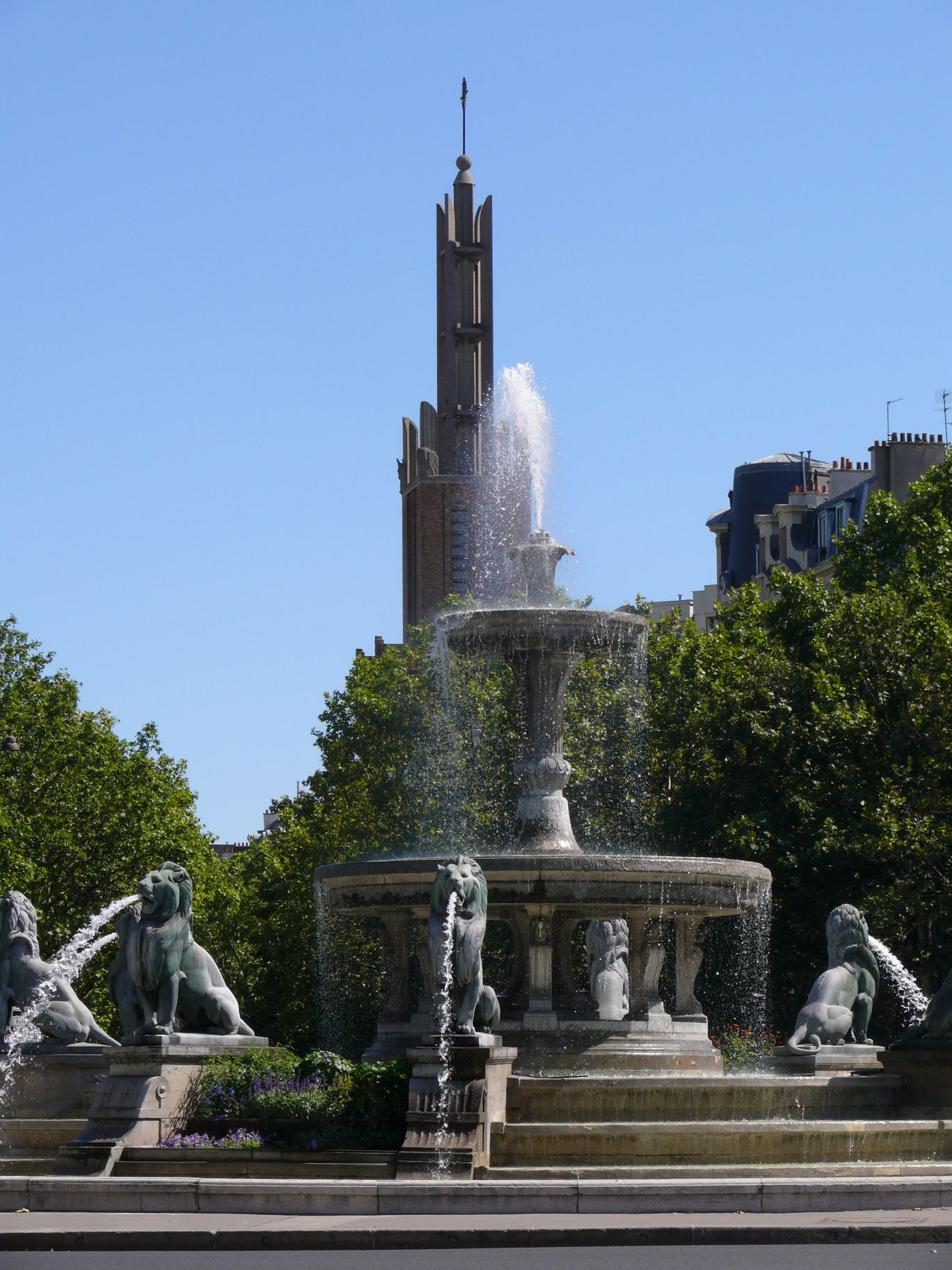
The Place Félix Éboué.

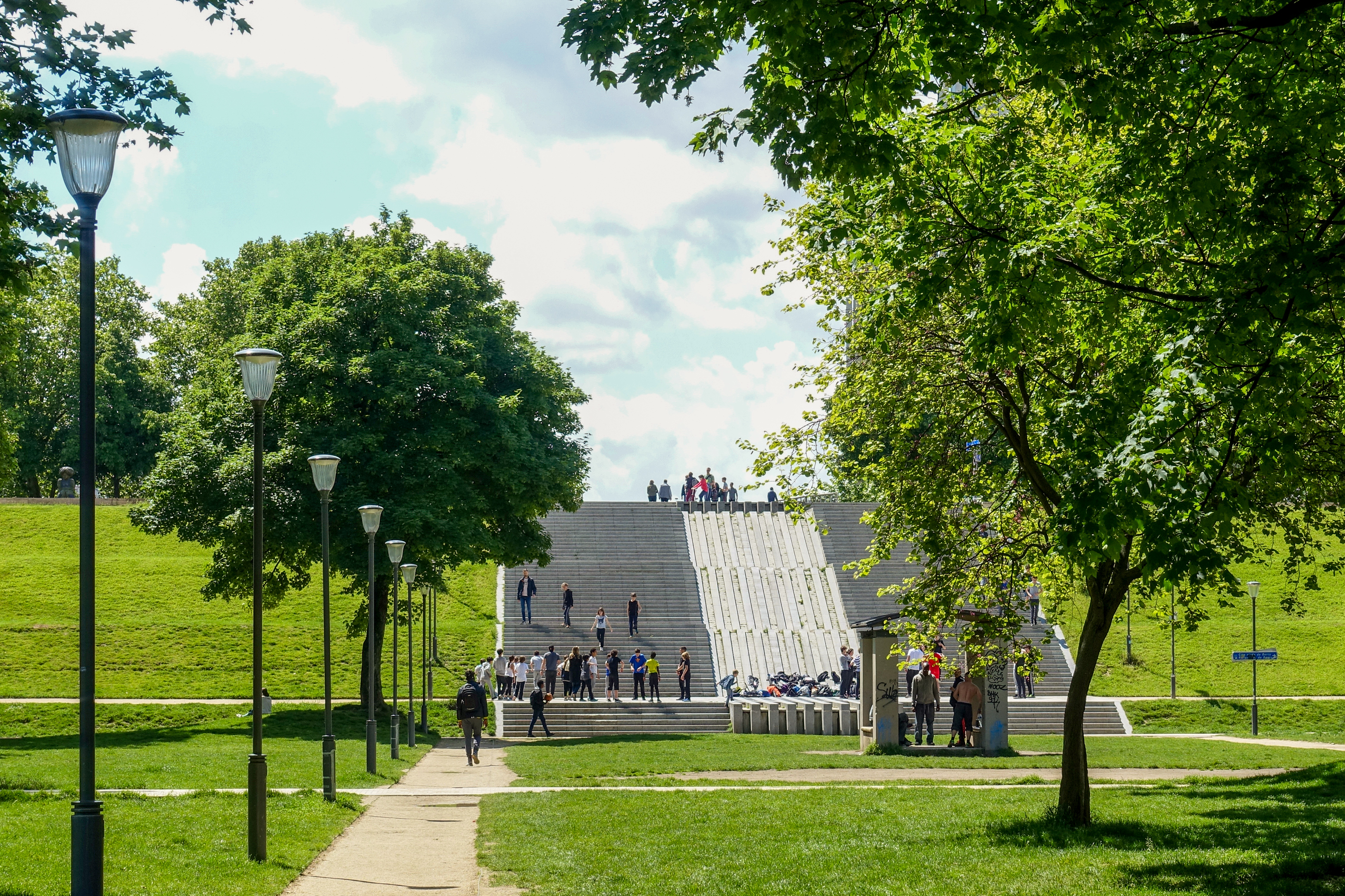
The Parc de Bercy.

The July Column and the Opera de la Bastille.

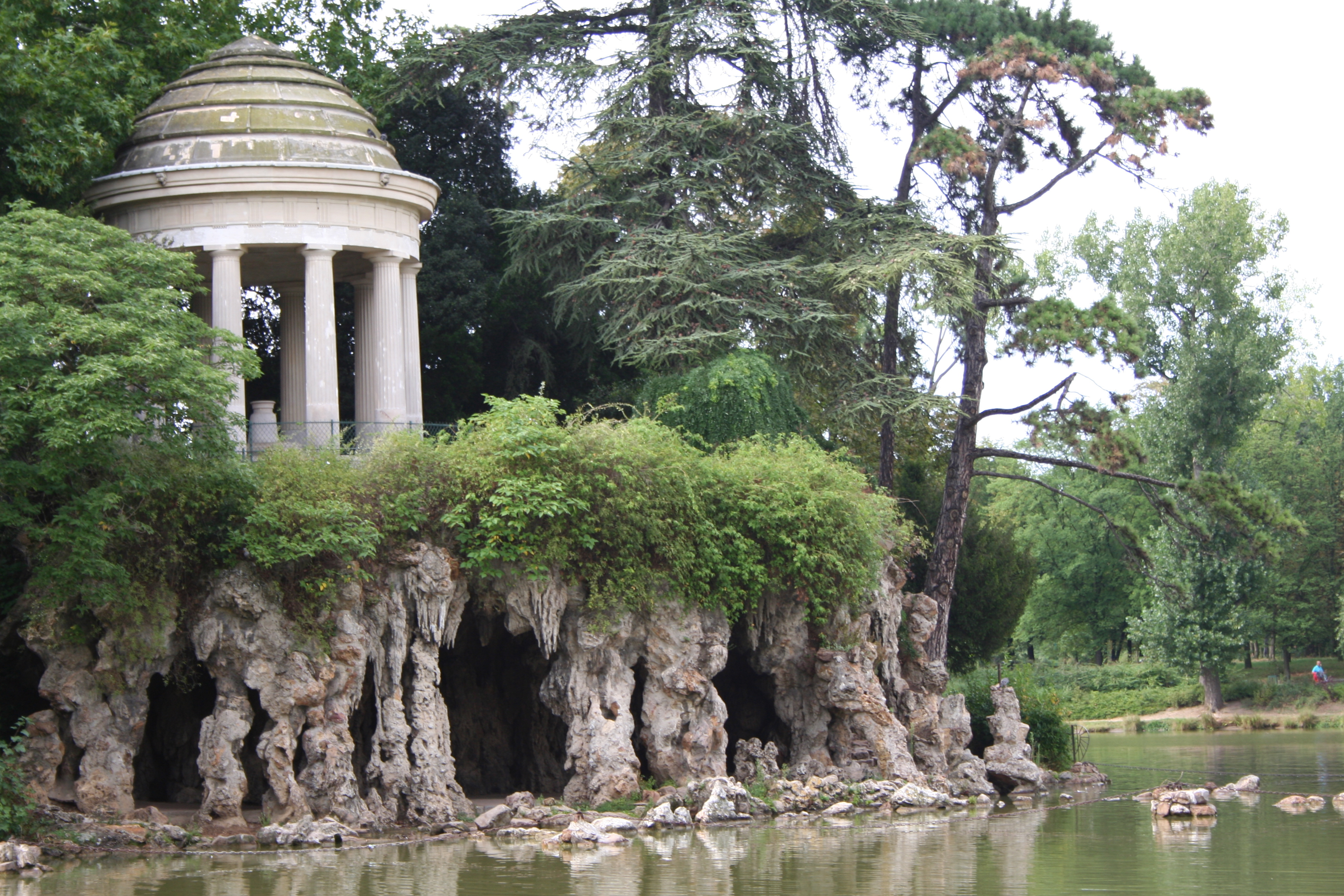
The Bois de Vincennes.

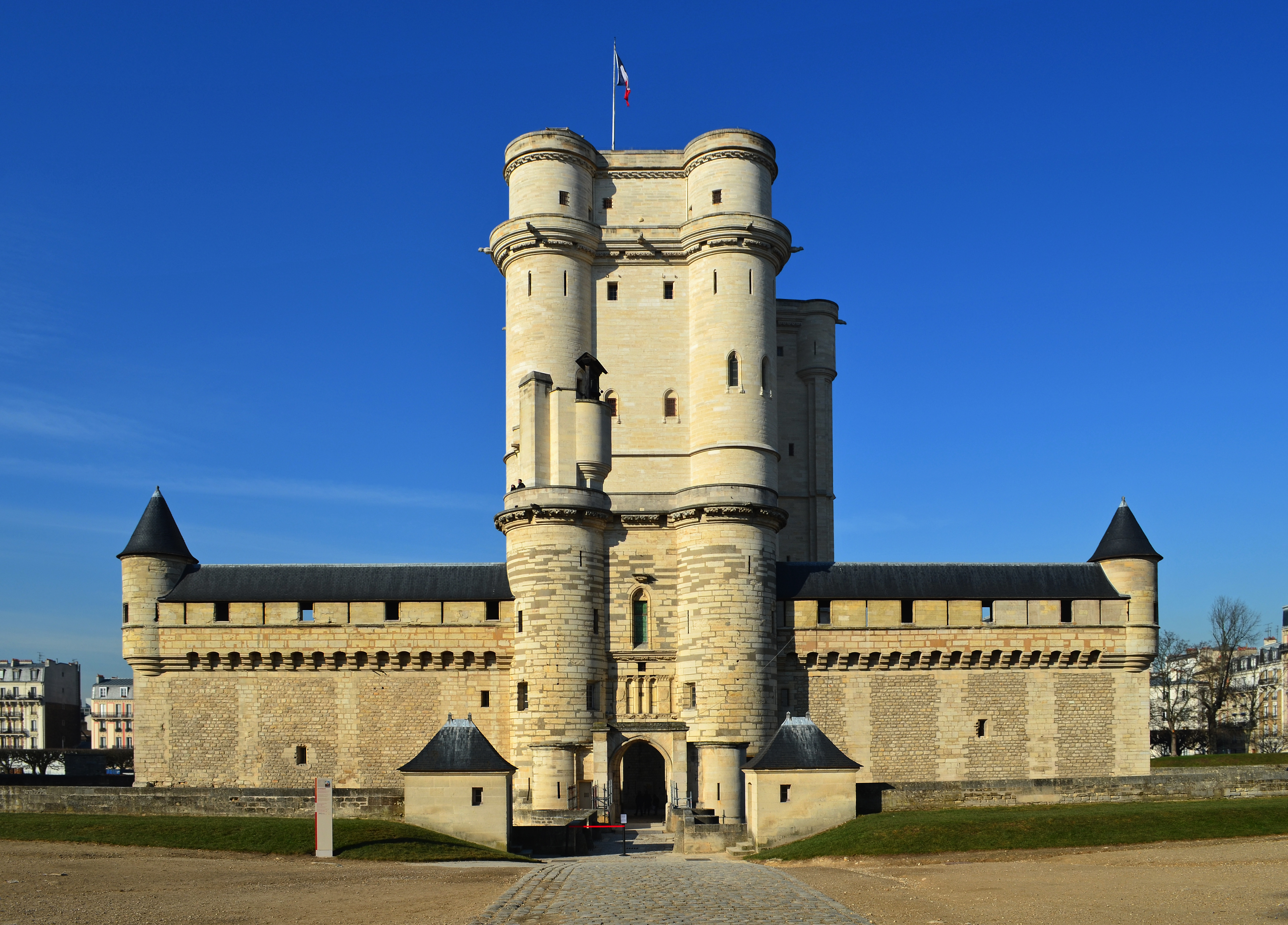
The Château de Vincennes.

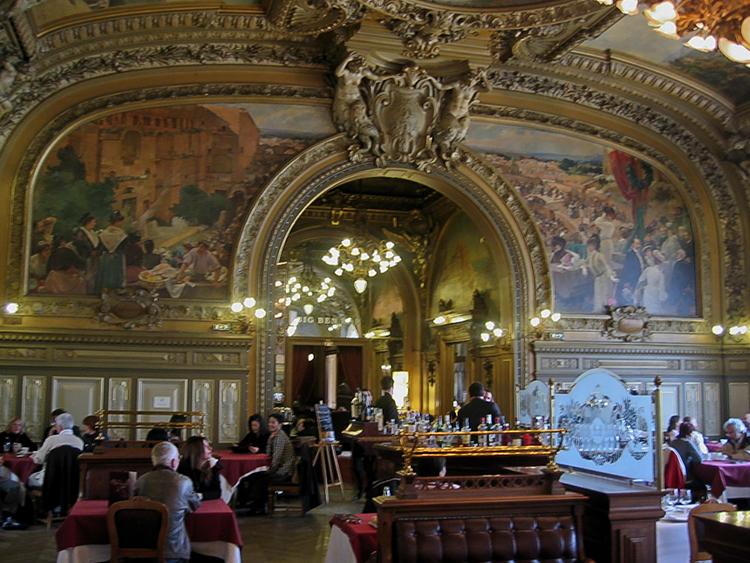
The Train Bleu restaurant, Gare de Lyon.

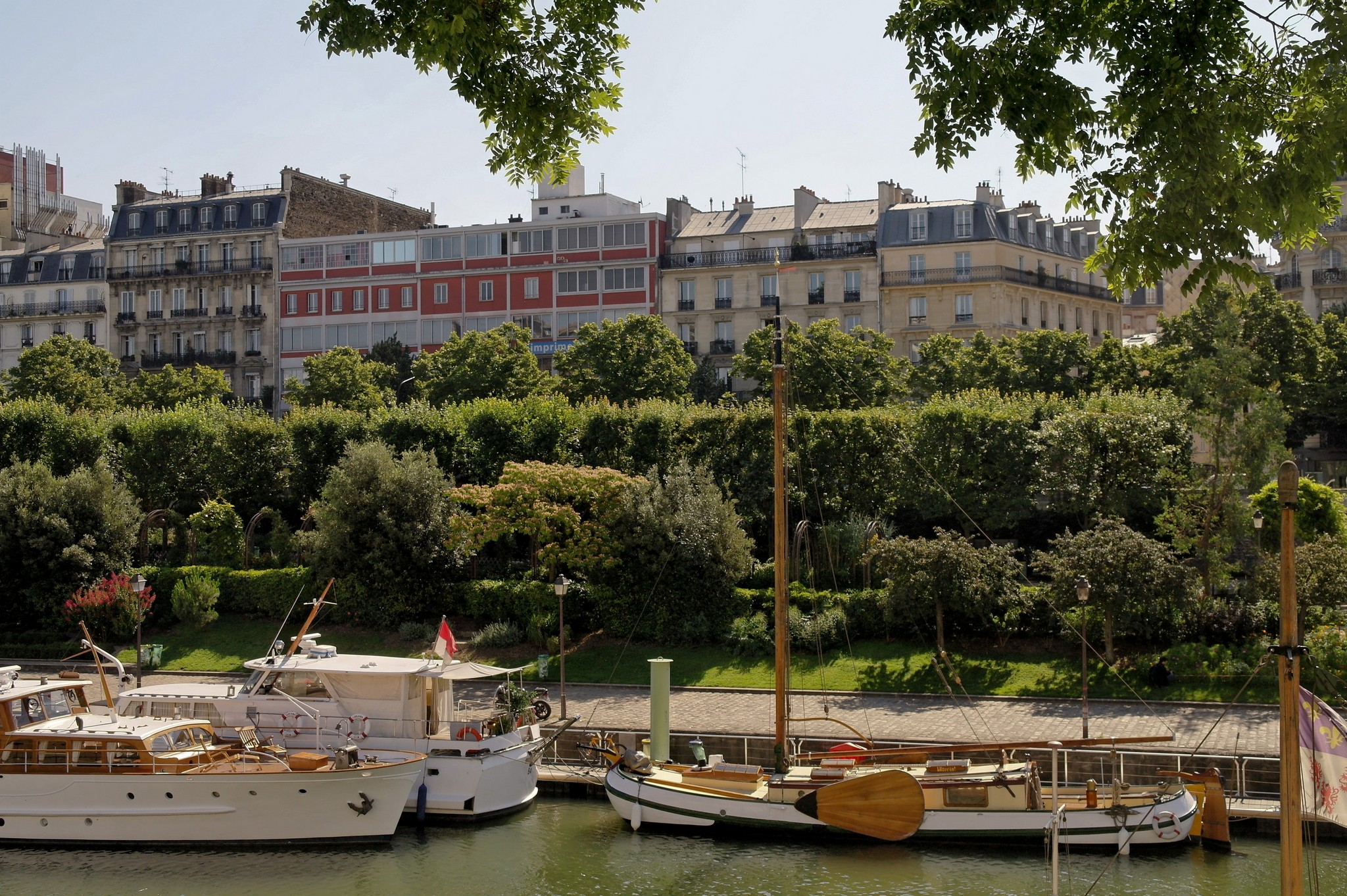
The Bassin de l' Arsenal.

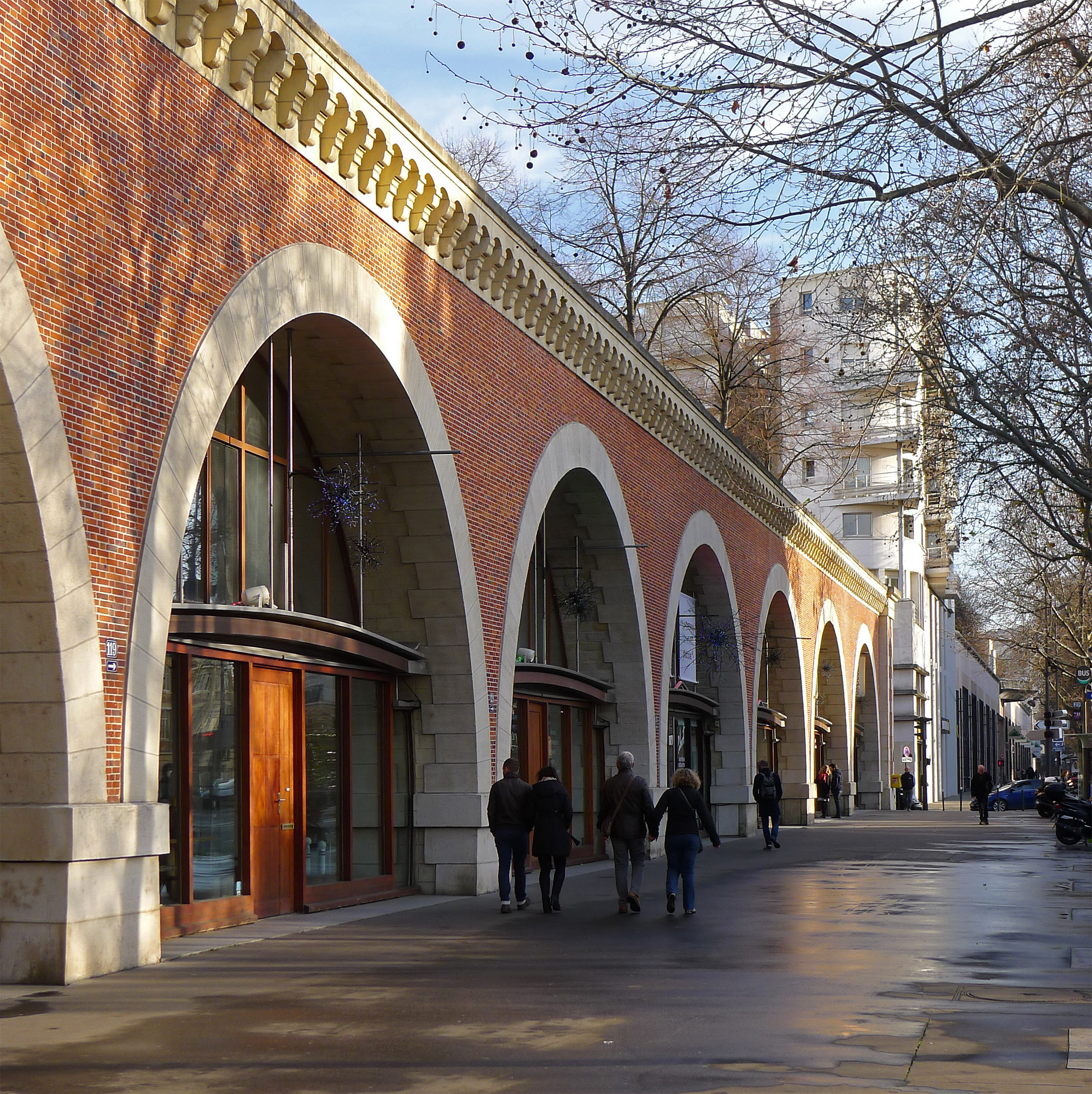
Le Viaduc des Arts.

== Geography ==
The quarters of the 12th arrondissement

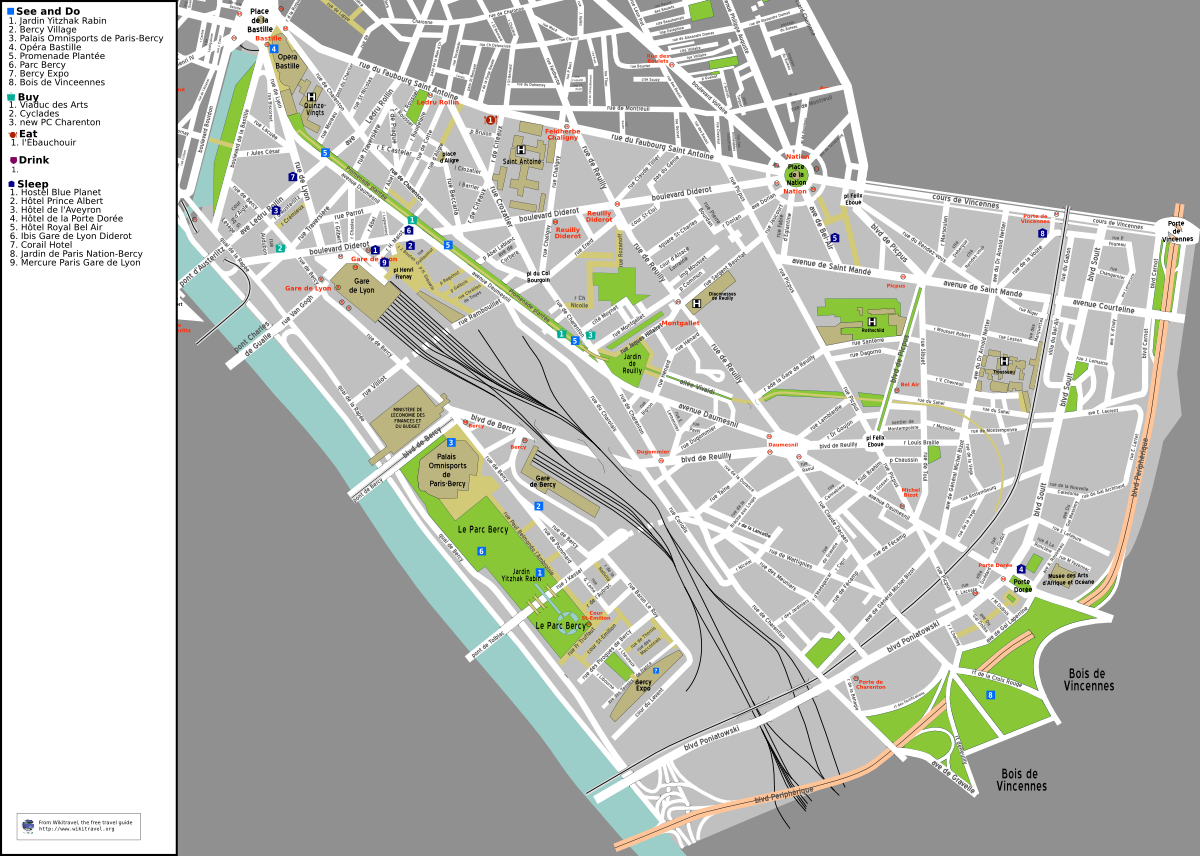
Map of the 12th arrondissement

The land area of this arrondissement is 16.324 km^{2} (6.303 sq mi; 4,034 acres), two-thirds of which consists of the Bois de Vincennes park. Excluding the Bois de Vincennes, its land area is 6.377 km^{2} (2.462 sq mi; 1,576 acres).

The arrondissement consists of four quarters:

- Quartier Bel-Air (45)
- Quartier Picpus (46)
- Quartier Bercy (47)
- Quartier Quinze-Vingts (48)

== Demographics ==
The peak of population of Paris's 12th arrondissement occurred in 1962 and was followed by three decades of decline. More recently, however, the population has begun to grow again, especially since the urban renewal projects of the 1990s. However, after 2012 the population showed a slight decline.

=== Historical population ===
Historical population

Year	Pop.	±% p.a.
1861	65,748	—
1872	87,678	+2.65%
1881	103,468	+1.86%
1891	111,665	+0.77%
1901	130,062	+1.54%
1911	151,014	+1.50%
1921	151,810	+0.05%
1931	157,277	+0.35%
1936	156,729	−0.07%
1946	153,633	−0.20%
1954	158,437	+0.39%

Year	Pop.	±% p.a.
1962	161,574	+0.25%
1968	155,982	−0.59%
1975	140,900	−1.44%
1982	138,015	−0.30%
1990	130,257	−0.72%
1999	136,591	+0.53%
2007	142,425	+0.52%
2012	144,925	+0.35%
2017	140,296	−0.65%
2023	138,024	−0.27%

Source: Demographia (1861-1999) and INSEE (1876-2023)

=== Immigration ===
Place of birth of residents of the 12th arrondissement in 1999
Born in metropolitan France	Born outside metropolitan France			
81.2%	18.8%			
81.2%	Born in overseas France	Born in foreign countries with French citizenship at birth^{1}	EU-15 immigrants^{2}	Non-EU-15 immigrants
81.2%	1.2%	4.1%	3.2%	10.3%
^{1} This group is made up largely of former French settlers, such as pieds-noirs in Northwest Africa, followed by former colonial citizens who had French citizenship at birth (such as was often the case for the native elite in French colonies), as well as to a lesser extent foreign-born children of French expatriates. A foreign country is understood as a country not part of France in 1999, so a person born for example in 1950 in Algeria, when Algeria was an integral part of France, is nonetheless listed as a person born in a foreign country in French statistics.^{2} An immigrant is a person born in a foreign country not having French citizenship at birth. An immigrant may have acquired French citizenship since moving to France, but is still considered an immigrant in French statistics. On the other hand, persons born in France with foreign citizenship (the children of immigrants) are not listed as immigrants.
