= Bercy station =

Bercy station could refer to:

- Gare de Paris Bercy, a railway station in Paris
- Bercy station (Paris Metro), a Paris Metro station beneath the railway station
