= Bercy station (Paris Metro) =

Metro station in Paris, France

Bercy
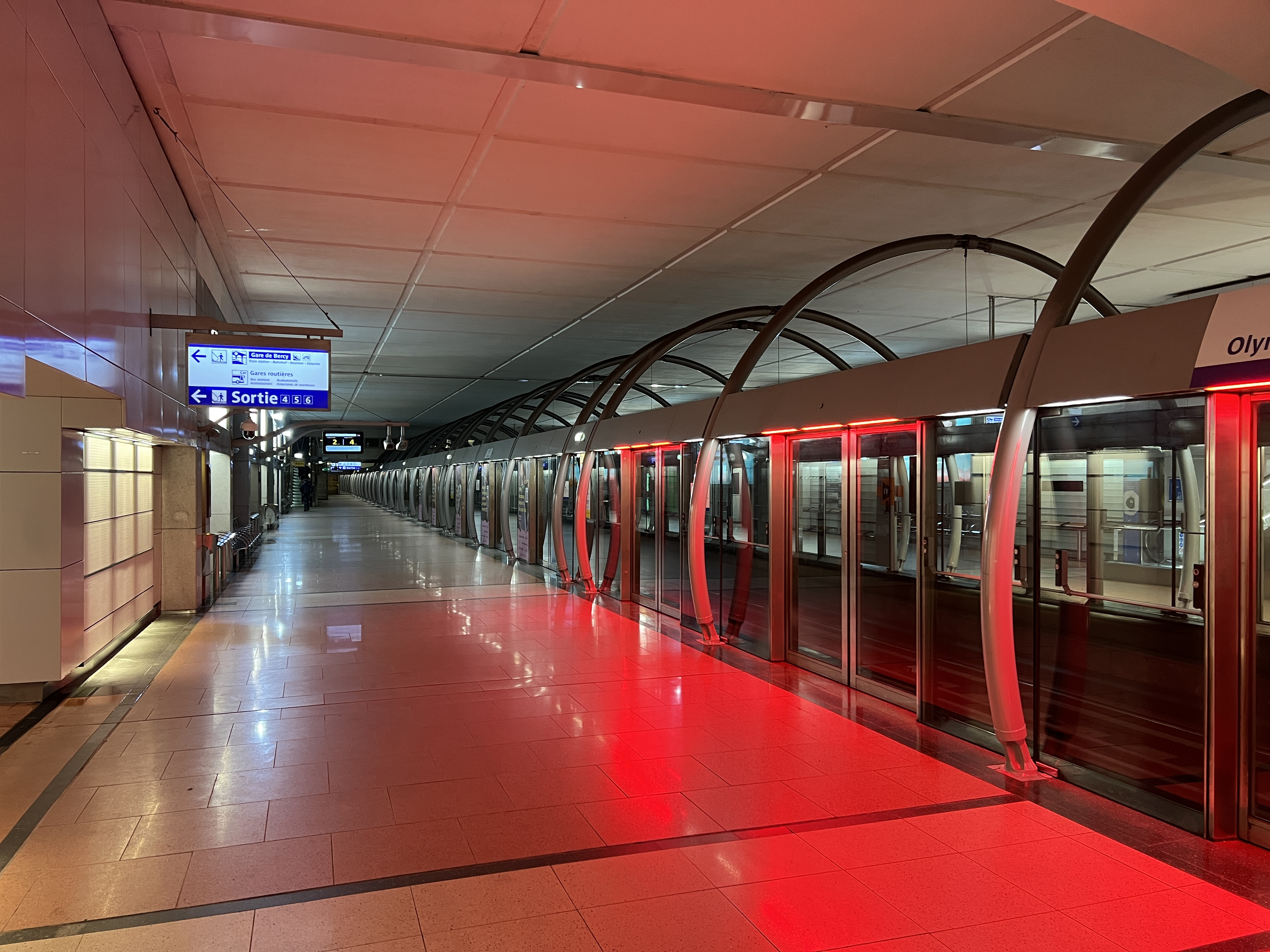
- Line 14 platforms at Bercy with red lights above the platform screen doors indicating the arrival of a short train

General information
- Location: Place du Bataillon-du-Pacifique; 48 Boul. de Bercy; Rue Corbineau; 12th arrondissement of Paris; Île-de-France; France
- Coordinates: 48°50′24″N 2°22′50″E
- Owner: RATP
- Platforms: 4 side platforms
- Tracks: 4
- Connections: at Gare de Paris Bercy; RATP Bus: 24 71 87 215; Noctilien: N32 N35

Construction
- Structure type: Underground
- Accessible: Line 6: No; Line 14: Yes

Other information
- Station code: 13-07; BCY
- Fare zone: 1

History
- Opened: 1 March 1909
- Rebuilt: 1998

Services
Preceding station	Paris Metro	Following station
Quai de la Gare towards Charles de Gaulle–Étoile	Line 6	Dugommier towards Nation
Gare de Lyon towards Saint-Denis–Pleyel	Line 14	Cour Saint-Émilion towards Aéroport d'Orly
Location
- Location within Paris

Bercy station (French pronunciation: [bɛʁsi]) is a below-ground station on lines 6 and 14 of the Paris Métro. It is located at the intersection of the Boulevard de Bercy and the Rue de Bercy in the 12th arrondissement. West of the station, Line 6 goes above ground and crosses the Seine to the Rive Gauche on the Pont de Bercy.

== History ==
The station opened on 1 March 1909 when Line 6 was opened from Nation to Place d'Italie. (Line 6 was extended from Place d’Italie to Etoile in 1942.). The Line 14 platforms opened on 15 October 1998 as part of the original section of the line from Madeleine to Bibliothèque François Mitterrand.

The station is named after the Rue de Bercy and the Boulevard de Bercy whose intersection lies above it. The intersection is on the site of the Barrière de Bercy, one of the gates in the Wall of the Farmers-General (1784-1860), where taxes were collected on goods brought into the city. The Rue and the Boulevard were named after the commune of Bercy, which upon its creation in 1790 stretched along the Seine from the present-day Boulevard de Bercy to Charenton-le-Pont, much of it controlled during the Middle Ages by the lords of Bercy. When Paris annexed its near suburbs in 1860, the commune was partitioned and Bercy became a district in the new 12th arrondissement bounded by what is now the Boulevard de Bercy, Boulevard de Charenton, Boulevard Périphérique, and the Seine.

From 1972 to 1974, during the pneumatisation of Line 6, the Gare de Paris Bercy, located south of the station, was used to carry out this work.

On 16 July 2018, several name signs of the station are temporarily replaced to celebrate the victory of the France national football team at the 2018 FIFA World Cup, as in five other stations. Bercy was humorously renamed Bercy les Bleus (for "Merci les Bleus") as a thank you to the players of the French team.

== Passenger services ==
=== Access ===
The station has several exits:

- Access 1, "Bercy Arena": two stairs and an elevator Place du Bataillon-du-Pacifique;
- Access 2, "Rue Corbineau": a staircase at 48, Boulevard de Bercy;
- Access 3, "Gare de Bercy": a fixed staircase on the Rue de Bercy, odd side and two fixed stairs each lined with an escalator on the even side.

=== Station layout ===
G	Street Level	Exit/Entrance
B1	Mezzanine	to Exits/Entrances
B2	Side platform, doors will open on the right
B2	Westbound	← toward Charles de Gaulle–Étoile (Quai de la Gare)
B2	Eastbound	toward Nation (Dugommier) →
B2	Side platform, doors will open on the right
B3	Side platform with PSDs, doors will open on the right
B3	Northbound	← toward Saint-Denis–Pleyel (Gare de Lyon)
B3	Southbound	toward Aéroport d'Orly (Cour Saint-Émilion) →
B3	Side platform with PSDs, doors will open on the right

=== Platforms ===
The platforms of the two lines are of standard configuration. Two per stopping point, they are separated by the metro tracks located in the centre. A connection connects the two tunnels, between the track direction Mairie de Saint-Ouen of Line 14 and the track direction Étoile of Line 6.

Line 6 station has an elliptical vault. The decoration is of the style used for most Métro stations, bevelled white ceramic tiles cover the walls, vault and tunnel exits, while lighting is provided by two tube-canopies. The advertising frames are metallic; the name of the station is inscribed in Parisine font on enamelled plaques. The platforms are equipped with wooden slatted benches.

The architecture of the station of Line 14 follows the principles defined by Bernard Kohn for the whole of Line 14 since 1991, both in the choice of materials (light concrete ceilings, wood on the walls, floor tiles) and for lighting and ceiling height. The platforms are also wider than those of the other lines. The name of the station is written in Parisine font on backlit panels embedded in the walls and on stickers affixed to the platform facades.

== Nearby ==
- The office complex of the Ministry of the Economy and Finance (Ministère de l'Économie et des Finances), each nicknamed simply "Bercy", is located to the west of the station.
- Accor Arena (formerly Palais Omnisports de Paris-Bercy or POPB), a major sports and music arena, is located to the south of the station.
- The Parc de Bercy extends southeast of the Arena on 14 ha (35 ac) between the Rue de Bercy and the Seine. The Arena was built in the 1980s and the Parc in the 1990s on the site of the Entrepôts de Bercy, a complex of wine warehouses that grew up outside the tax wall in the early 19th century.
- The Cinémathèque Française, formerly the American Center, designed by Frank Gehry, is 400 meters east on the Rue de Bercy.
- East of the station, on the Boulevard de Bercy, is the Gare de Paris-Bercy-Bourgogne-Pays d'Auvergne (formerly the Gare de Bercy), serving medium-distance domestic rail services to Avallon via Laroche-Migennes, Sens and Auxerre. Between the two is the Gare de Bercy bus terminal.

== Gallery ==
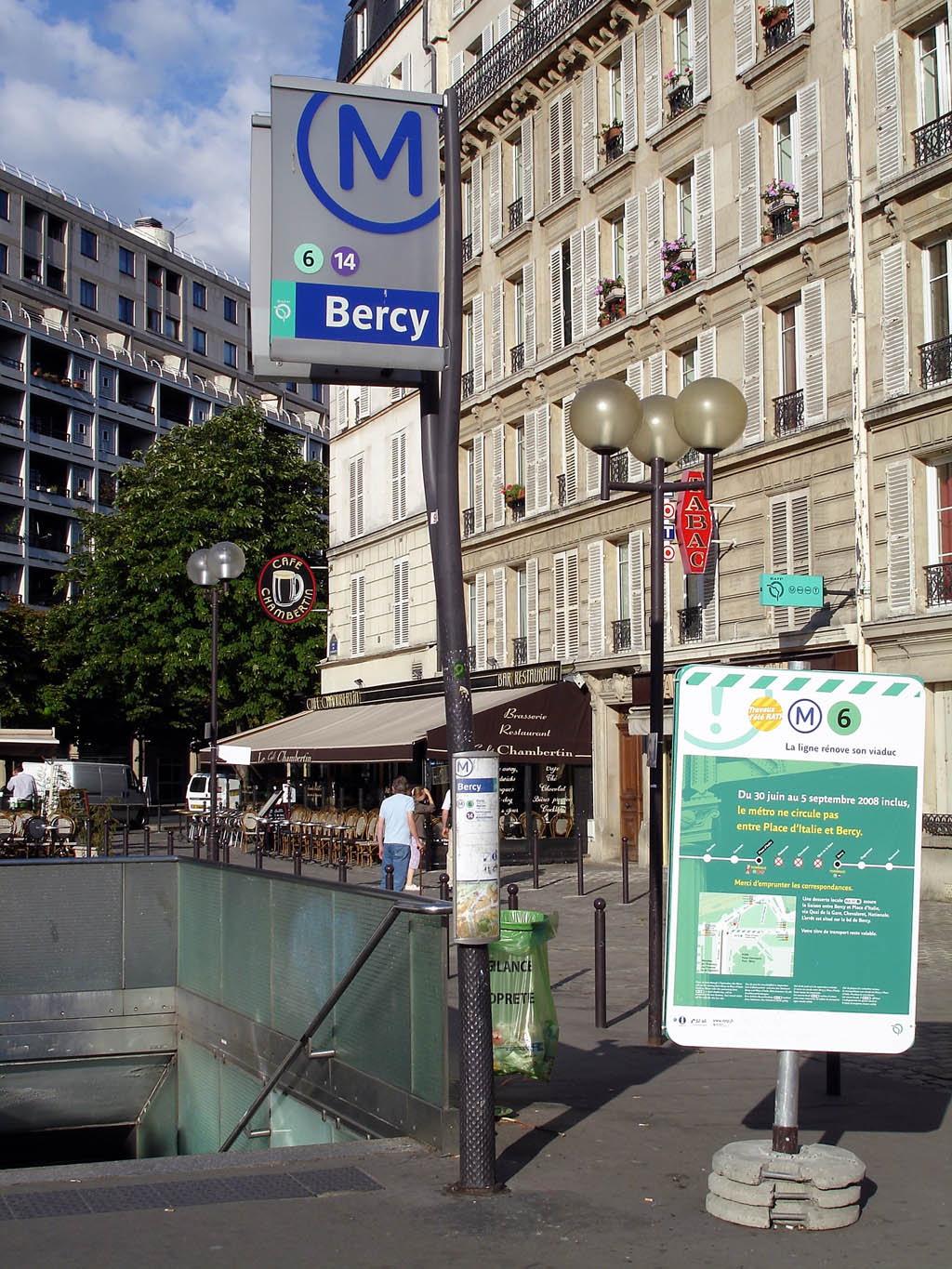
Street-level entrance at Bercy

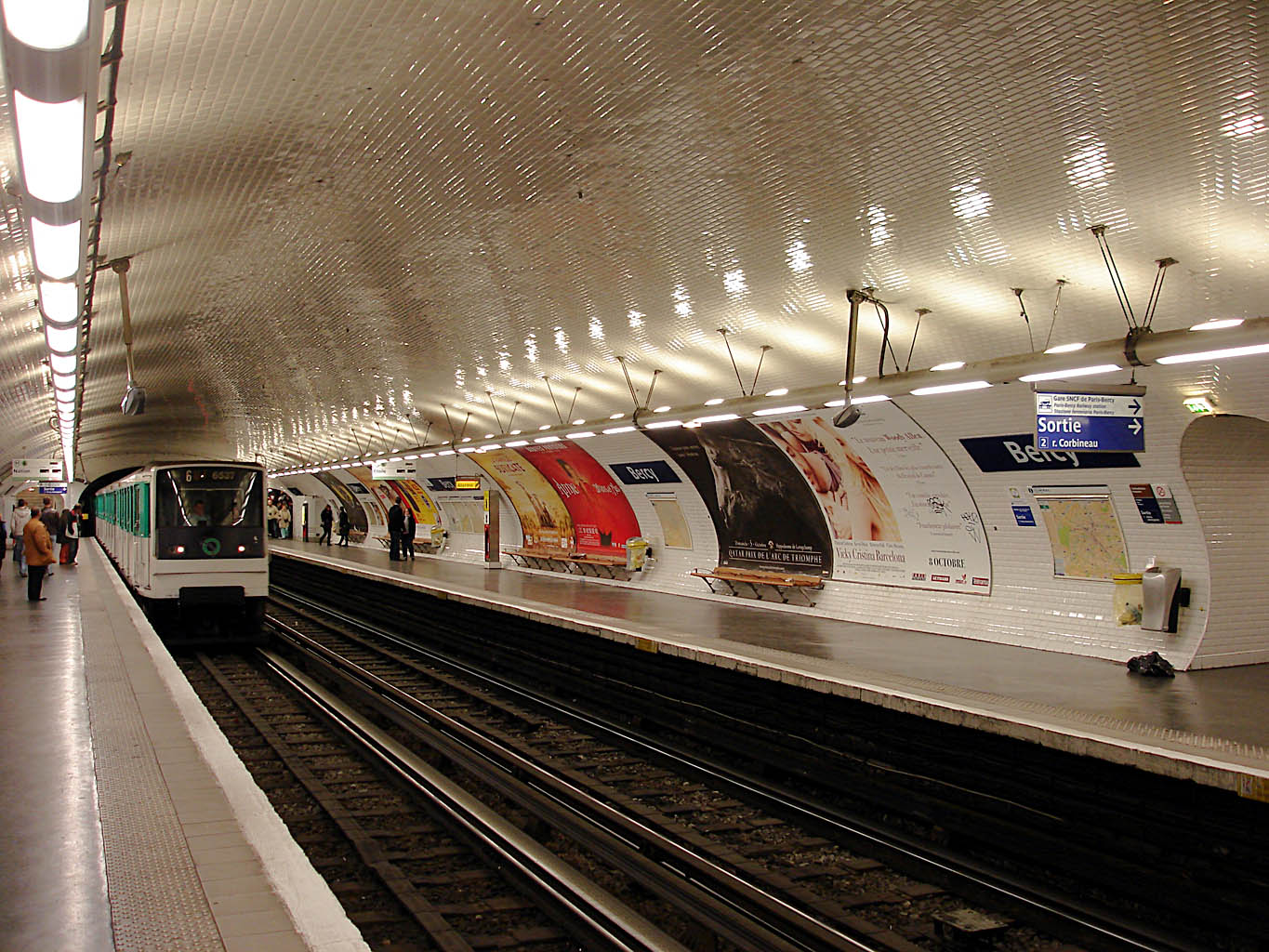
MP 73 rolling stock on Line 6 at Bercy

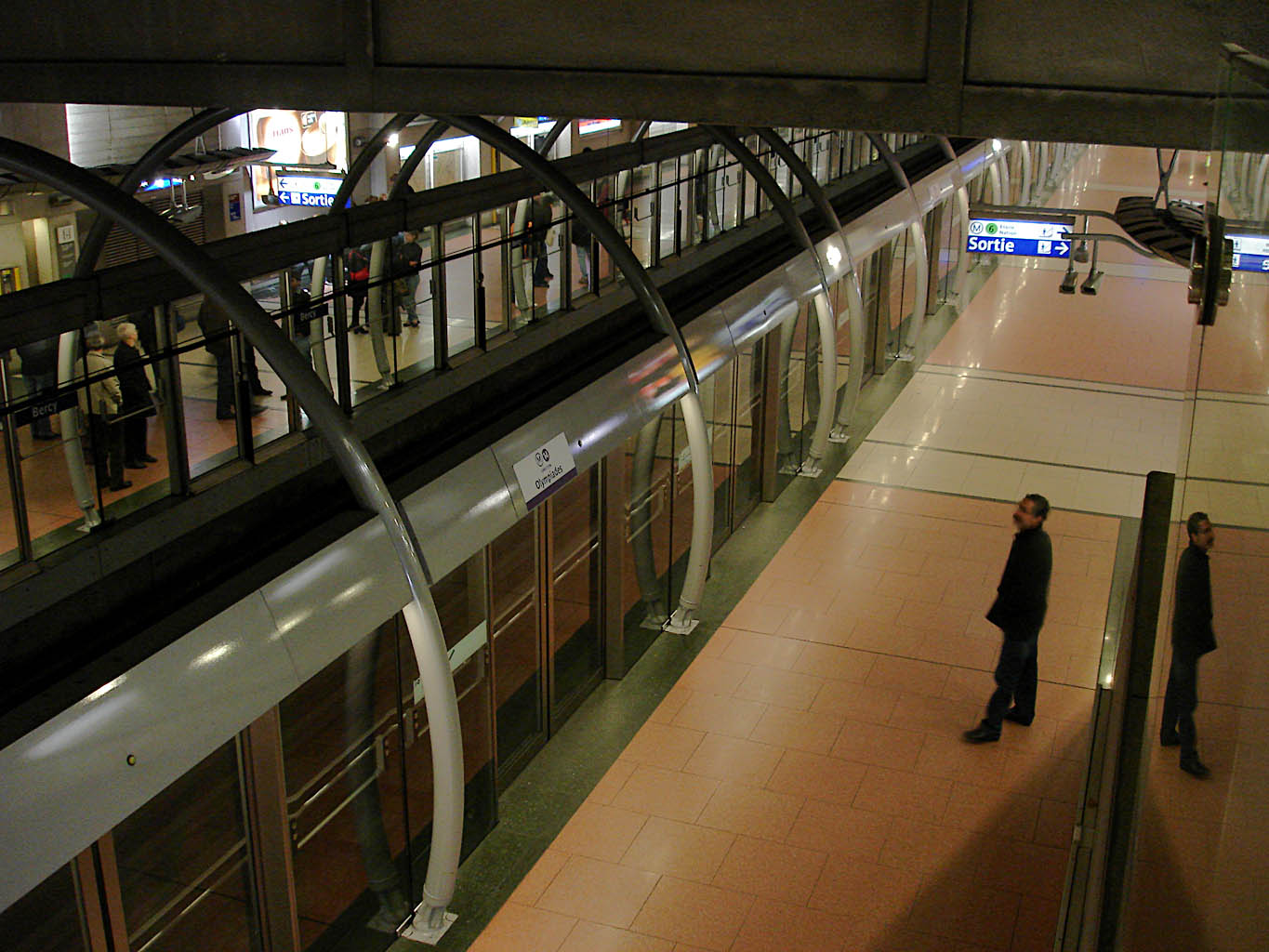
Line 14 platforms at Bercy

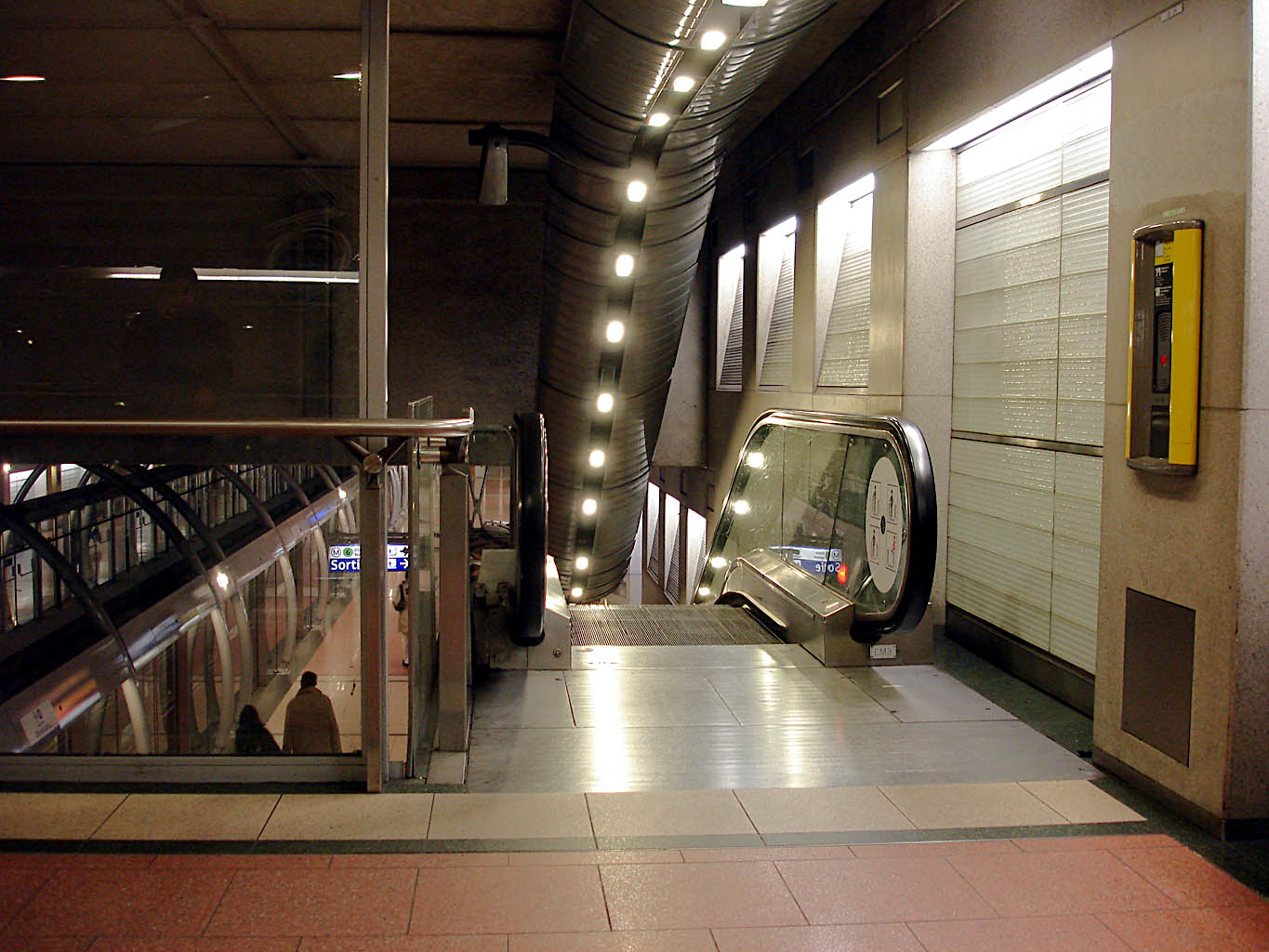
Access to Line 14 platforms

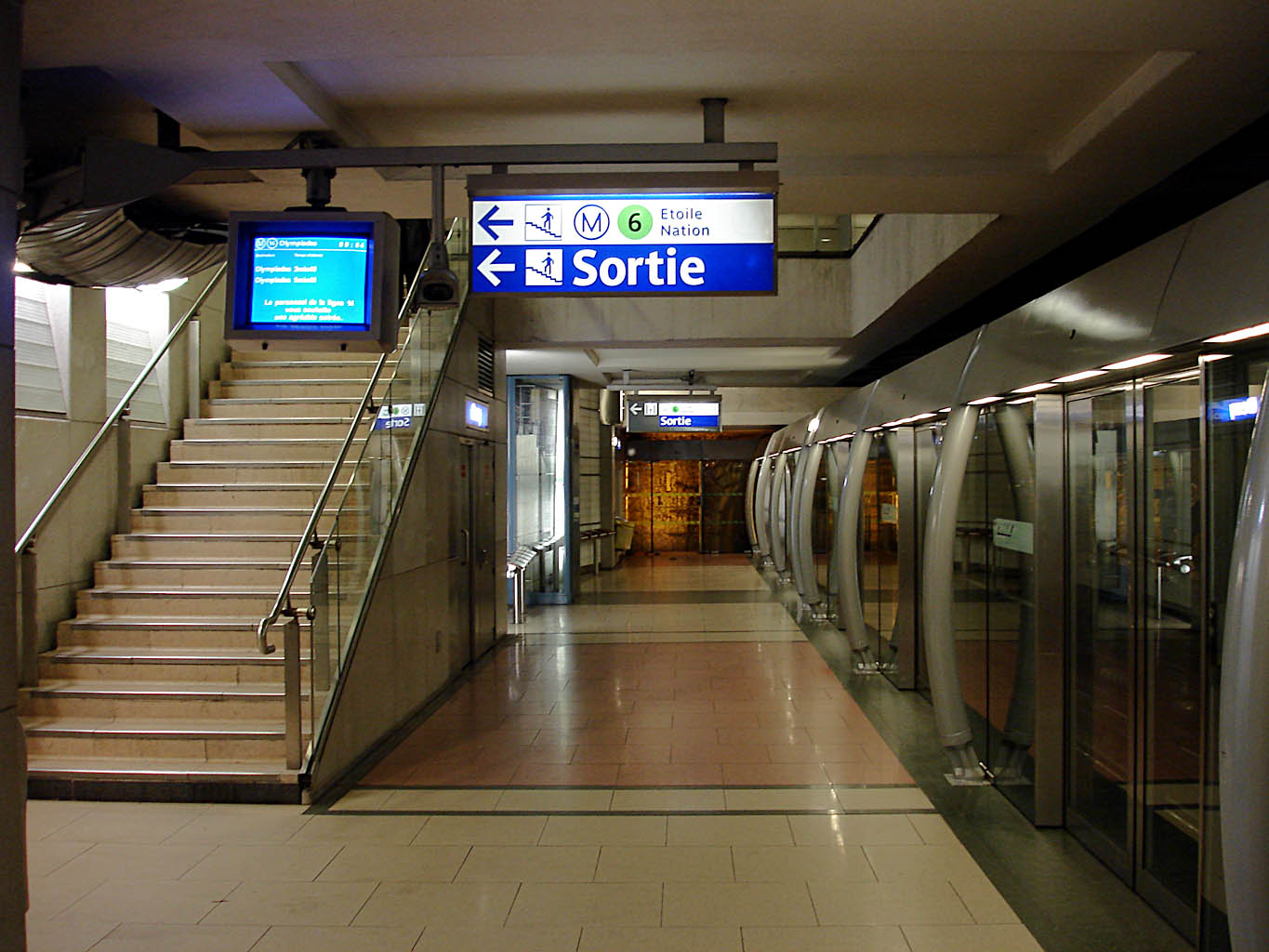
Line 14 platform (2008, view then towards Saint-Lazare)

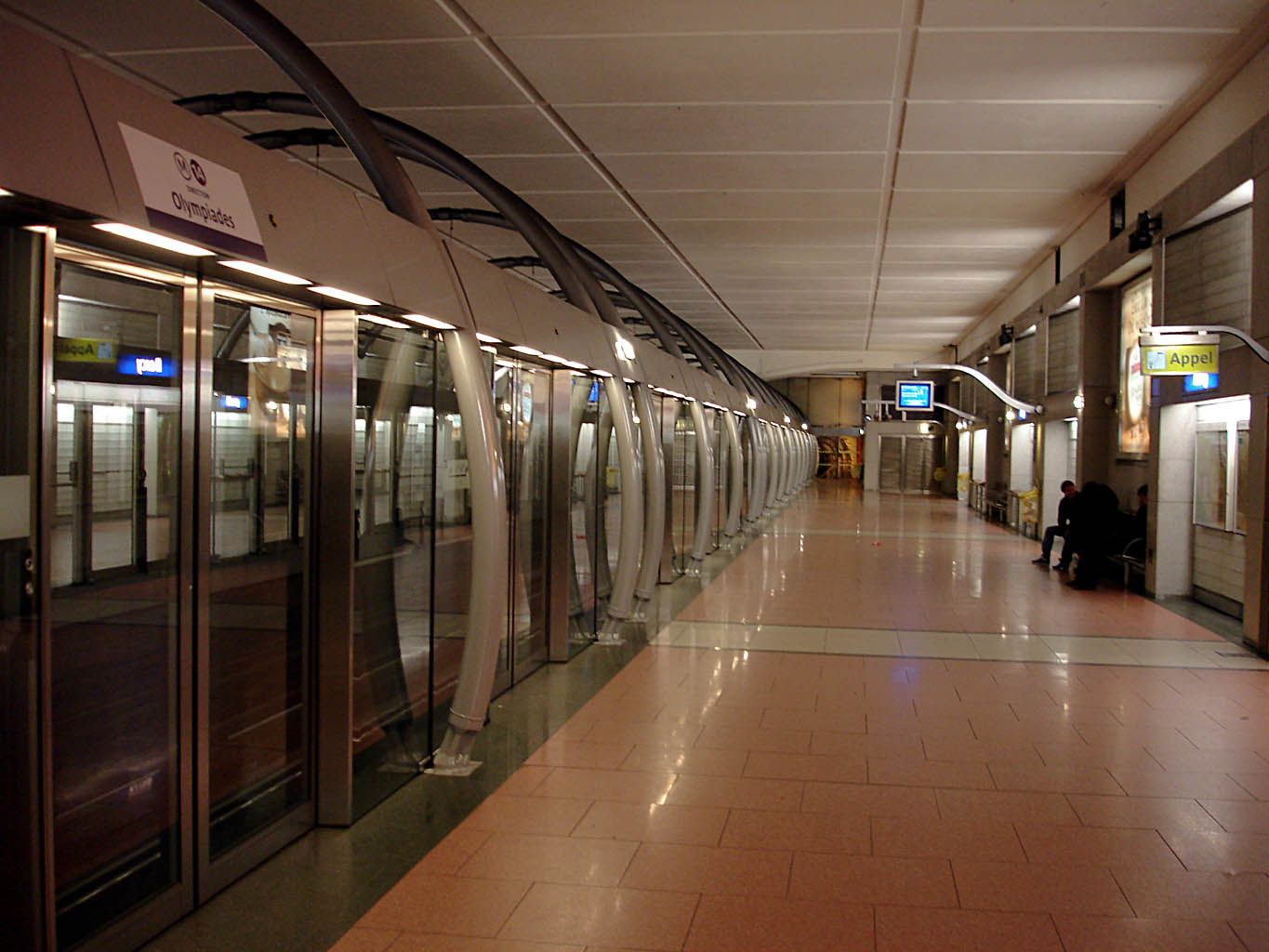
Line 14 platform (view towards Olympiades)
