= Cour Saint-Émilion station =

Metro station in Paris, France

Cour Saint-Émilion
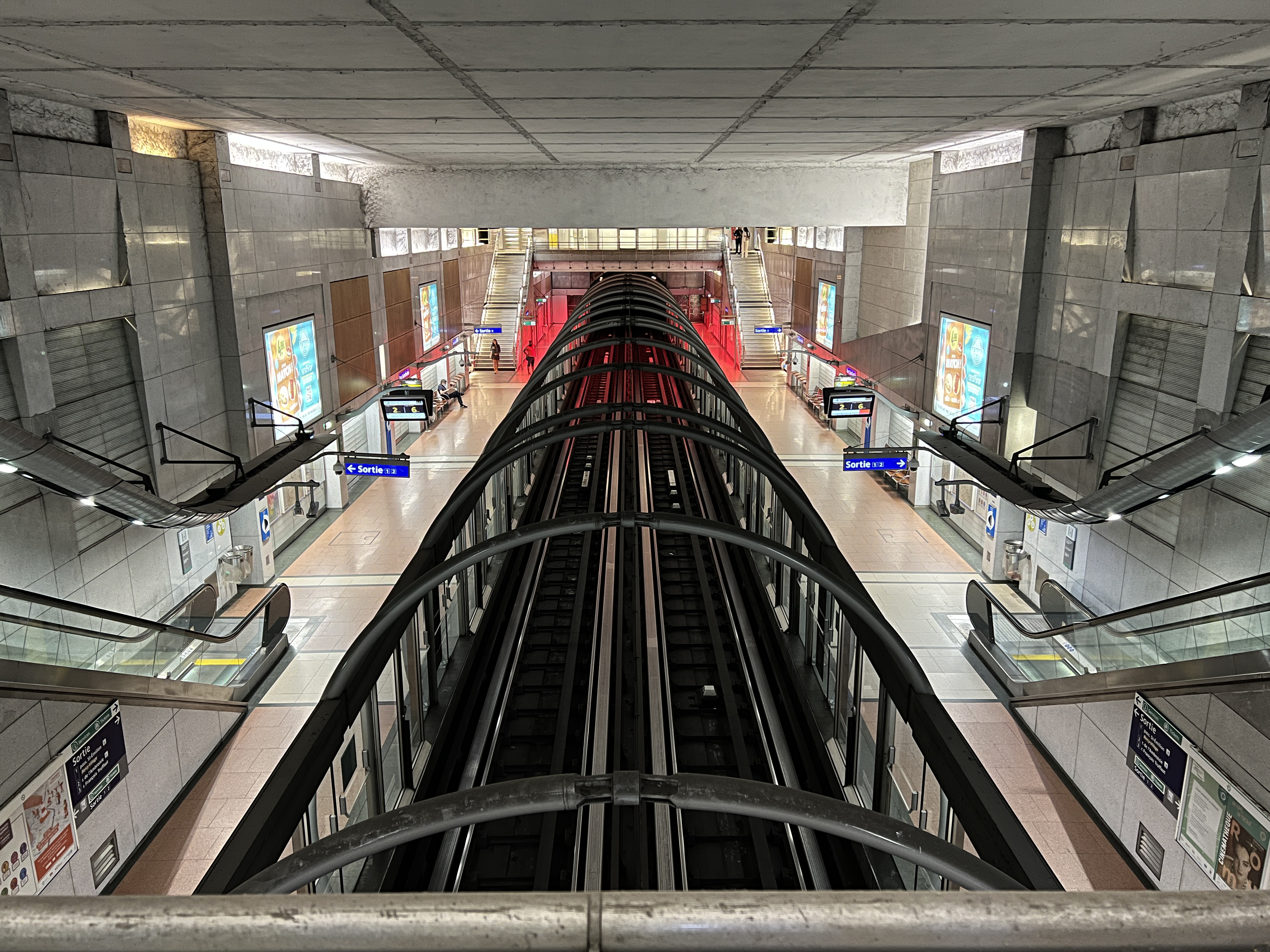
- Platforms

General information
- Location: 12th arrondissement of Paris; Île-de-France; France
- Coordinates: 48°50′02″N 2°23′10″E
- Owner: RATP
- Line: Paris Metro Paris Metro Line 14
- Platforms: 2 side platforms
- Tracks: 2

Construction
- Accessible: Yes
- Architect: Bernard Kohn

Other information
- Station code: 15-01
- Fare zone: 1

History
- Opened: 15 October 1998

Passengers
- 2,985,122 (2021)

Services
Preceding station	Paris Metro	Following station
Bercy towards Saint-Denis–Pleyel	Line 14	Bibliothèque François Mitterrand towards Aéroport d'Orly
Location
- Location within Paris

Cour Saint-Émilion station (French pronunciation: [kuʁ sɛ̃t‿emiljɔ̃]) is a station on line 14 of the Paris Métro.

It is named after the nearby Cour Saint-Émilion, a courtyard where former wine warehouses were once a major wine marketplace. The site is currently occupied by Bercy Village, a shopping centre.

The station is located at the former freight yard of Gare de Bercy, where trains that transported wine from Southern France to Paris were stored.

Initially, the station was to be named Dijon. It was then decided to name it Pommard-Saint-Émilion, after the nearby rue de Pommard and Cour Saint-Émilion. This done to not favour any of the two major French wine regions; Pommard from Burgundy and Saint-Émilion from Bordeaux, avoiding any potential further controversy between the two regions. However, the station's name was ultimately simplified to Cour Saint-Émilion, its current name.

== History ==
The station opened on 15 October 1998 as part of the initial section of line 14 between Bibliothèque François Mitterrand and Madeleine.

It was designed by Bernard Kohn, who developed the architectural guidelines for the initial section of line 14 and designed the then six intermediate stations, including Cour Saint-Émilion. Some of its features included taller ceilings, wider platforms, and the use of light concrete and wood in its design, in contrast to the other stations on the network at the time.

In October 2014, as part of the extension projects of line 14, it was planned to increase the line's capacity for more passengers from 30,000 per hour to 40,000 per hour by 2024. Besides the lengthening of the trains from six to eight cars, it was also planned to improve the accesses of the station. Two additional accesses (today accesses 2 and 3) were built. This helped redirect the flows of commuters entering and exiting the station without disrupting the flow of others at Bercy Village. This, along with five additional waiting areas were completed on 27 November 2017.

In 2019, the station was used by 6,043,808 passengers, making it the 60th busiest of the Métro network out of 302 stations.

In 2020, the station was used by 2,792,734 passengers amidst the COVID-19 pandemic, making it the 61st busiest of the Métro network out of 304 stations.

In 2021, the station was used by 2,985,122 passengers, making it the 110th busiest of the Métro network out of 304 stations.

== Passenger services ==
=== Access ===
The station has three accesses:

- Access 1: Passage Saint-Émilion Bercy-Village (with escalators)
- Access 2: rue de l'Ambroisie Parc de Bercy (with an elevator)
- Access 3: rue François Truffaut (with an ascending escalator)

=== Station layout ===
G	Street Level	Exit/Entrance
B1	Mezzanine	to Exits/Entrances
B2	Side platform with PSDs, doors will open on the right
B2	Northbound	← toward Saint-Denis–Pleyel (Bercy)
B2	Southbound	toward Aéroport d'Orly (Bibliothèque François Mitterrand) →
B2	Side platform with PSDs, doors will open on the right

=== Platforms ===
The station is of a standard configuration with two tracks surrounded by two side platforms.

=== Other connections ===
The station is also served by a number of bus routes along various nearby bus stops.

- RATP bus network: 24, 64, 109, 111
- Noctilien bus network: N32, N130

== Nearby ==
- Bercy Village
- Musée des Arts Forains
- Parc de Bercy

== Gallery ==
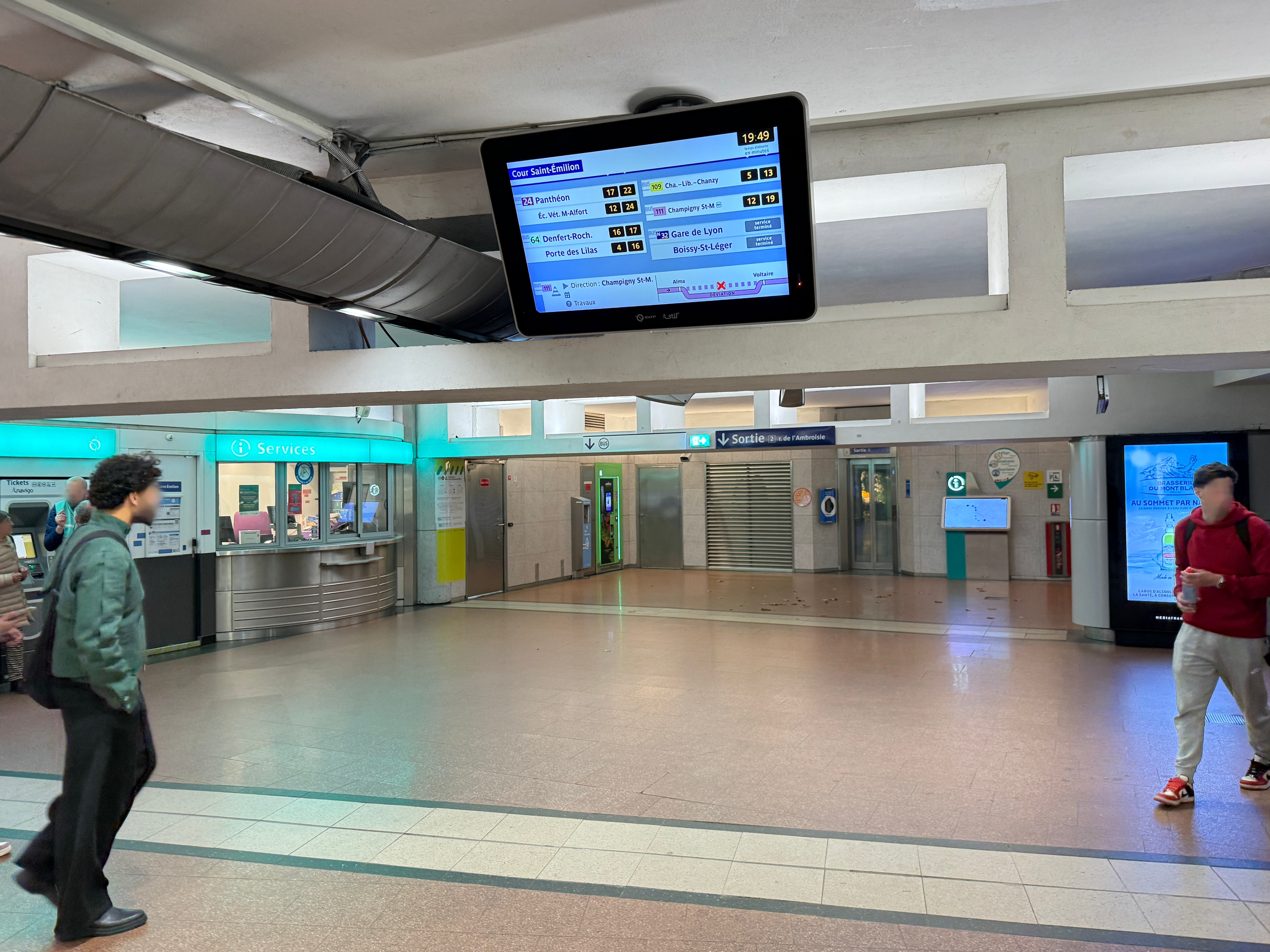
Mezzanine

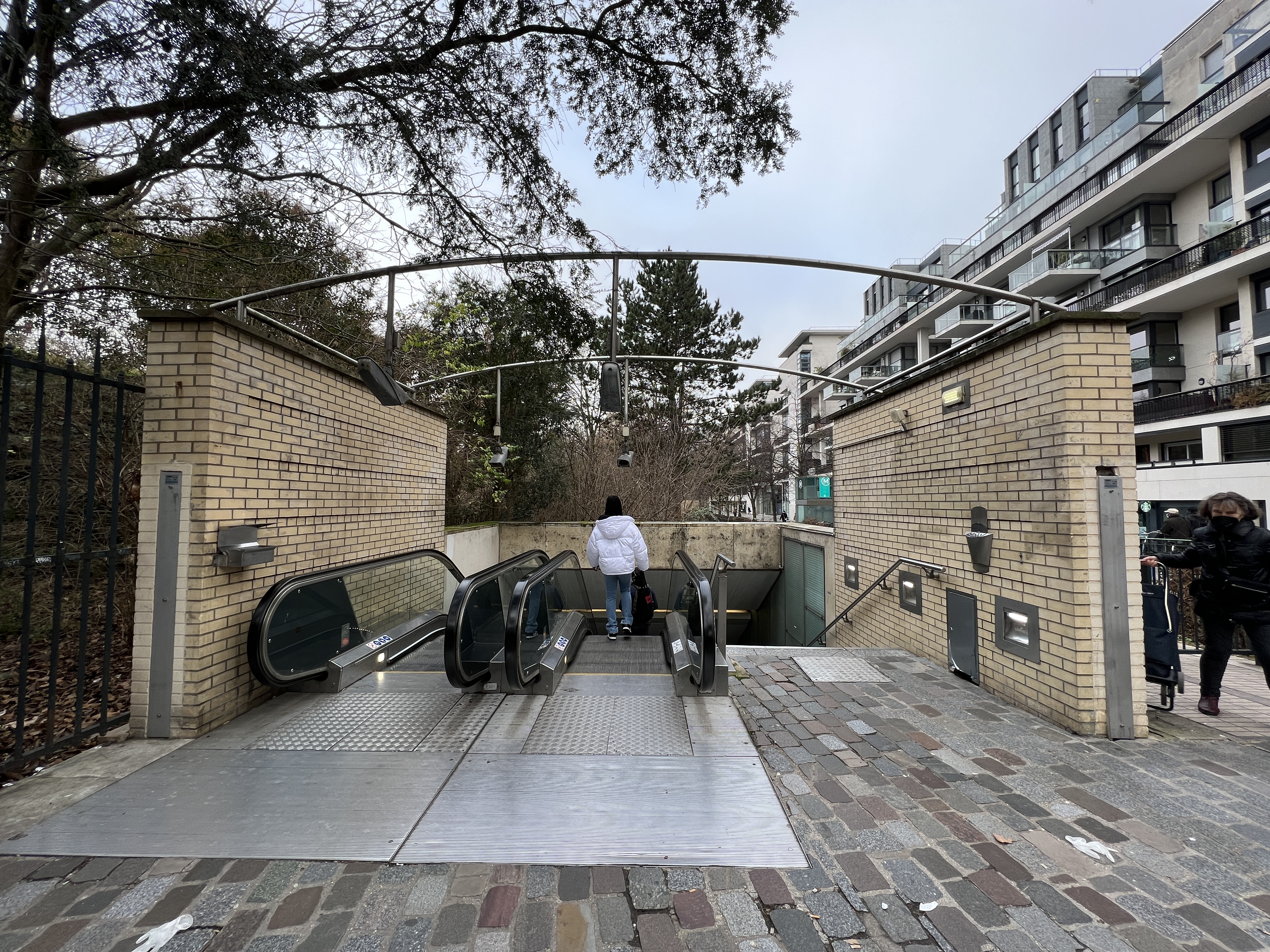
Access 1

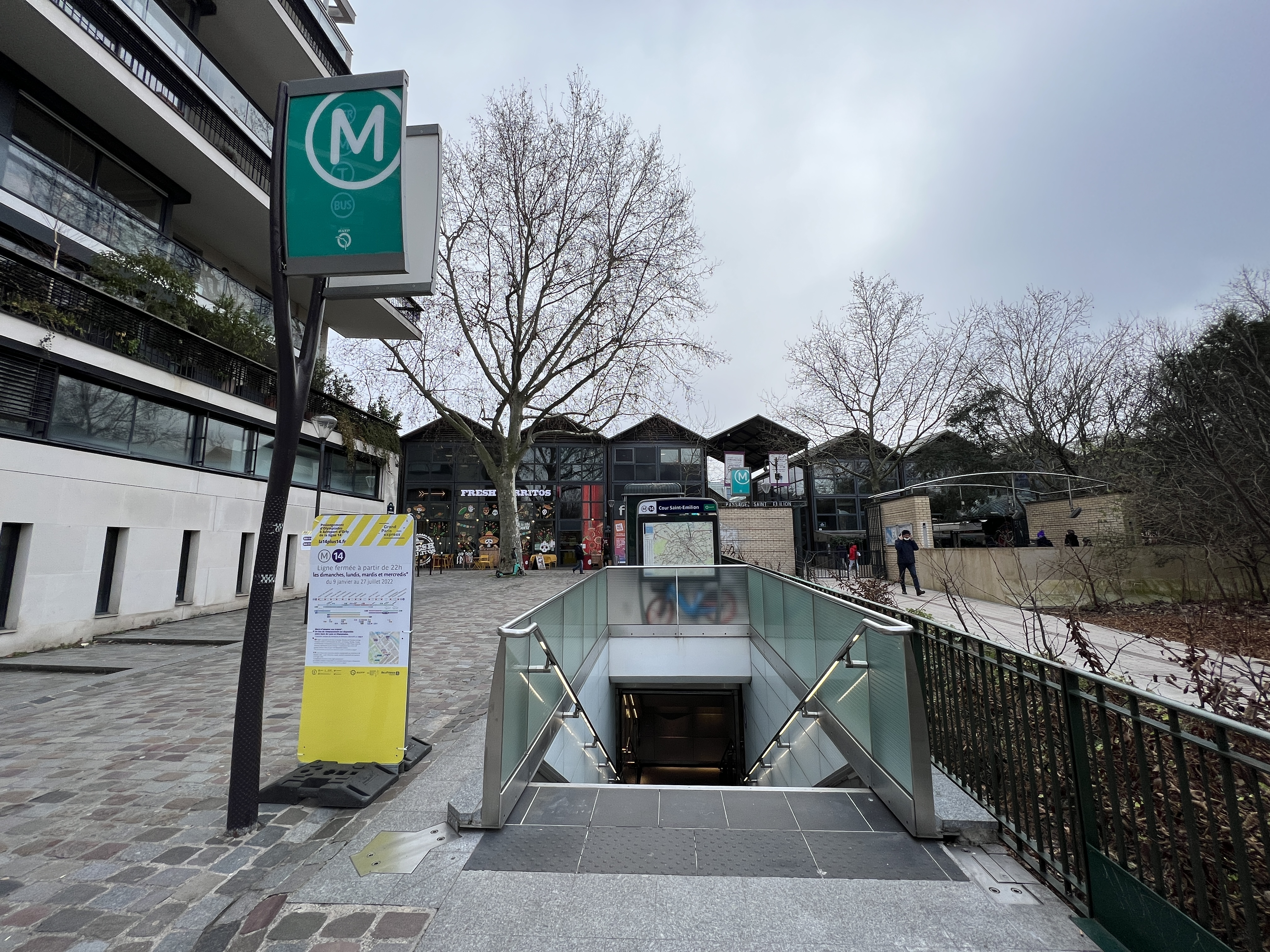
Access 2

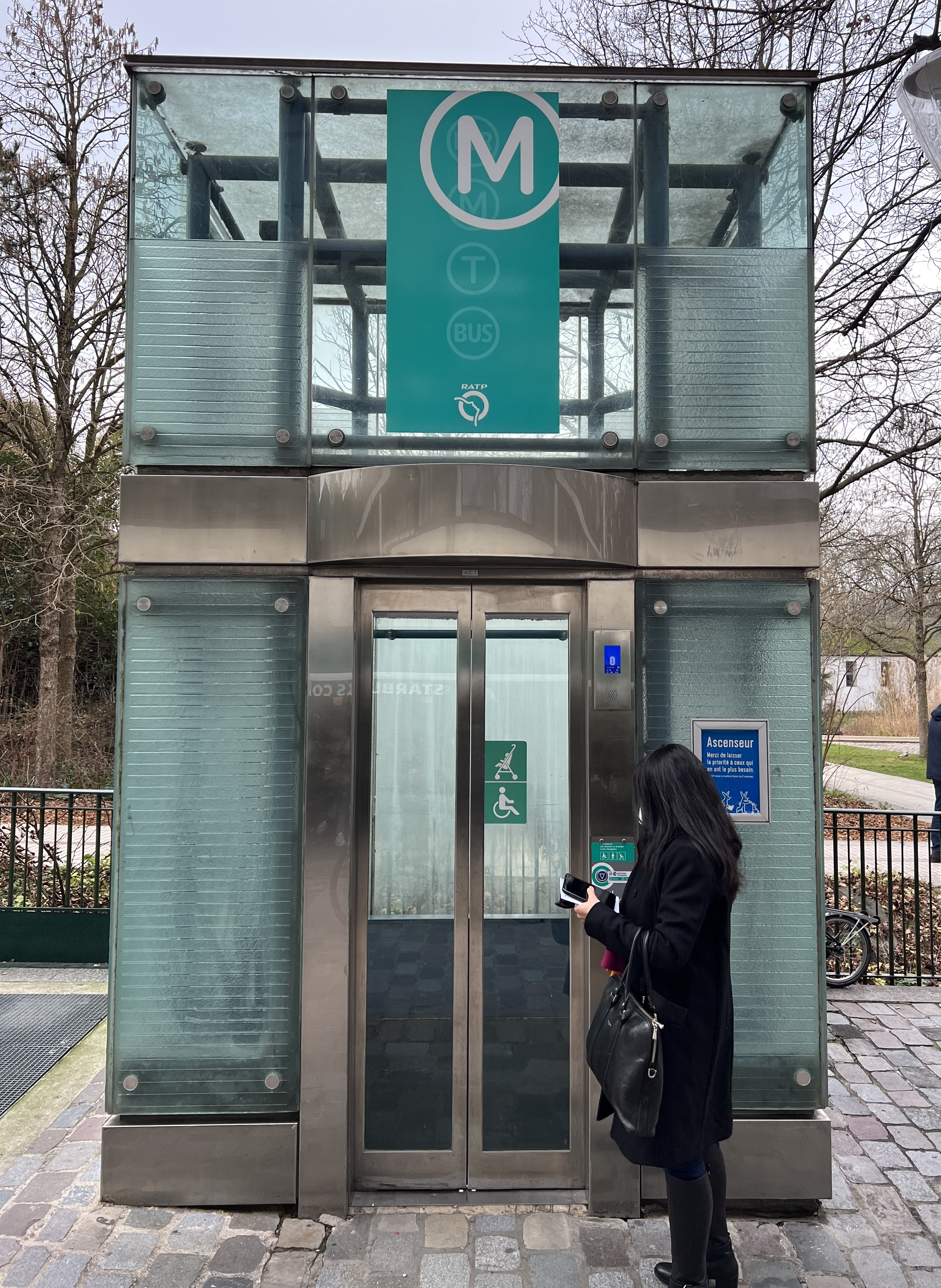
Elevator at access 2

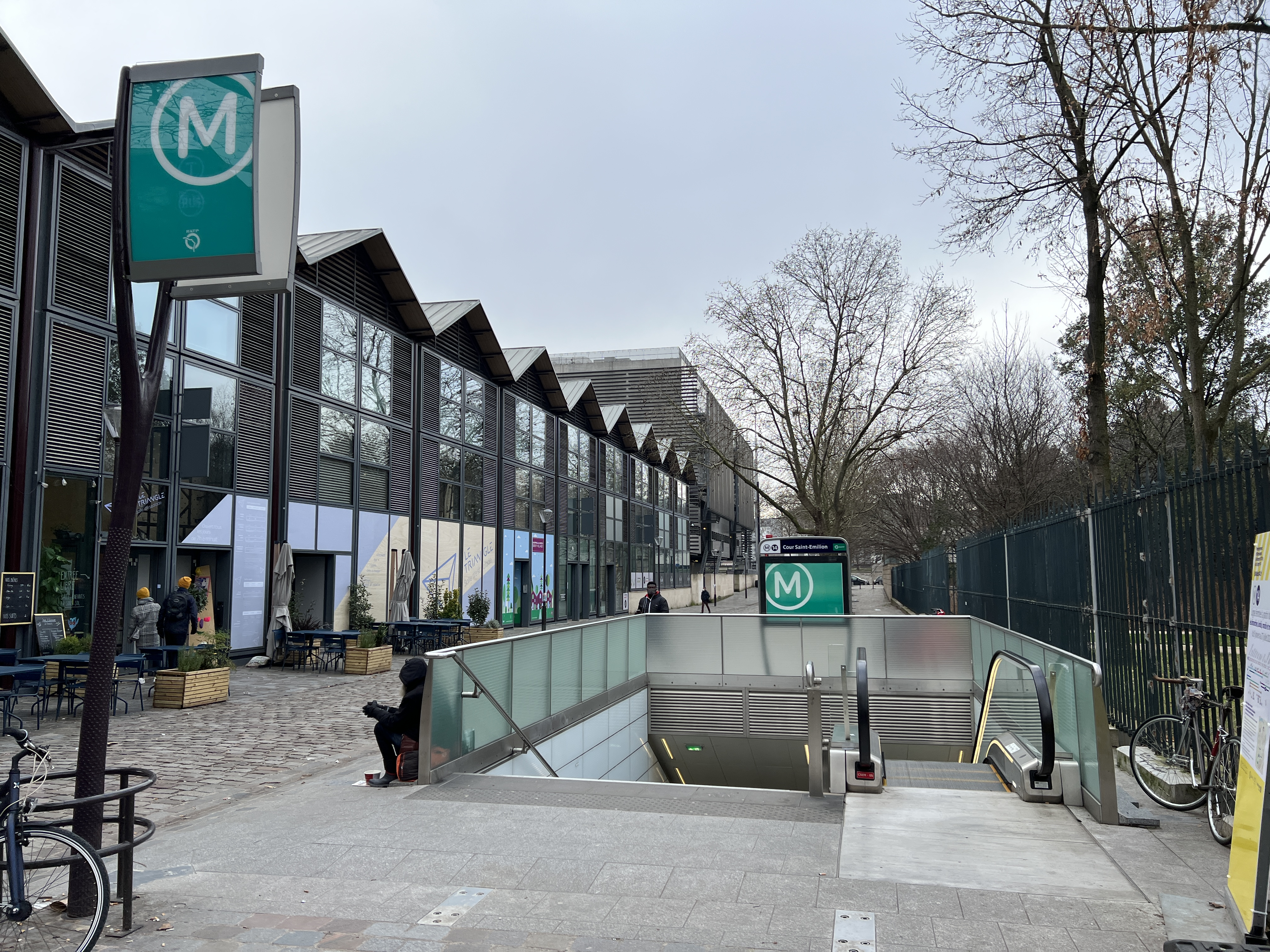
Access 3
