= Gare de Paris Bercy =

Terminal railway station in Paris, France

Paris Bercy Bourgogne–Pays d'Auvergne
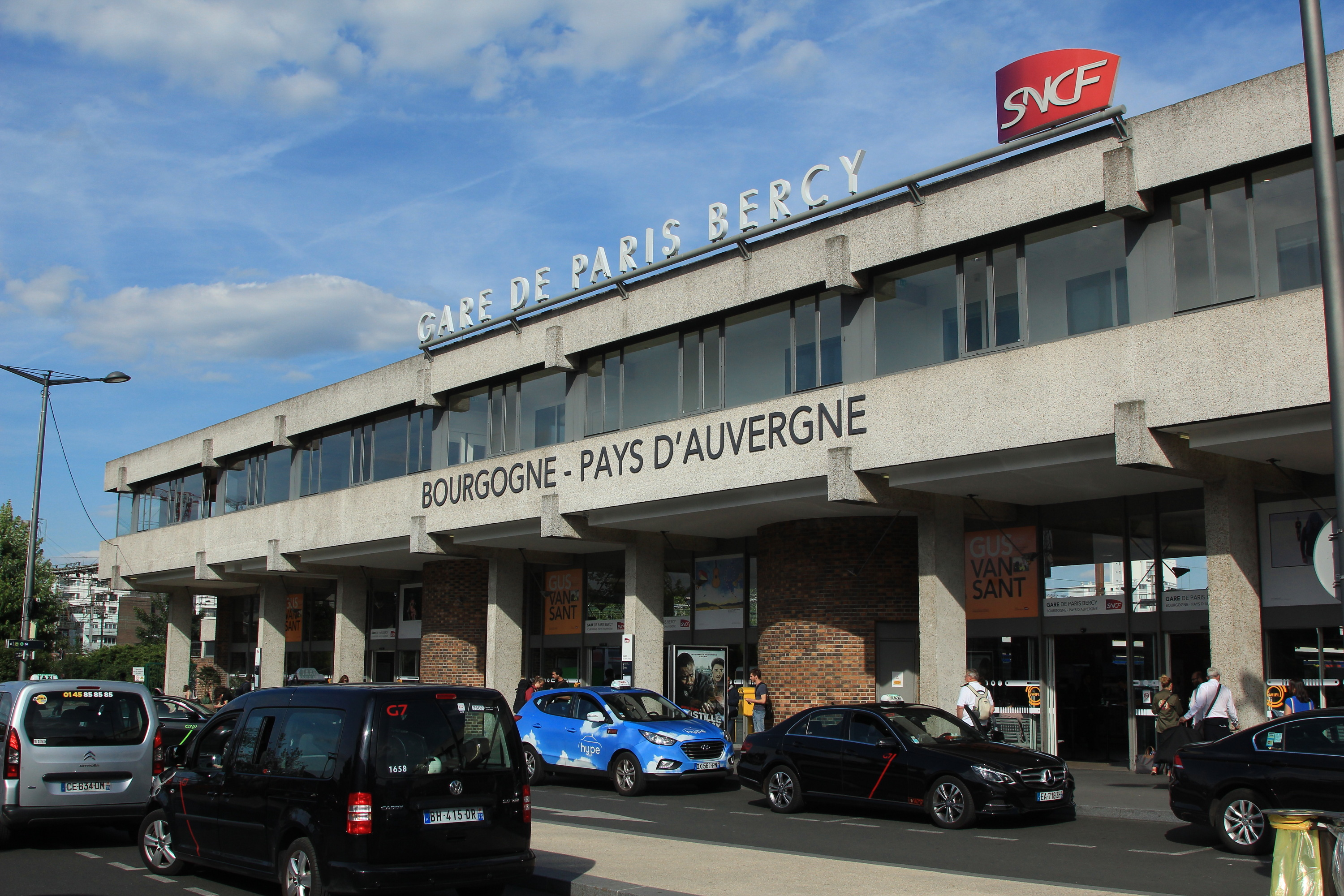
- Exterior of station

General information
- Location: 48 bis Boulevard de Bercy; Paris; France
- Coordinates: 48°50′21″N 2°22′59″E
- Owner: SNCF
- Line: Paris–Marseille railway
- Tracks: 6 + car loading tracks
- Connections: RATP Bus: 24 71 87 215; Noctilien: N32 N35

Construction
- Structure type: Embankment
- Parking: Yes
- Cycle facilities: Racks

Other information
- Station code: 87686667

History
- Opened: 1977

Passengers
- 2024: 5,504,359

Services
Preceding station	SNCF	Following station
Terminus	Intercités	Nemours – Saint-Pierre towards Nevers
Terminus	Intercités	Nevers towards Clermont-Ferrand
Preceding station	Ouigo	Following station
Terminus	Train Classique	Villeneuve-Saint-Georges towards Lyon-Perrache
Preceding station	TER Bourgogne-Franche-Comté	Following station
Terminus	TER	Sens towards Dijon
Terminus	TER	Montereau towards Avallon

Connections to other stations
Preceding station	Paris Metro	Following station
Quai de la Gare towards Charles de Gaulle–Étoile	Line 6 transfer at Bercy	Dugommier towards Nation
Gare de Lyon towards Saint-Denis–Pleyel	Line 14 transfer at Bercy	Cour Saint-Émilion towards Aéroport d'Orly
Location

Gare de Paris Bercy, officially Gare de Paris Bercy Bourgogne – Pays d'Auvergne, is one of the seven mainline railway station terminals in Paris. It handles about 4.3 million passengers annually according to the estimates of the SNCF, making it the least busy mainline station in Paris.

The station is located in the 12th arrondissement, on the right bank of the river Seine, in the east of Paris. It is located a short distance from Gare de Lyon and serves as an annex of the larger station, helping to relieve the traffic in the busy station. The station is on the Paris–Marseille railway and hosts Intercités long-distance trains and TER Bourgogne-Franche-Comté regional trains. Trains depart from six tracks labeled with letters from P to V (tracks A to L are located inside Gare de Lyon).

The station is named after the Bercy neighborhood where it is located, and the subtitle name refers to the Bourgogne (English: Burgundy) and Auvergne regions that are served by trains departing from this station. The station is close to the Bercy Arena, a short distance from the Gare de Bercy–Seine intercity bus terminal, and offers connections to Line 6 and Line 14 of the Paris Métro at the Bercy Métro station.

== History ==
Opened in 1977, the station was designed to specialise in auto-trains which transport travellers along with their vehicles. The service, typically operating overnight, were also known as "train auto-couchettes" (TAC) because passengers rode in couchette-style sleeping cars. Auto-train services were operated between Paris Bercy to Avignon-Sud, Marseille-Saint-Charles, Toulon, Fréjus-Saint-Raphaël and Nice-Ville stations.

Starting in 2012, trains from Intercités long-distance trains and TER Bourgogne-Franche-Comté regional trains between Paris and the Bourgogne (English: Burgundy) and Auvergne regions were redirected from Gare de Lyon to Gare de Bercy to reduce the crowding at the larger station. The move was controversial and was protested by the president of the regional council of Auvergne who pointed out in a letter to SNCF that Gare de Bercy had fewer services and was less comfortable than Gare de Lyon. Users of the trains asked Conseil d'État to intervene and move services back but the appeal was rejected in March 2014 with the council siding with SNCF's concerns about crowding at Gare de Lyon.

After it was clear that the service was being shifted to Gare de Bercy for good, each of the regions had asked to have the station renamed after them (Gare de Bourgogne or Gare d'Auvergne), similar to how Gare de Lyon is named after the Lyon region. The 12th arrondissement of Paris (which was historically known as Bercy) opposed the change. In an effort to ease tensions, the SNCF agreed in September 2016 to use all of the names, renaming the station Gare de Paris Bercy Bourgogne – Pays d'Auvergne.

In October 2013, the esplanade in front of the station was renovated, adding the "Jardin des terroirs" (English: Garden of terroirs) that serves as both a neighbourhood park and an outdoor waiting area for passengers.

The station served as a hub for the SNCF's iDBUS/Ouibus international bus service between July 2012 and January 2019.

Starting in December 2018, the passenger cars were removed from the auto-train service (so trains only consist of specialised autoracks) forcing passengers to purchase a ticket on a passenger train if they want to accompany their car to a destination. The SNCF discontinued the auto-train in December 2019, saying that they no longer made money.

== Train services ==
The following services currently call at Paris-Bercy:

- intercity services (Intercités) Paris – Montargis – Nevers
- intercity services (Intercités) Paris – Nevers – Clermont-Ferrand
- local service (TER Bourgogne-Franche-Comté) Paris – Sens – Laroche-Migennes – Montbard – Dijon (- Lyon)
- local service (TER Bourgogne-Franche-Comté) Paris – Sens – Laroche-Migennes – Auxerre – Corbigny/Avallon

== Photo gallery ==
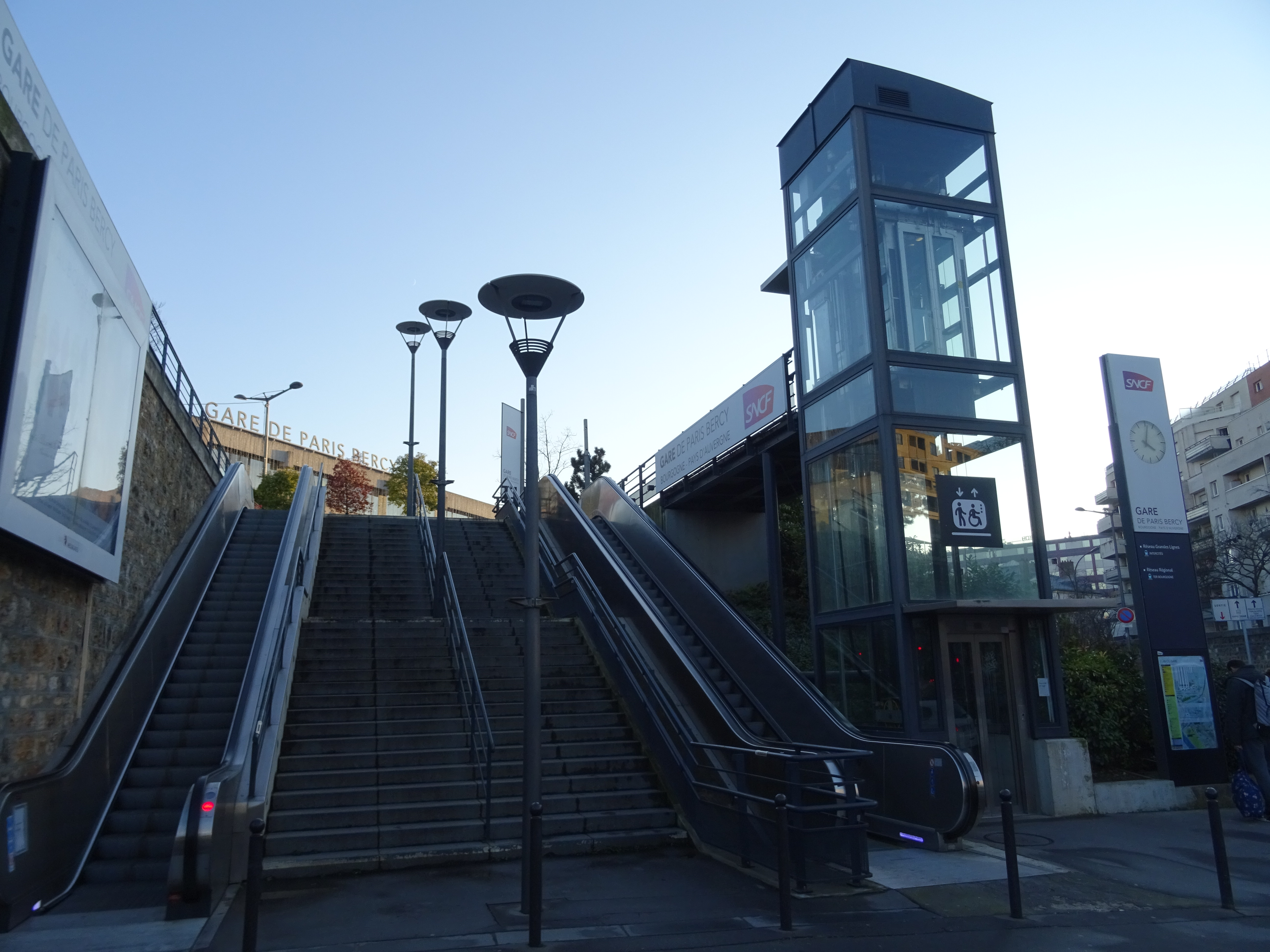
Stairs and lift from the Boulevard de Bercy to the station

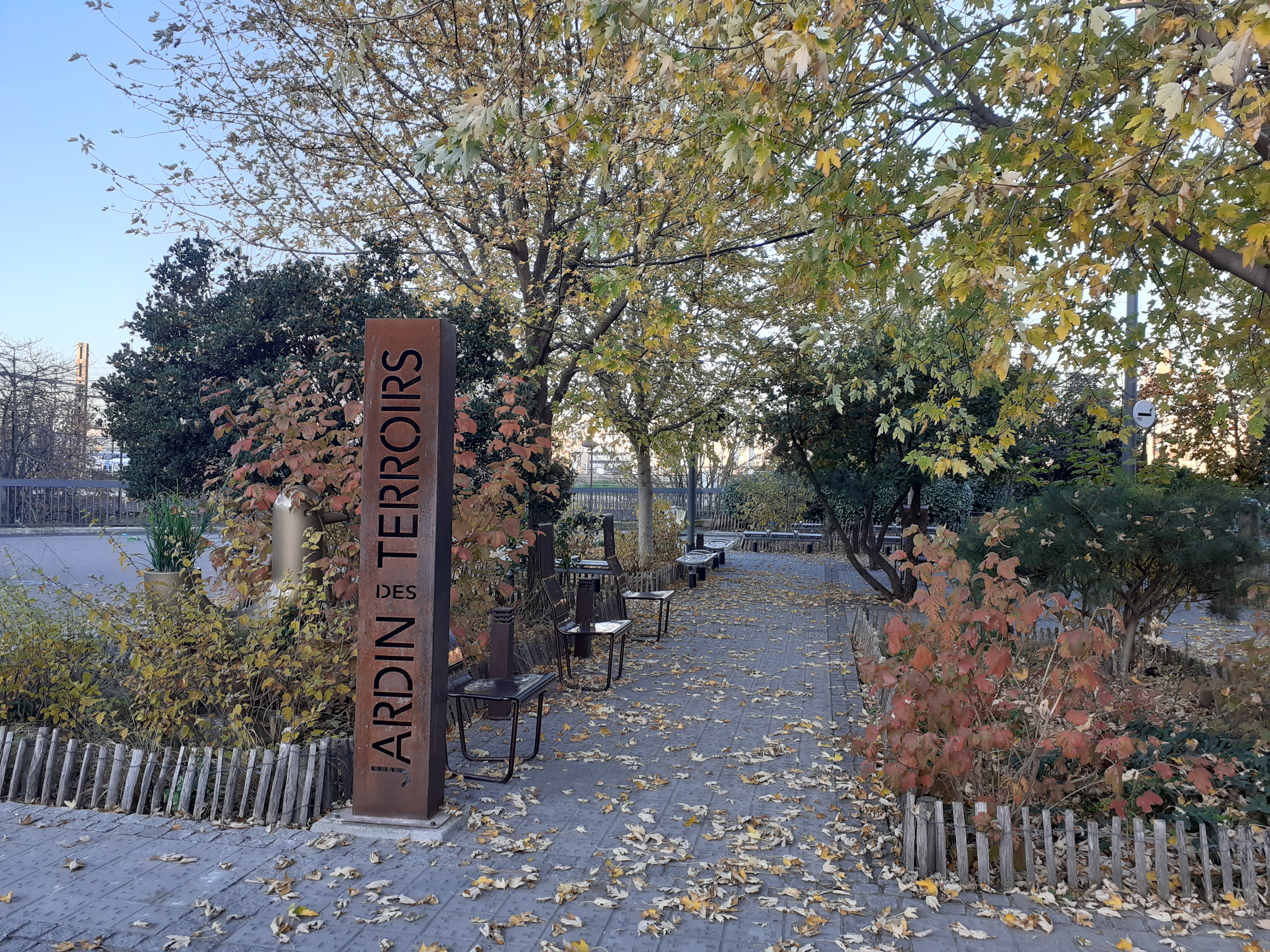
"Jardin des terroirs" (English: Garden of terroirs) in front of the station

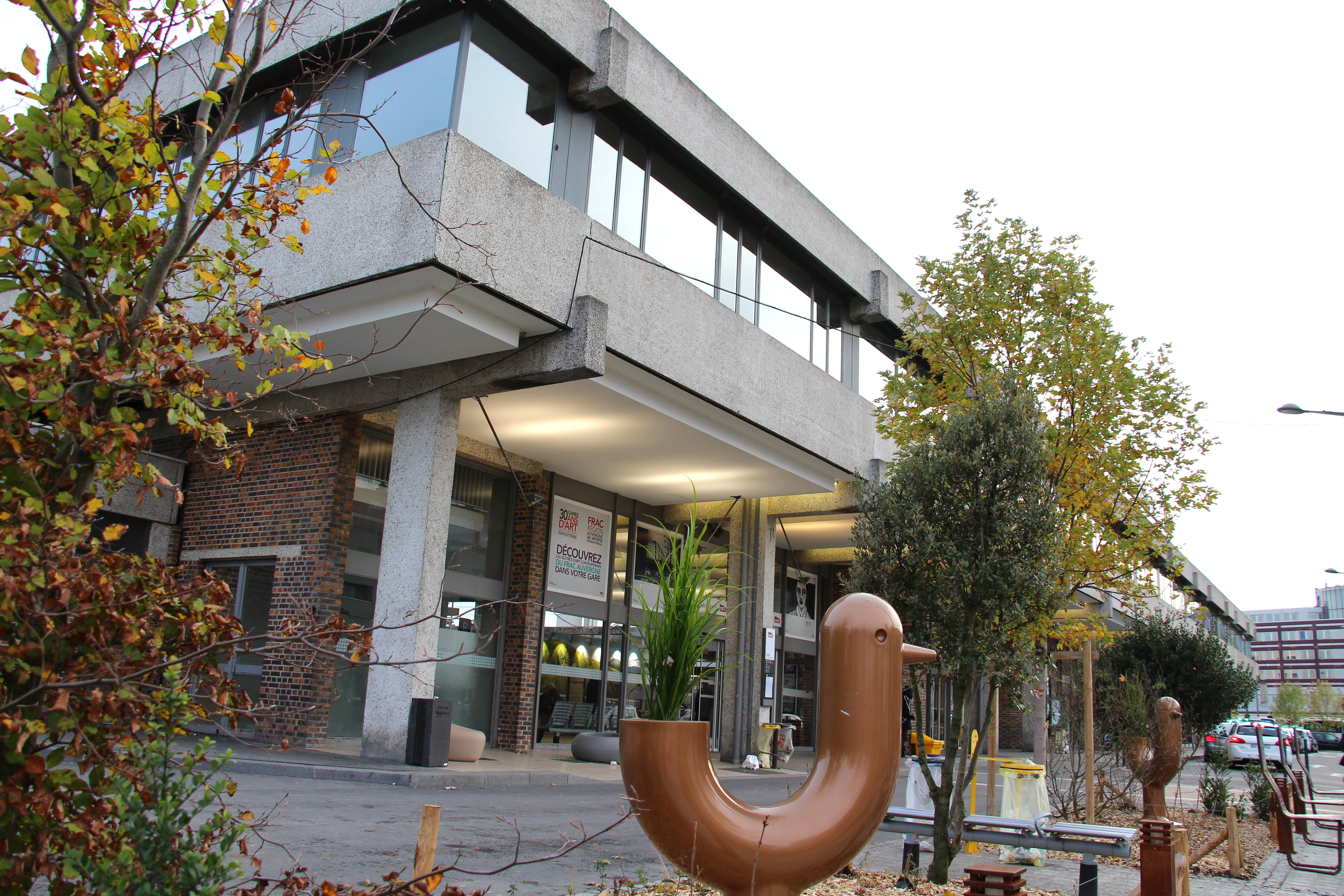
Sculpture in "jardin des terroirs"

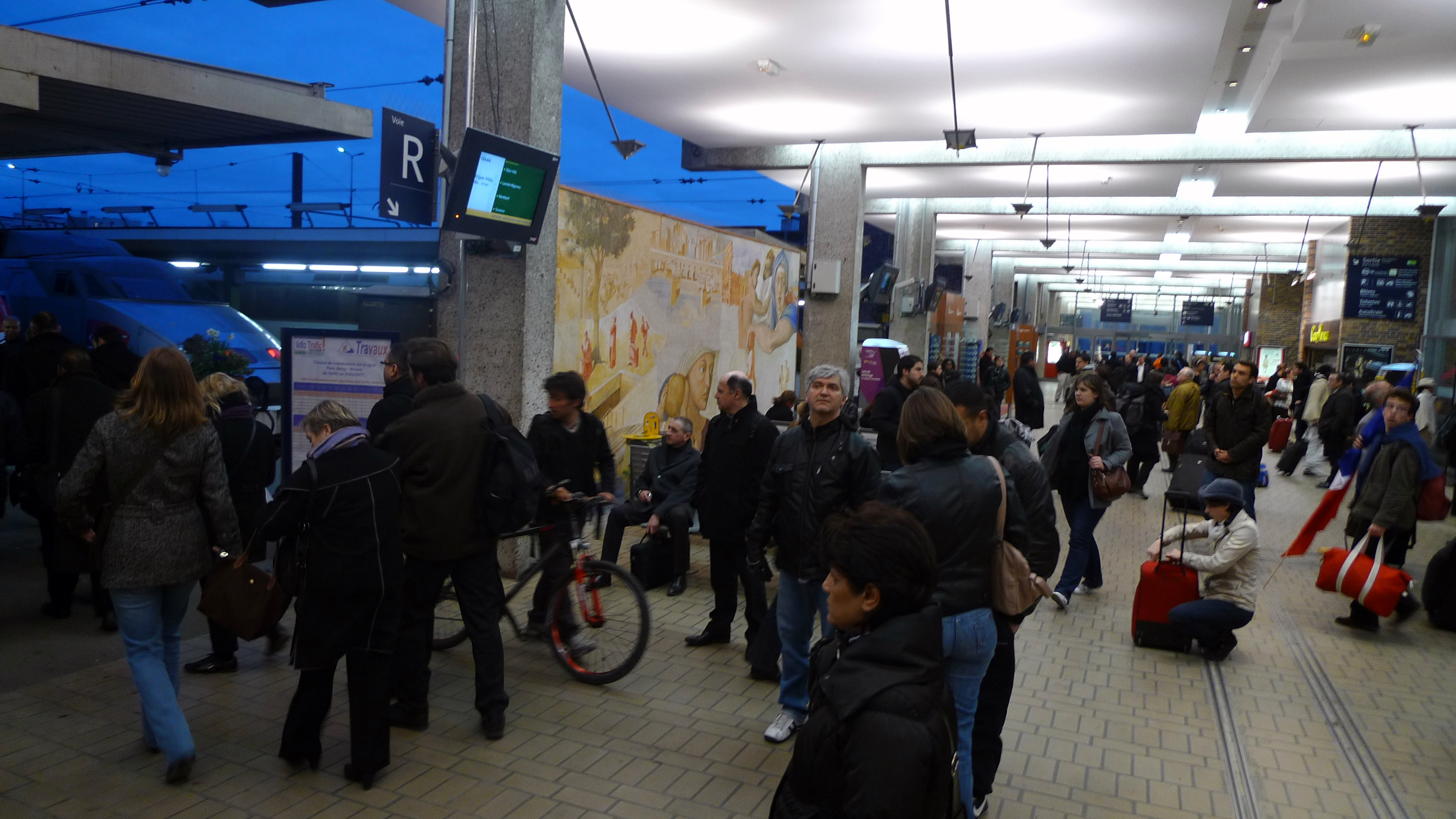
Station concourse

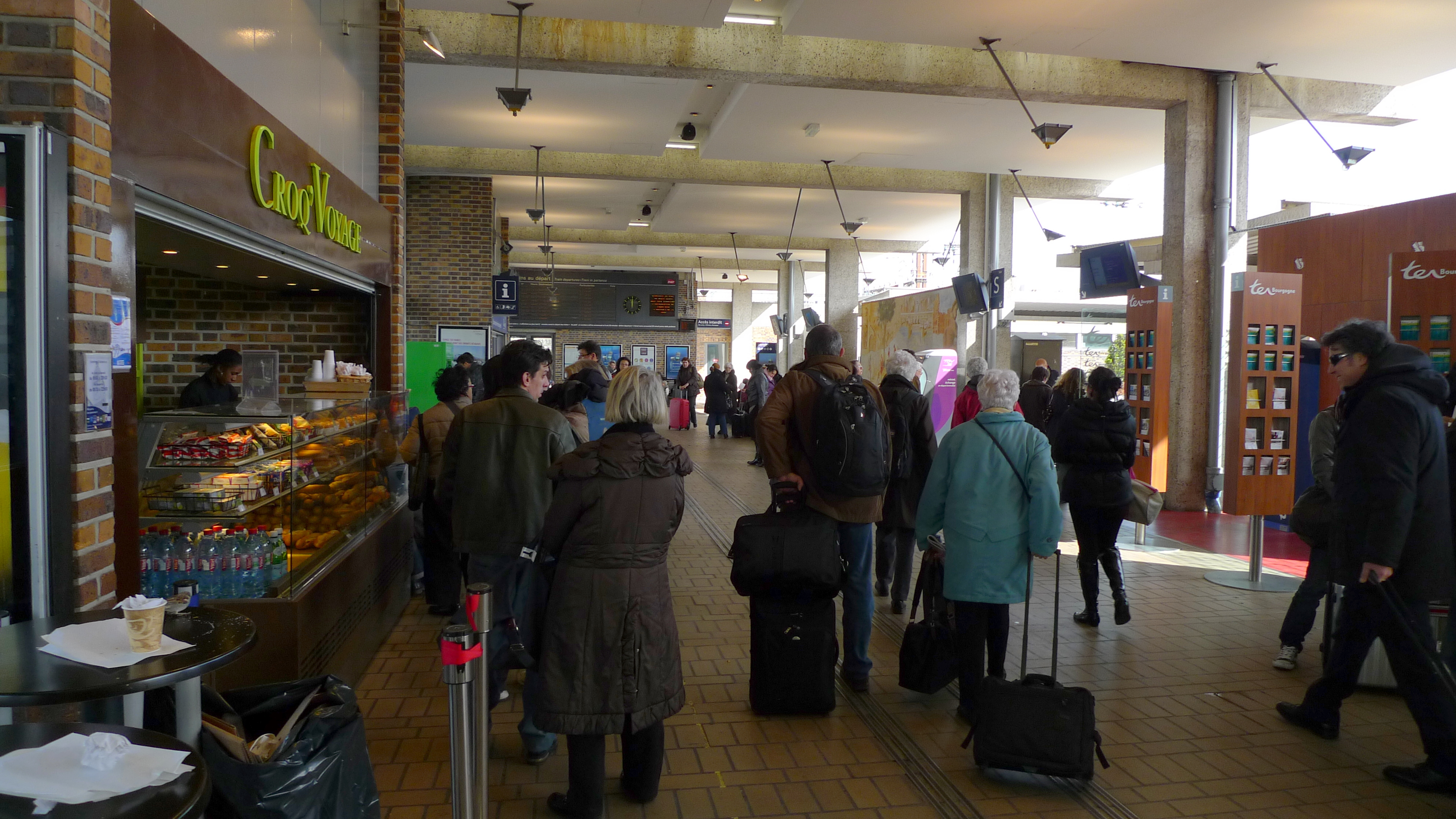
Station concourse and restaurant

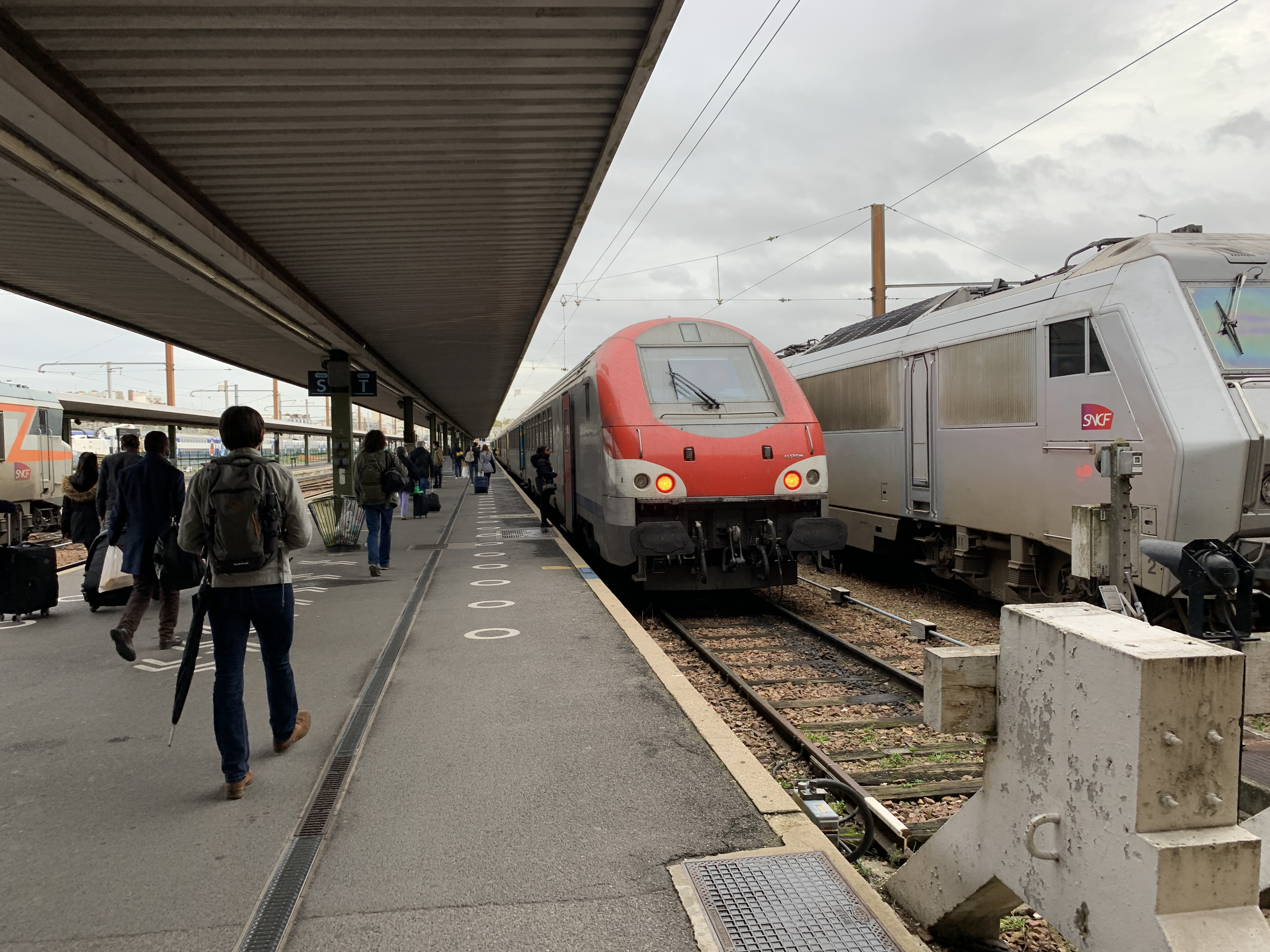
Platforms

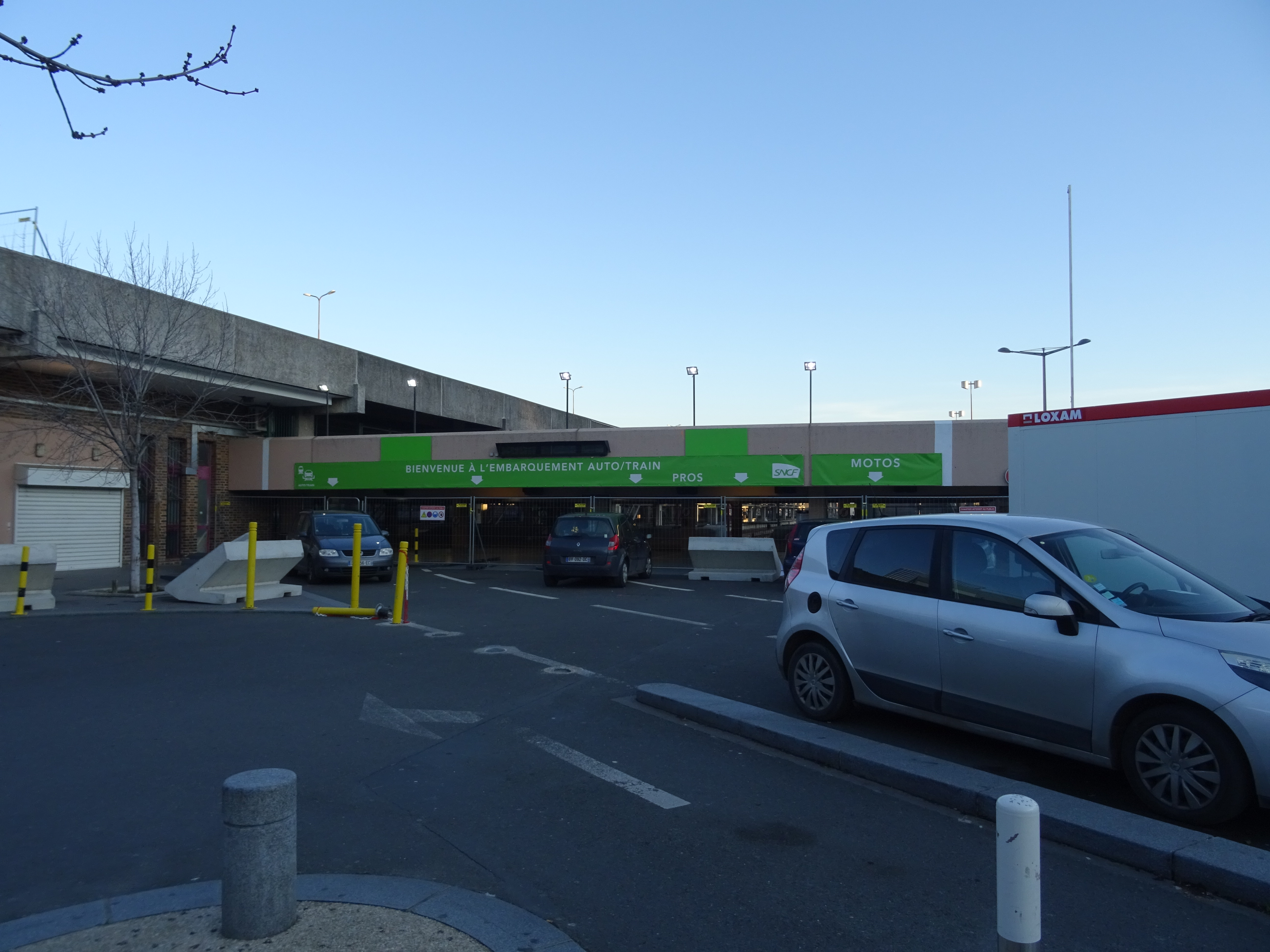
Former entrance to auto-train loading area

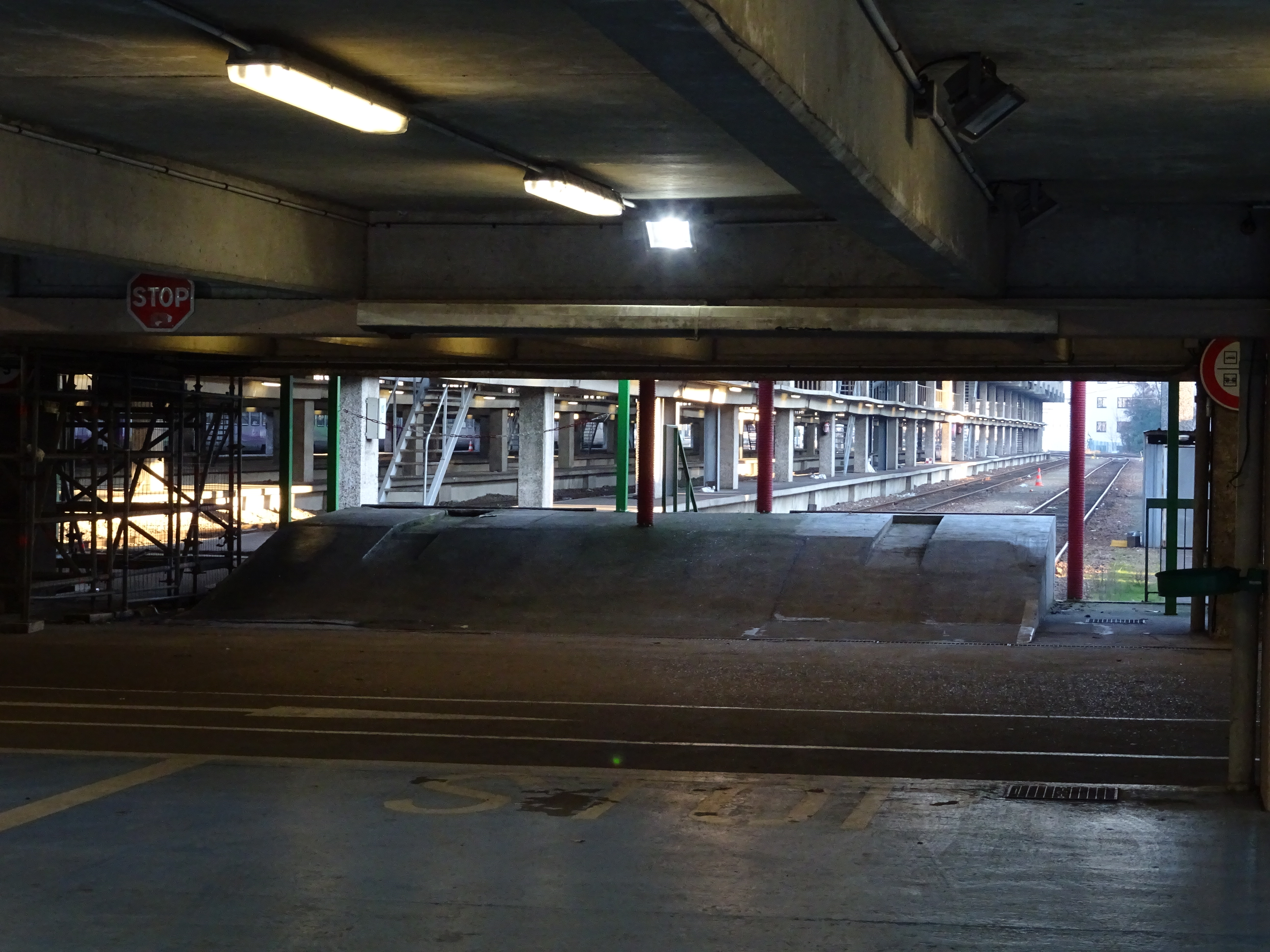
Now disused ramps to load vehicles onto autoracks

== See also ==
- List of Paris railway stations
- Wine warehouses of Bercy
