= Paris Metro Line 14 =

Rapid transit line in Paris, France

Line 14
- Paris Metro Line 14
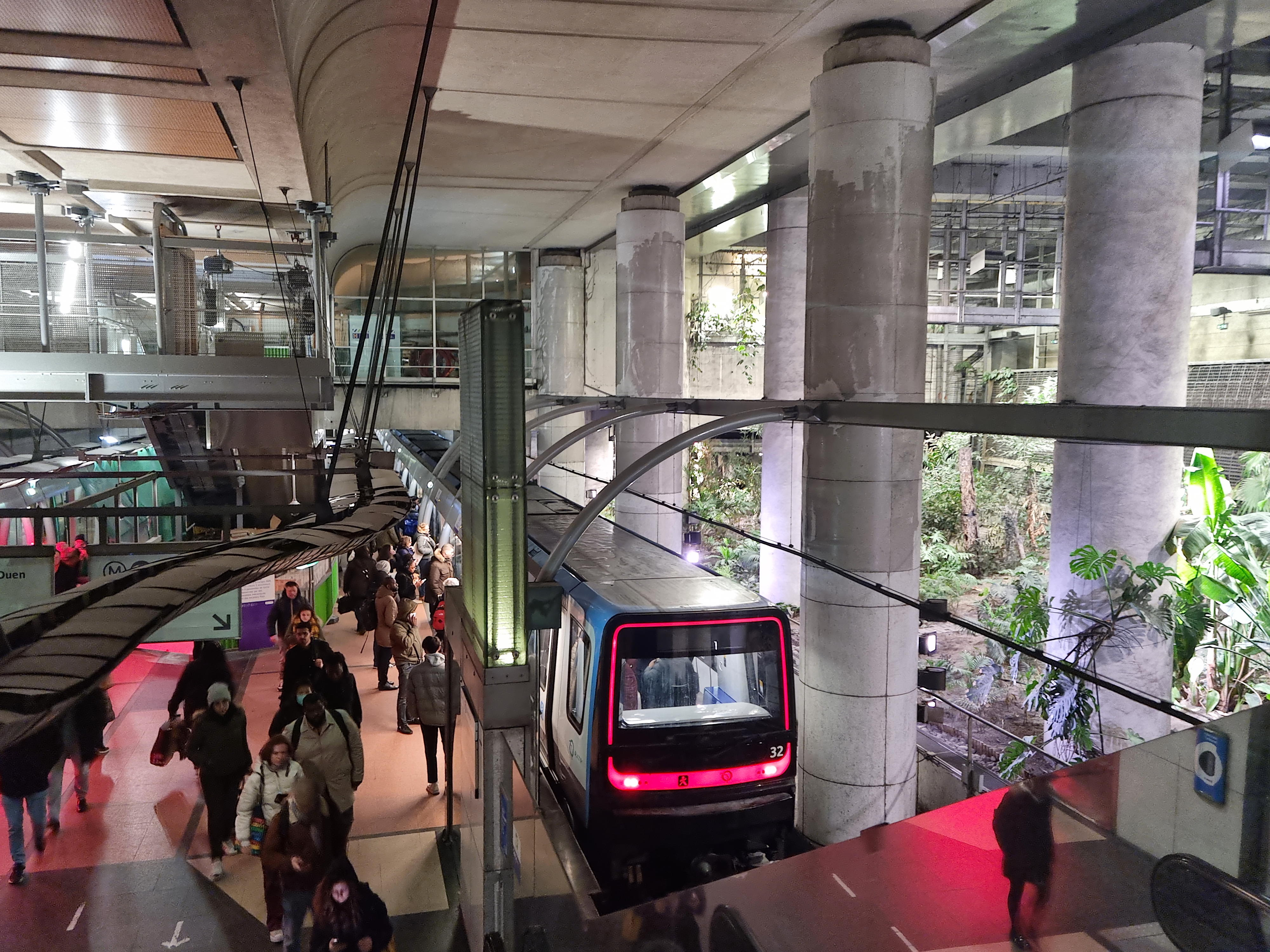
- MP 14 automatic rolling stock at Gare de Lyon in the 12th arrondissement

Overview
- Locale: Paris, Saint-Denis, Saint-Ouen-sur-Seine, Clichy, Le Kremlin-Bicêtre, Gentilly, Villejuif, Chevilly-Larue, L'Haÿ-les-Roses, Thiais, Paray-Vieille-Poste
- Termini: Saint-Denis–Pleyel; Aéroport d'Orly
- Connecting lines: Paris Metro Paris Metro Line 1 Paris Metro Line 3 Paris Metro Line 4 Paris Metro Line 6 Paris Metro Line 7 Paris Metro Line 8 Paris Metro Line 9 Paris Metro Line 11 Paris Metro Line 12 Paris Metro Line 13 RER RER A RER B RER C RER D RER E Tramways in Île-de-France Île-de-France tramway Line 3a Île-de-France tramway Line 3b Île-de-France tramway Line 7 Transilien Transilien Line J (Paris-Saint-Lazare) Transilien Line L (Paris-Saint-Lazare) Transilien Line R (Paris-Gare-de-Lyon)
- Stations: 21

Service
- System: Paris Métro
- Operator: RATP
- Rolling stock: MP 14 CA (72 trains as of 5 May 2025)
- Ridership: 152m (avg. per year); 3rd/16 (2025)

History
- Opened: 15 October 1998; 28 years ago

Technical
- Line length: 27.8 km (17.3 mi)
- Trip time: 41 min
- Track gauge: 1,435 mm (4 ft 8 1/2 in) standard gauge with roll ways for the rubber tired wheels outside of the steel rails
- Electrification: 750 V DC guide bars on either side of the track
- Conduction system: Automatic (SAET)
- Average inter-station distance: 1,388 m (4,554 ft)
Route map
- (*) Under construction (**) Planned

Paris Metro Line 14 (French: Ligne 14 du métro de Paris) is one of the sixteen lines currently open on the Paris Métro. It connects Saint-Denis–Pleyel and Aéroport d'Orly on a northwest–southeast diagonal via the three major stations of Gare Saint-Lazare, the Châtelet–Les-Halles complex, and Gare de Lyon. The line goes through the centre of Paris and also serves the communes of Saint-Denis, Saint-Ouen-sur-Seine, Clichy, Le Kremlin-Bicêtre, Gentilly, Villejuif, Chevilly-Larue, L'Haÿ-les-Roses, Thiais and Paray-Vieille-Poste.

The first Paris Métro line built from scratch since the 1930s, line 14 has been operated completely automatically since its opening in 1998, and the very positive return of that experiment motivated the retrofitting of Line 1 for full automation. Before the start of its commercial service Line 14 was known as project Météor, an acronym for MÉTro Est-Ouest Rapide.

The line has been used as a showcase for the expertise of the RATP (the operator), Alstom, Systra and Siemens Mobility (constructors of the rolling stock and automated equipment respectively) when they bid internationally to build metro systems.

A northward extension to Mairie de Saint-Ouen opened in December 2020. The line extended further north to Saint-Denis–Pleyel and south to Aéroport d'Orly, as part of the Grand Paris Express project, on 24 June 2024. Those extensions made Line 14 the longest in the Métro, at 27.8 km of length. As of Fall 2025, it is the busiest line of the Paris Metro, carrying around 820,000 riders per weekday.

== Chronology ==
- 1983: RER A, which was built to desaturate Métro Line 1, also comes to saturation. A new line on the West ↔ East axis is needed.
- 1987: RATP and SNCF each coin new route projects to desaturate Lines 1 and A :
  - SNCF coins project ÉOLE, an RER axis connecting the Paris-Est suburban network to Saint-Lazare with an upcoming extension westbound towards La Défense,
  - RATP coins project MÉTEOR – a subway line connecting Porte Maillot to Porte d'Ivry alongside RER A –
- 1989: French Government validates ÉOLE straightaway, and sends RATP back to the drawing board.
- October 1989: French Prime minister of the time, Michel Rocard, validates both projects, yet limits them to their parisian section due to budget constraints :
  - ÉOLE is a mere tunnel from Paris-Est to Saint-Lazare with the two aforementioned stations,
  - MÉTEOR's second project – a subway line from Saint-Lazare to Maison Blanche along the Seine, with planned extensions north to Asnières by taking over line 13's northwestern branch, and south towards Orly airport – is limited at first to Madeleine north (in order to avoid supplemental charge on Line 13) and to the brand new Bibliothèque François Mitterrand station south, with the actual Olympiades station initially used as the line's depot.
- September 1993: Sandrine, Météor's tunnel boring machine, starts digging.
- 28 September 1994: RATP reuses the immerged caissons technique, 90 years after line 4, to create Méteor's tunnel under the Seine.
- 26 May 1997: Météor test runs begin.
- 15 October 1998: Météor is inaugurated as Line 14 between Madeleine and Bibliothèque François Mitterrand. It's the first modern subway line of the Paris Métro : Driverless, with 120 meters long stations equipped with platform screen doors and full access for people with reduced mobility, all from day one.
- 15 February 2003: while digging the first southern extension, a kindergarten's recess courtyard collapses in Paris' 13th arrondissement, halting the digging process and causing delays.
- 16 December 2003: northern extension from Madeleine to Saint-Lazare opens, traffic surges by 30%
- 26 June 2007: first southern extension from Bibliothèque François Mitterrand to Olympiades opens, with a new workshop opened further southwest towards Maison Blanche
- 3 March 2014: first of eighteen MP 05 trains enters into revenue service
- 12 October 2020: first of thirty five MP 14 trains enters into revenue service
- 14 December 2020: second northern extension from Saint-Lazare to Mairie de Saint-Ouen opens, except Porte de Clichy.
- 28 January 2021: Porte de Clichy opens to passengers, finalising RATP's attempt to use line 14 to alleviate traffic on line 13.
- 13 April 2023: last runs of both MP 89 and MP 05 rolling stock on the line, the two are subsequently transferred to Line 4
- 24 June 2024: third northern extension from Mairie de Saint-Ouen to Saint-Denis–Pleyel opens
- 24 June 2024: second southern extension from Olympiades to Aéroport d'Orly opens, except Villejuif–Gustave Roussy which is still in construction.
- 18 January 2025: Villejuif–Gustave Roussy opens for line 14, the line 15's platform still closed.

== Development ==
=== Project Météor ===
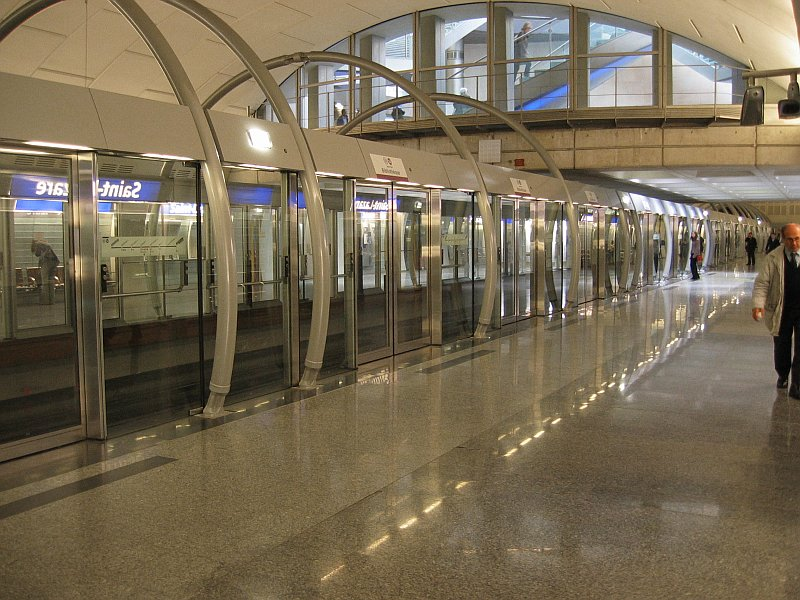
Line 14 – Saint-Lazare station

The original Line 14 linked Invalides with Porte de Vanves until 1976, when it was merged into the southern section of the current Line 13.

Paris's east–west axis across has long been heavily travelled: Line 1 of the Métro began approaching saturation in the 1940s, necessitating the construction of Line A of the RER in the 1960s and '70s, which became the busiest rail route in Europe (by 2010 there were more than a million passengers each working day). To improve service capacity, the SACEM (Système d'aide à la conduite, à l'exploitation et à la maintenance —"Assisted driving, control and maintenance system") was installed on the central run of Line A in September 1989. This improved efficiency and reduced the interval between trains to just two minutes, yet proved ultimately insufficient to absorb the increasing demand. To cater permanently to demand on the busy artery between Auber and Gare de Lyon new rail lines would have to be built.

Two proposals were made by French transport companies: the SNCF (national rail and RER operator) suggested a new tunnel between Châtelet and Gare de Lyon for Line D of the RER, which until then was limited to Châtelet. But more importantly it proposed "Project EOLE" ("Est-Ouest Liaison Express"), the creation of a new standard gauge line, initially from Paris's eastern suburbs to Saint-Lazare, with an extension to the western suburbs in mind as the Saint-Lazare RER E station is oriented towards the west instead of towards the station's rail yards up north.

In 1987, the RATP proposed "project Météor", ("Métro Est-Ouest Rapide"), the creation of a new Métro line from Porte Maillot on the edge of the 16th arrondissement to the Maison Blanche district in the 13th, an area poorly served by transport despite its large population. The project would fit well with the regeneration of the Tolbiac district on the left bank around the new Bibliothèque Nationale de France, in that arrondissement. But RATP's project was initially rejected by the French government.

The plans to go to Porte Maillot were eventually abandoned in favour of a terminus at Saint-Lazare, with the later possibility of extending the line to Clichy and assimilating the Asnières branch of Line 13, thus simplifying its complicated operation.

Given the pressing need, the council of Ministers of Michel Rocard's government approved the projects in October 1989. However, budgetary constraints forced the reduction of both. In the first stage, EOLE would be but a simple extension of trains from the suburbs to the new underground station at Saint-Lazare and Météor limited to the central Madeleine—Bibliothèque run, thus leaving the main railway station of Saint-Lazare and the heart of the 13th arrondissement unserved for the time being.

=== Construction ===
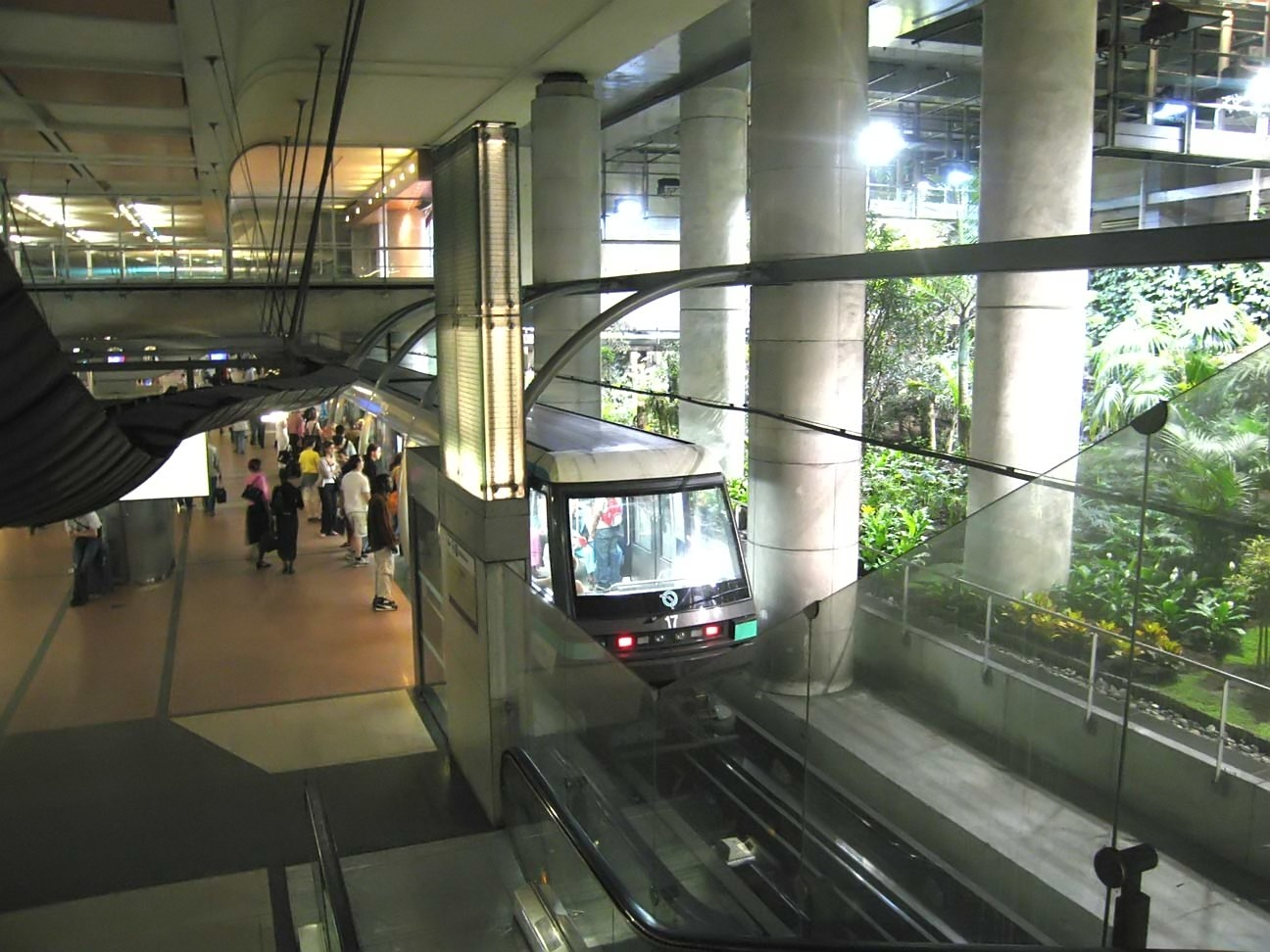
A train on line 14, direction Olympiades, at Gare de Lyon.

From November 1989 until the end of 1992, exploratory shafts and galleries were dug; tunnelling proper lasted from July 1993 until early 1995. In September 1993, Sandrine was baptised near la Bastille; a tunnel boring machine eighty metres (260 feet) long and eleven metres (36 feet) wide, it was capable of drilling a tunnel 8.6 metres (28 feet) across. Working twenty-four hours a day, five days a week, she bored twenty-five metres (82 feet) below the water table. The terrain, made mostly of loosely packed limestone and marl was favourable to drilling and the tunnel advanced at a respectable 350 metres (380 yards) a month. The tunnel passes underneath seven Métro lines, the sewers, Clichy-Capucines, and four underground carparks and passes over two RER lines.

Works at the site and the excavation of excavated material from the bassin de l'Arsenal were delayed two weeks by a flood of the Seine, the waterway route having been chosen to minimise heavy traffic in the city. The tunnel reached the future Pyramides station on 17 January 1995, and Madeleine on 15 March; it stopped underneath boulevard Haussmann in August and was brought to the surface through shafts there the same month.

At the other end of the line, from Gare de Lyon to Tolbiac the tunnel was excavated directly from the surface. It crossed the Seine upstream from pont de Tolbiac, supported by submerged beams. The last beam was implanted on 28 September 1994.

As a cost-saving measure, the section from Gare de Lyon to the Bassin de l'Arsenal was excavated at the same time as the tunnels of Line D of the RER Châtelet–Les Halles. The 816,000 m^{3} (1,067,000 cu yd) of debris excavated is about twice the volume of the Tour Montparnasse, Paris's largest building; and the 19,000 tonnes (18,700 long tons; 20,900 short tons) of steel needed for re-inforced concrete and structural support is twice the mass of the Eiffel Tower.

=== Incidents ===
Travellers have been largely satisfied with Line 14's speed and service. However, despite its automation it has not been free of accidents. While the platform doors prevent access to the rails, they are susceptible to electric outages which have halted service entirely. On 20 September 2004, two trains stopped entirely in the tunnel after a signalling failure. On 22 December 2006, passengers were trapped for one and a half hours after an electrical failure on the line which arose from a mechanical failure. Technological failures have occurred twice: on 21 March 2007 traffic was interrupted between Gare de Lyon and Bibliothèque François Mitterrand; and again on 21 August 2007 a technical failure stopped service.

=== Extensions ===
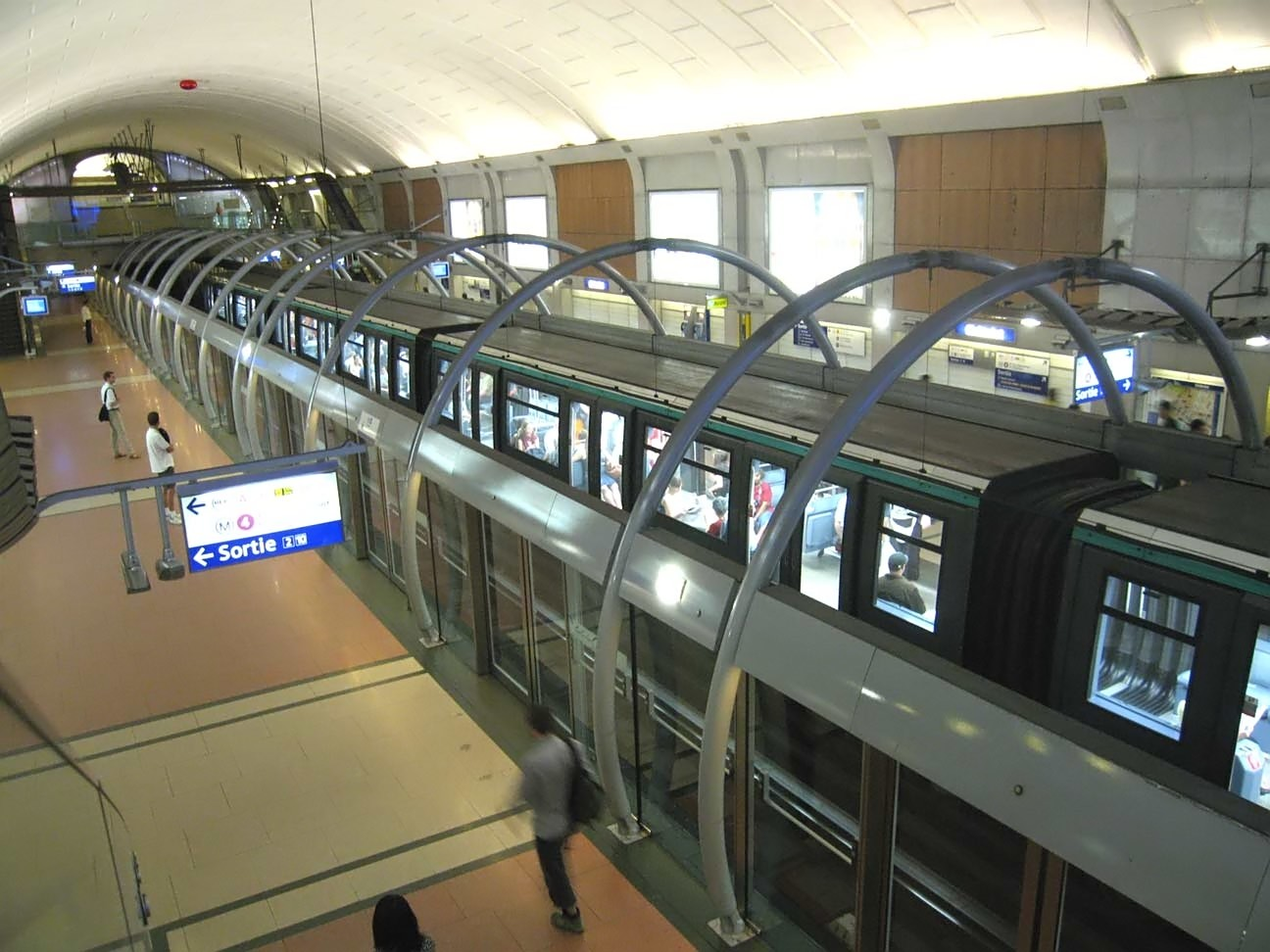
A train at the station Châtelet.

Traffic on the line grew quickly : After five years in service, there were 240,000 daily passengers in October 2003. That same year, service was interrupted several times to allow the installation of material for an extension north from Madeleine to Saint-Lazare. This section was opened on 16 December 2003, and the line saw a 30% increase in traffic thereafter : Saint Lazare is the most important node on the network after Gare du Nord and Châtelet.

In 2007, the line was extended south to Olympiades, an area of high rise towers in the XIIIe arrondissement poorly served by the Métro. The construction of the extension was relatively simple, as the tunnel was built at the same time as the rest of the line. Initially planned to open in 2006, work was delayed by the collapse of a primary school courtyard during the night of 14–15 October 2003. Since then traffic has grown again: at the end of 2007, an average of 450,000 passengers used the line on a working day. Due to its use as a train maintenance area, a new maintenance area was constructed.

A second northern extension to Mairie de Saint-Ouen opened on 14 December 2020, somewhat helping to desaturate the section of Line 13 between this station and Saint-Lazare. This extension was originally supposed to open in 2017, but construction was postponed several times during the course of 2016 and 2017, and the COVID-19 pandemic also hampered opening efforts during the course of 2020. The opening of this extension lengthened line 14 from 9 km (5.6 mi) to just shy of 14 km (8.7 mi).

As part of the Grand Paris Express expansion plans, Line 14 was again expanded in both directions. The northern extension from Saint-Lazare was meant to reduce the chronic overcrowding on Line 13. The adopted solution crosses the two branches of Line 13 with stations at Porte de Clichy on the Asnières–Gennevilliers branch and Mairie de Saint-Ouen on the Saint-Denis branch. Another station interconnects with the RER C station Saint-Ouen, another one with the Transilien Paris-Saint-Lazare lines at Pont Cardinet, and the last one with the RER D at Saint-Denis–Pleyel. Construction on the extension began in 2014, and it was opened on 14 December 2020, except for Saint-Denis–Pleyel on 24 June 2024.

Line 14 was also extended south-eastwards from Olympiades towards Orly Airport, with 6 intermediate stations. Both future ends of the line were connected with the completion of the southern extension on 3 March 2021 and the northern extension on 15 April 2021. Both extensions were opened on 24 June 2024. A fare of €13.00, more than five times the standard Metro fare, applies for journeys starting or ending at Orly Airport. One station – Villejuif–Gustave Roussy – was not ready to open with the rest of the southern extension in June 2024 because of the monumental access corridors leading to said station's connection to the upcoming Paris Métro Line 15 ; station which only opened on 18 January 2025.

In February 2012 the STIF announced a brand new class of rolling stock, the MP 14, to replace the current line of MP 89CA (and upcoming MP 05) stock along Line 14 around 2020. This new stock will consist of eight-car train formations, longer than used to date on the Métro, with the MP 89CA and MP 05 stock reassigned to other lines (including the possibility of Lines 4, 6, or 11, should they one day become automated).

=== Statistics ===
The number of passengers grew year-by-year on the line.

Year
Passengers (millions)

1998	1999	2000	2001	2002	2003	2004	2007	2008	2009	2010	2011	2012	2013	2014	2015	2016	2017	2018	2019	2020	2021	2022	2023	2024	2025
3.5	19.0	25.0	31.8	38.7	40.8	64.1	66.9	77.3	79.7	79.4	79.9	78.5	77.6	77.9	78.9	80.2	83.3	87.4	92.0	50.8	78.7	98.0	92.2	116.6	152.2

== Impact ==
The experience in automated control and doors has inspired several new projects. In 1998, the RATP began planning to automate several existing lines, despite the heavy cost. Automation work on Line 1 began in 2007, along with the introduction of doors on the platform. The upgrade was finished in 2012. In 2022, Line 4 was upgraded and automated following the successful Line 1 project.

The widespread introduction of platform doors for passenger safety is planned, despite the project's cost. In January 2004, ground level signalling to indicate the doorways was tested on Line 13 at Saint-Lazare station. Several different door models were tested during 2006 and Kaba was chosen to supply them. After testing, platform doors will be rolled out across the network, first in certain stations on Line 13, then on the totality of Line 1 in preparation for its complete automation. (Note: (éd. 2004:135–136))

== Technology ==
This new line parallel to Line A took the opportunity to incorporate innovations on the rest of the network: the stations are larger and, at 120 metres (390 ft), longer and thus can accommodate eight carriages. The runs between stations are longer, allowing a rolling speed of close to 40 km/h (25 mph), close to double that of the historical Paris metro lines and approaching that of the RER. Lastly, the line is completely automated and driverless, which makes Paris Métro Line 14 the first-ever large-scale driverless metro line in a capital (although driverless operation was already running on the VAL system in Lille and the MAGGALY technology of Lyon Metro Line D).

Some features of Line 14's train control system are run under the OpenVMS operating system. Its control system is noted in the field of software engineering of critical systems because safety properties on some safety-critical parts of the systems were proved using the B-Method, a formal method.

Line 14 has some unusual design features – unlike other stations in Paris, its floor tiling is not bitumenised, and platform screen doors were installed at stations from day one to prevent passengers from falling onto the track or from committing suicide.

=== Signaling system ===
Météor's communications-based train control (CBTC) system was supplied by Siemens Mobility including monitoring from an operations control centre, equipment for 7 stations and equipment for 19 six-car trains, resulting in a headway of 85 seconds. It was the base for the Trainguard MT CBTC, which then equipped other rapid transit lines throughout the world.

=== Rolling stock ===
Line 14 uses rubber-tyre rolling stock. Three types of trains were used: MP 89CA (21 trains as of 3 November 2013), MP 05 (11 trains as of 20 March 2016), and MP 14 (22 train as of November 2022). The last MP89 and MP05 ran on the line in 2023 and were moved to the newly automated Line 4. The MP89 and MP05 contained six cars, while the MP14 trains which displaced them have eight cars. All Line 14 stations were designed from the start to accommodate eight cars, and the introduction of the MP 14 greatly increased capacity on the line.

== Map ==
Line 14's onboard diagram

== Stations ==
Station	Image	Commune	Opened	Interchanges	Distance (in km)	
Saint-Denis–Pleyel		Saint-Denis	24 June 2024	(at Carrefour Pleyel) (at Stade de France–Saint-Denis)	–	0.0
Mairie de Saint-Ouen; Région Île-de-France		Saint-Ouen-sur-Seine	14 December 2020	Paris Metro Paris Metro Line 13	1.1	1.1
Saint-Ouen		Saint-Ouen-sur-Seine, Clichy	14 December 2020	(at Saint-Ouen)	1.2	2.3
Porte de Clichy; Tribunal de Paris		Paris (17th)	28 January 2021	Paris Metro Paris Metro Line 13 Tramways in Île-de-France Île-de-France tramway Line 3b RER RER C	1.6	3.9
Pont Cardinet		Paris (17th)	14 December 2020	(at Pont Cardinet)	0.6	4.5
Saint-Lazare		Paris (8th, 9th)	16 December 2003	(at Saint-Augustin) (at Haussmann–Saint-Lazare) (at Saint-Lazare)	1.7	6.2
Madeleine		Paris (8th)	15 October 1998	Paris Metro Paris Metro Line 8 Paris Metro Line 12	0.7	6.9
Pyramides		Paris (1st)	15 October 1998	Paris Metro Paris Metro Line 7	1.0	7.9
Châtelet		Paris (1st, 4th)	15 October 1998	(at Châtelet–Les Halles)	1.2	9.1
Gare de Lyon		Paris (12th)	15 October 1998	(at Gare de Lyon) (at Gare de Lyon)	2.4	11.5
Bercy		Paris (12th)	15 October 1998	Paris Metro Paris Metro Line 6	0.8	12.3
Cour Saint-Émilion		Paris (12th)	15 October 1998		1.0	13.3
Bibliothèque François Mitterrand		Paris (13th)	15 October 1998	RER RER C	0.7	14.0
Olympiades		Paris (13th)	26 June 2007		0.9	14.9
Maison Blanche		Paris (13th)	24 June 2024	Paris Metro Paris Metro Line 7	1.0	15.9
Kremlin-Bicêtre - Gentilly; Hôpital Bicêtre		Le Kremlin-Bicêtre, Gentilly	24 June 2024		1.6	17.5
Villejuif–Gustave Roussy		Villejuif	18 January 2025		1.9	19.4
L'Haÿ-les-Roses		Chevilly-Larue, L'Haÿ-les-Roses	24 June 2024		2.1	21.5
Chevilly-Larue; Marché International		Chevilly-Larue	24 June 2024	Tramways in Île-de-France Île-de-France tramway Line 7	2.2	23.7
Thiais–Orly; Pont de Rungis		Thiais	24 June 2024	(at Pont de Rungis–Aéroport d'Orly)	1.3	25.0
Paray-Vieille-Poste; Aéroport d'Orly		Paray-Vieille-Poste	24 June 2024	Tramways in Île-de-France Île-de-France tramway Line 7	2.3	27.3

== Architecture ==
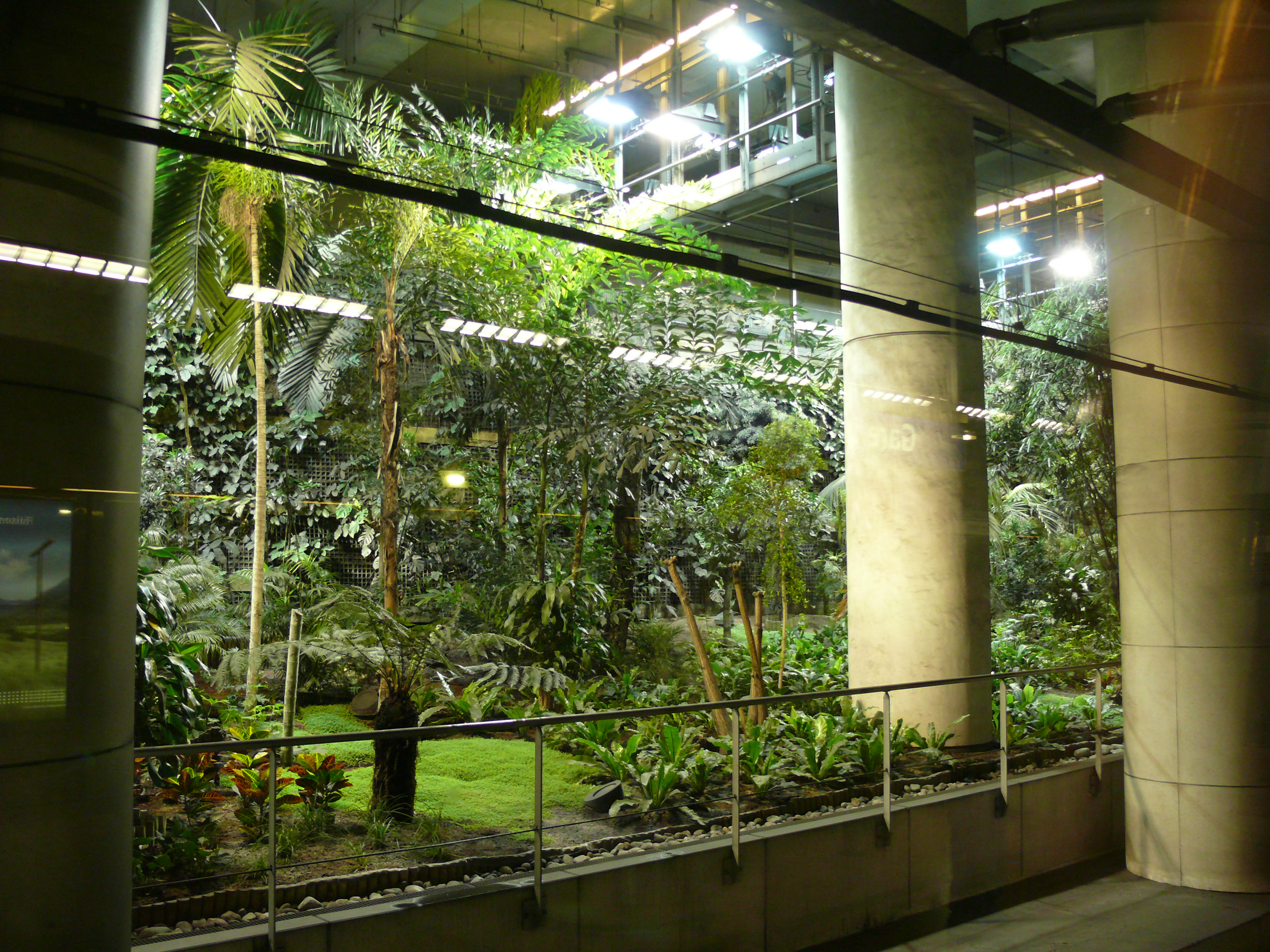
The exotic garden in Gare de Lyon.

The conceptual design of the stations sought to evoke space and openness. The size of stations, their corridors and transfer halls brings the line architecturally closer to those of the RER rather than the existing Métro lines. The RATP opted for a specific style of the new line, for instance lightly coloured tiling rather than bitumen. The use of space was designed in a contemporary manner: voluminous spaces mixed plenty of light with modern materials and overall eased the flow of passengers. According to the designers, the stations should be the reflection of a "noble public space, monumental in spirit, urban in its choice of forms and materials". Four architects designed the first seven stations on the line: Jean-Pierre Vaysse & Bernard Kohn six of them, and Antoine Grumbach & Pierre Schall the station Bibliothèque.

Saint-Lazare benefits from a well of natural light visible on the platforms, even though they are five levels below the surface. The station's exit is constructed from a glass bubble designed by Jean-Marie Charpentier and situated just in front of the Gare de Paris-Saint-Lazare, pointing towards the row of bus-stops.

Pyramides and Madeleine are endowed with a particular lighting, bright sunshine outside falls onto the platforms; a system which evidently does not work at night. Madeleine has several video projectors which allow cultural installations, for example, one on Marlène Dietrich, an actress, during the autumn of 2003.

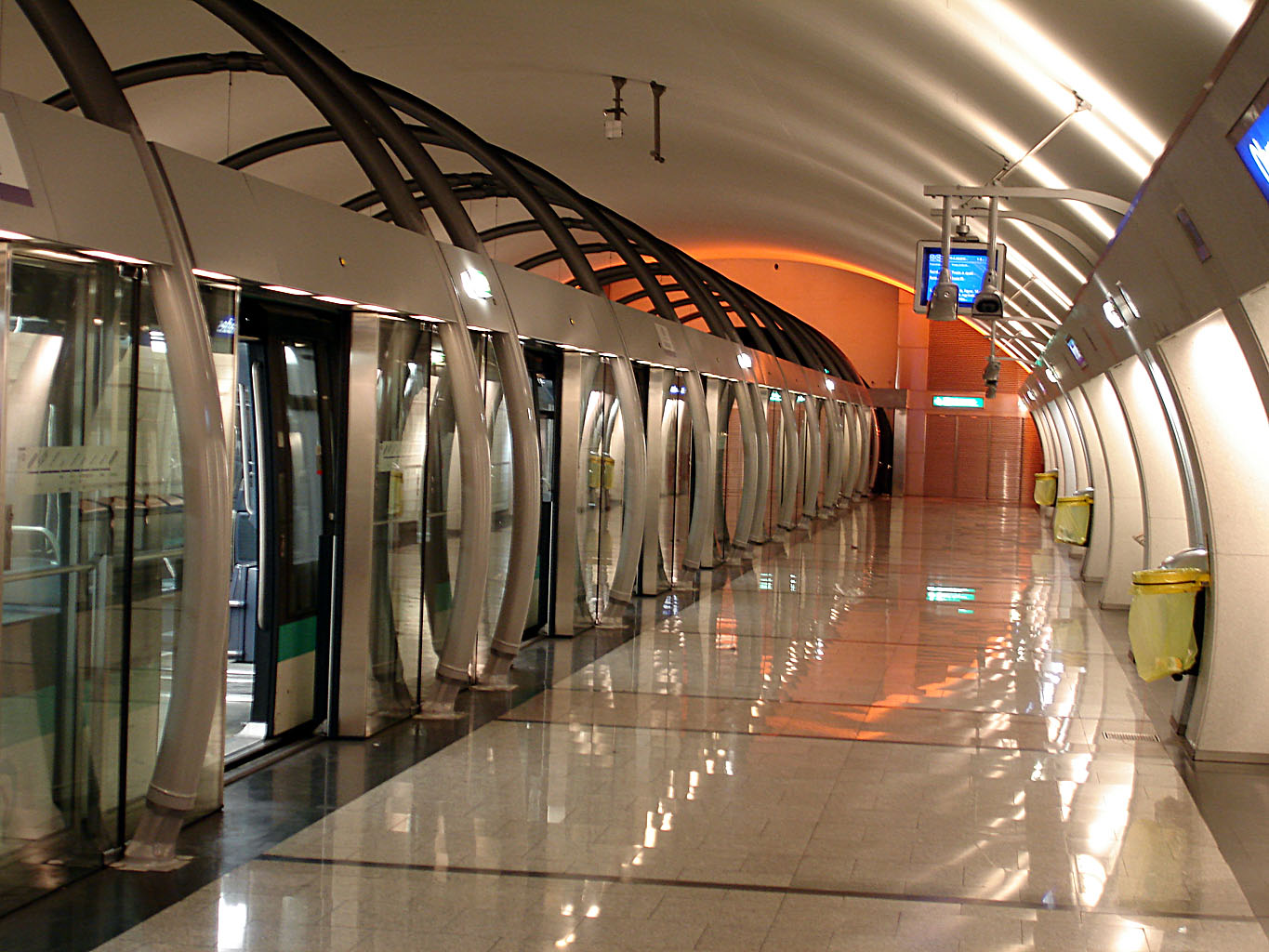
Olympiades station.

Gare de Lyon offers travellers the view of a tropical garden on the right side of trains towards Olympiades, as one enters the station. This garden is situated underneath RATP House at the foot of which the station was built. It occupies a space originally reserved for the Transport Museum. Moreover, it is the only station equipped with a central platform, the only possible layout in light of the area's underground construction density.

Bibliothèque François Mitterrand has its own unique design: monumental, fifteen metre pillars and stairs forming a semi-circle seventy metres in diameter.

Olympiades station was developed by the architects Ar.thème Associés following the line's guiding principles, defined by Bernard Kohn from 1991. The station thus is in keeping with others in its choice of materials (polished concrete arches, wood on the ceilings, etc.) as much as in its lighting, height of its ceilings, and platforms larger than the average on other lines.

On the other hand, certain stations on the line are notable due to the disagreeable odour of humidity and sulfur that one can sometimes find as far as the changeover halls. Due to the line's relative depth, it runs underneath the water-table, creating a constant risk of seepage, similar to that found on Line E of the RER.

== See also ==
- Paris
- Transport in Paris
- List of stations of the Paris Métro
- List of stations of the Paris RER
- List of metro systems
- Rail transport in France

== Bibliography ==
- (in French) "Naissance d'un métro (nouvelle ligne 14)". La Vie du Rail magazine (in French) (Special issue). Éditions La Vie du Rail. October 1998.
