= Bibliothèque François Mitterrand station =

Metro and railway station in Paris, France

Bibliothèque François Mitterrand
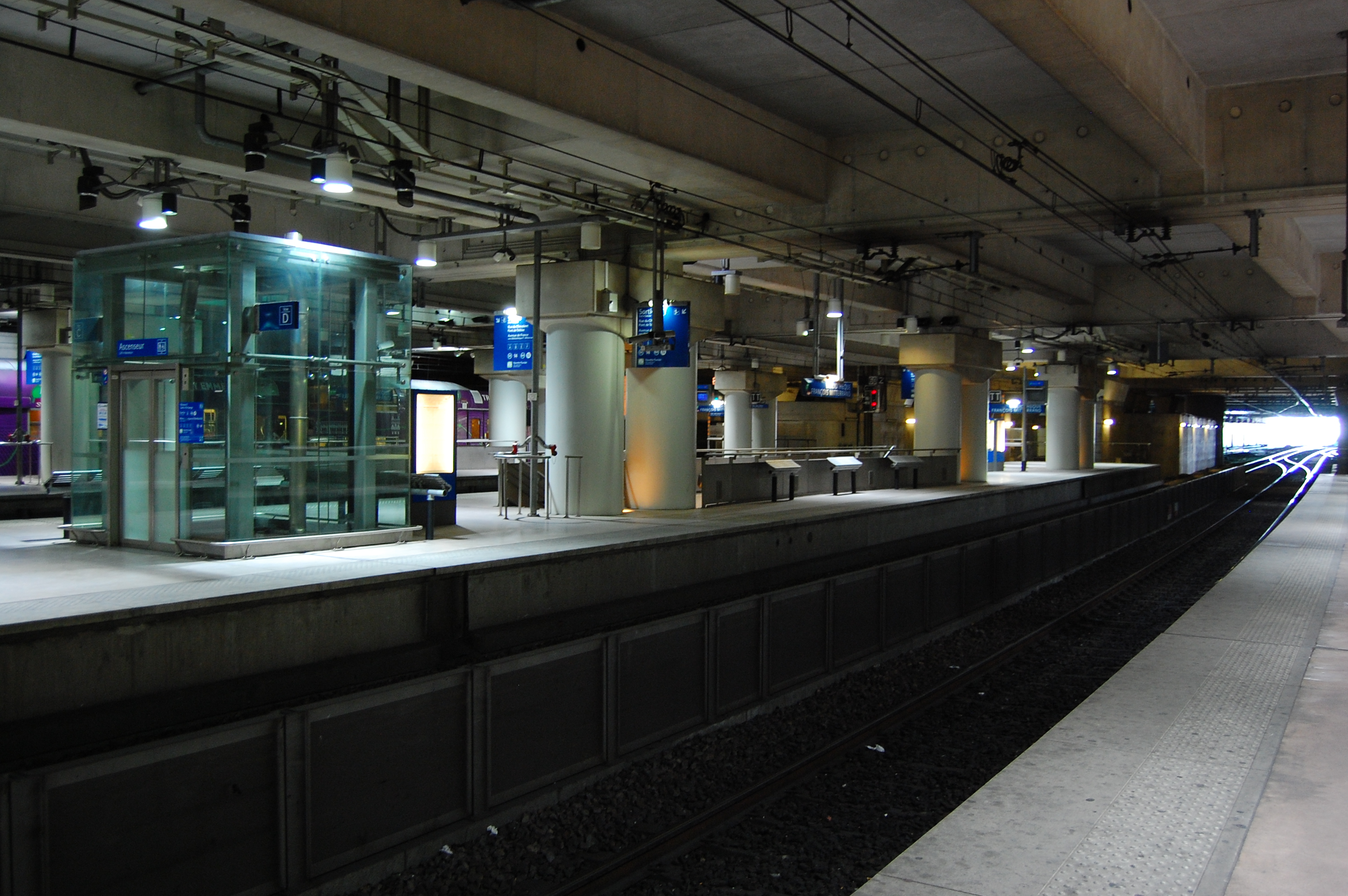
- RER C platforms in 2010

General information
- Location: 13th arrondissement of Paris; France
- Coordinates: 48°49′47.36″N 2°22′36.41″E
- Operator: Line 14: RATP Group; RER C: SNCF

Construction
- Accessible: Line 14: Yes; RER C: Yes, by prior reservation
- Architect: Antoine Grumbach

Other information
- Station code: 87328328 (RER C)
- Fare zone: 1

History
- Opened: 5 October 1998
- Rebuilt: 2007

Passengers
- 2024: 26,975,545

Services
| Preceding station | Paris Metro | Following station |
|---|---|---|
| Cour Saint-Émilion towards Saint-Denis–Pleyel | Line 14 | Olympiades towards Aéroport d'Orly |
| Preceding station | RER | Following station |
| Gare d'Austerlitz towards Pontoise, Versailles Château Rive Gauche or Saint-Quentin-en-Yvelines | RER C | Ivry-sur-Seine towards Massy-Palaiseau, Dourdan-la-Forêt or Saint-Martin-d'Étampes |
Location

Bibliothèque François Mitterrand (French pronunciation: [biblijɔtɛk fʁɑ̃swa mitɛʁɑ̃]; lit. 'François Mitterrand Library') is a station of the Paris Métro and RER, named after the former French president, François Mitterrand, and serving the area surrounding the new building of the Bibliothèque nationale de France (BnF), whose site near the station is also named after Mitterrand, and the Paris Diderot University. It is a transfer point between Line 14 of the Paris Metro and the RER C. It is situated on the Paris–Bordeaux railway.

== History ==
The Bibliothèque François Mitterrand station opened in October 1998 with the opening of Line 14. From the opening of Line 14 until 25 June 2007, this station functioned as the line's southern terminus. Further work extended the line to a new station to the southwest, Olympiades, which opened on 26 June 2007. On 24 June 2024, Line 14 is extended further south to Orly Airport. During construction of the station, the conceptual name was "Tolbiac – Masséna", before a decision was taken to name the station after the nearby Bibliothèque nationale de France.

In December 2000, the RER C station opened, allowing the transfer of passengers between the metro and RER lines. The nearby Boulevard Masséna station on RER C closed following the opening of this RER station.

== Architecture and art ==
Unlike the majority of Line 14 stations, Bibliothèque François Mitterrand station was designed by French architect and urban planner Antoine Grumbach. The station uses many of the design elements used throughout Line 14 such as platform edge doors.

Two pieces of public art are located in the station. La Pluie de citations (Rain of Quotes) by French writer Jean-Christophe Bailly consists of engraved quotes on medallions, embedded into the station architecture. L'Escalier des signes et des nombres (Staircase of Signs and Numbers) by Grumach consists of a monumental staircase with numbers in a wide variety of languages.

== Nearby attractions ==
This station serves the area known as Tolbiac, between the Seine and the train tracks of the network of the Gare d'Austerlitz, which includes the BnF and the headquarters of the Réseau Ferré de France, the BnF's large new cinema, etc.

From this station, within walking distance is the church of Notre-Dame de la Gare, rue de Domrémy, on the Place Jeanne-d'Arc.

== Station layout ==
The RER station comprises three island platforms and six tracks.

- The two most easterly tracks (Voies E and F) are southbound for the RER C.
- The two central tracks (Voies C and D) and their platforms are used in exceptional cases for the rerouting of the RER C trains at Gare d'Austerlitz. Normally the tracks are used by main lines.
- The two most westerly tracks (Voies A and B) are for the RER C direction North towards Gare d'Austerlitz.

| G | Street Level | Exit/Entrance |
| B1 | Mezzanine | to Exits/Entrances |
| B2 | Side platform with PSDs, doors will open on the right |
| B2 | Northbound | ← toward Saint-Denis–Pleyel (Cour Saint-Émilion) |
| B2 | Southbound | toward Aéroport d'Orly (Olympiades) → |
| B2 | Side platform with PSDs, doors will open on the right |

== Gallery ==
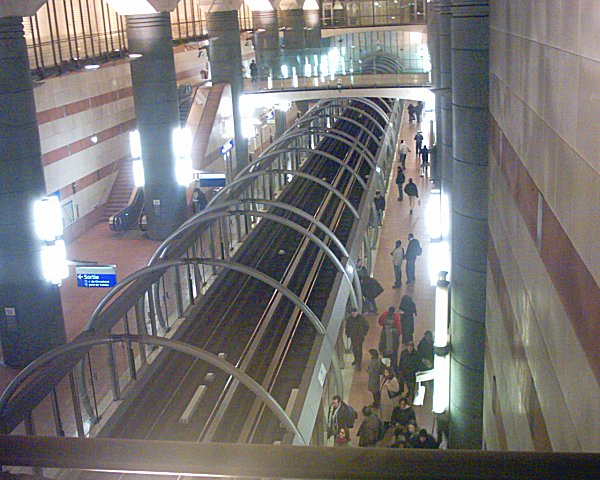
Line 14 platforms at Bibliothèque François Mitterrand

== See also ==
- List of stations of the Paris Métro
- List of stations of the Paris RER
