= Bernard Kohn =

French-American architect

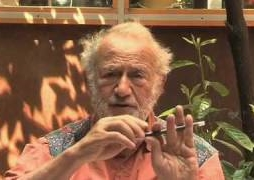
Bernard Kohn

Bernard Kohn (born 1931) is a French-American architect, educator and urban planner.

== Personal life ==
Kohn was born to a Jewish family. His parents immigrated from France to the United States in 1940s due to the impending threat of Nazi invasion. After moving, he studied at Syracuse University, Columbia University, and at the University of Pennsylvania under the tutelage of Louis Kahn.

== Work ==
Kohn taught at the Urbanism Department of Yale University and is associated with the New Urbanism movement. He worked in the United States and in India after being inspired by Sir Patrick Geddes before returning to France in 1969, where he worked at the Ministry of Cultural Affairs as a pedagogy consultant.

Together with sociologist Michel Herrou and architect Georges Maurios, he founded a multidisciplinary agency called "Environment and Behavior" where they created a constructive system made of modular components that allow for modification by the inhabitants. Kohn is credited with visualizing the Sabarmati Riverfront Development Project for the first time in the 1960s.
