= École des Beaux-Arts (disambiguation) =

École des Beaux-Arts may refer to:

- École Supérieure des Beaux-Arts, Genève
- École nationale supérieure des beaux-arts de Lyon
- École des beaux-arts de Montréal
- Beaux-Arts de Paris
- School of Fine Arts of Casablanca
- École des Beaux-Arts d'Indochine, a former name of the Vietnam University of Fine Arts

== See also ==
- Beaux Arts (disambiguation)
- Musée des Beaux-Arts (disambiguation)
- School of Fine Arts (disambiguation)
