= Parc de Bercy =

Urban park in Paris, France

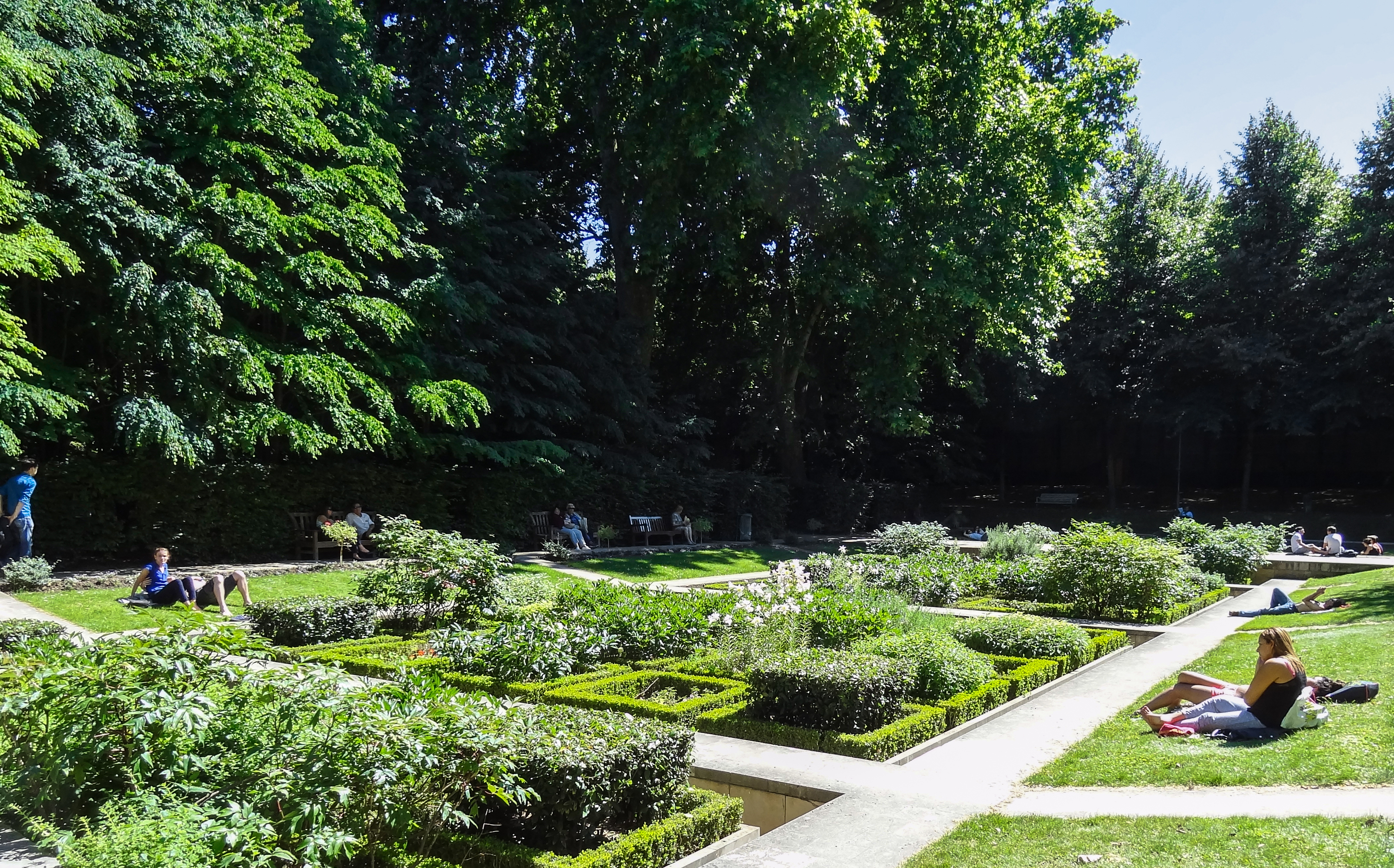
- The Jardin des Senteurs in the Parc de Bercy
- Interactive map of Parc de Bercy
- Type: Urban park
- Location: 12th arrondissement, Paris
- Coordinates: 48°50′02″N 2°23′03″E
- Area: 34.6 acres (14.0 ha)
- Created: 18 September 1997
- Operator: Direction des Espaces Verts et de l'Environnement (DEVE)
- Status: Open all year
- Public transit: Located near the Métro stations Bercy and Cour Saint-Émilion

The Parc de Bercy (French pronunciation: [paʁk də bɛʁsi]; English: Park of Bercy) is a public park located along the Rive Droite in the 12th arrondissement of Paris. Development started in 1994 on the site of a former wine depot (the wine warehouses of Bercy, which in the early 20th century was the largest wine market in the world) before an official opening three years later by Mayor Jean Tiberi. Sponsored by President François Mitterrand, the project covered 14 hectares (34.6 acres).

Composed of three different gardens on different themes connected by foot bridges, the Parc de Bercy is Paris's tenth largest park. It is accessible by Bercy and Cour Saint-Émilion Métro stations, as well as by a foot bridge to the Mitterrand site of the Bibliothèque nationale de France (BnF) on the other side of the Seine. The AccorHotels Arena, colloquially known as Bercy in Paris, is located on the park's northern edge.

== Components ==
=== Gardens ===
The park consists of three gardens designed by architects Bernard Huet, Marylène Ferrand, Jean-Pierre Feugas and Bernard Le Roy, assisted by landscapers Ian Le Caisne and Philippe Raguin between 1993 and 1997:

- The "Romantic Garden", which includes fishponds and dunes;
- The "Flowerbeds", dedicated to plant life;
- "The Meadows", an area of open lawns shaded by tall trees.

In the northeast of the park stands the Cinémathèque Française (the former American Center) designed by Frank Gehry; on the raised terraces are the 21 sculptures of Rachid Khimoune's "Children of the World" installation, created in 2001 to honour children's rights.

The park is linked directly to the François Mitterrand site of the Bibliothèque nationale de France by the Simone de Beauvoir footbridge over the Seine. The area used to be an important location for Paris wine warehouses; some remains of the industry can still be seen in the park. The Musée des Arts Forains is also located here.

Parc de Bercy, Paris.

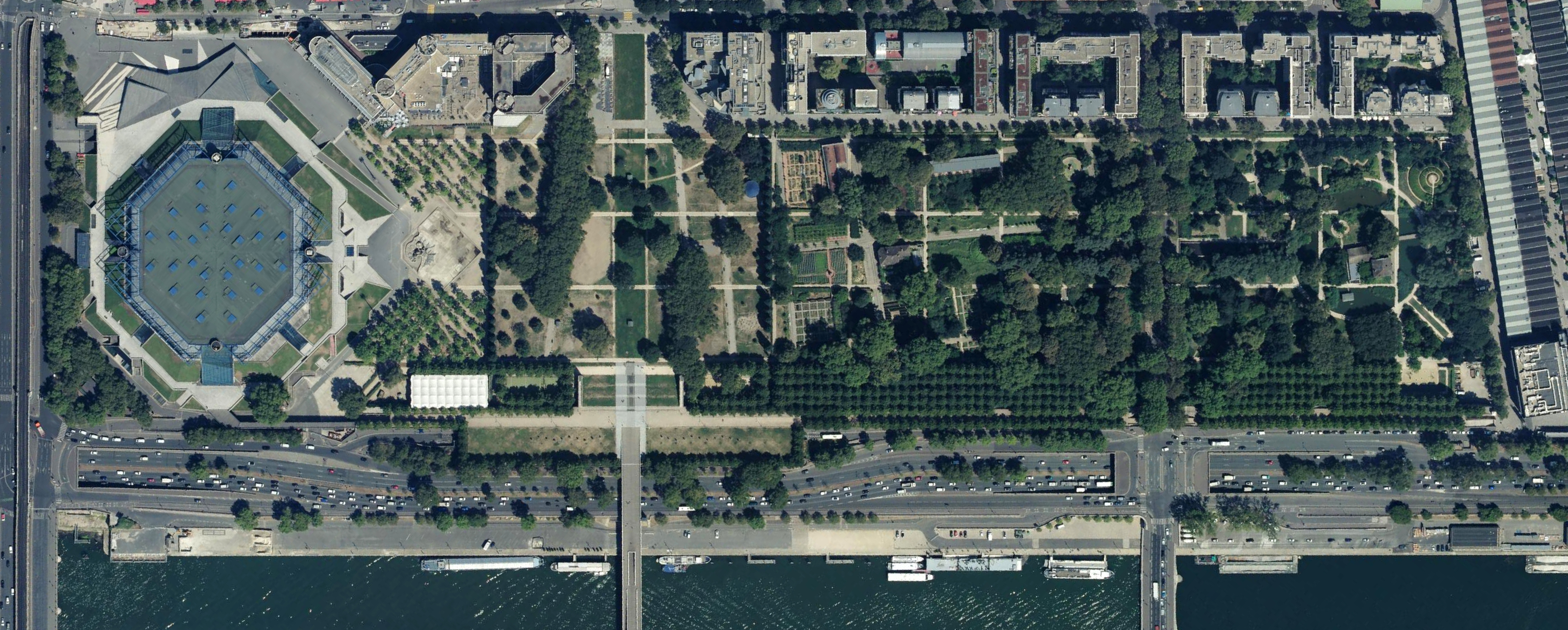
Parc de Bercy, Paris.

=== Skatepark ===
Bercy Skatepark is the second biggest in Paris covering an area of 800 square metres. It is covered and it has several ramps. Graffiti is written in spray paint on the walls and the ramps. Children, families, rollerbladers, skateboarders and BMXers visit the park.

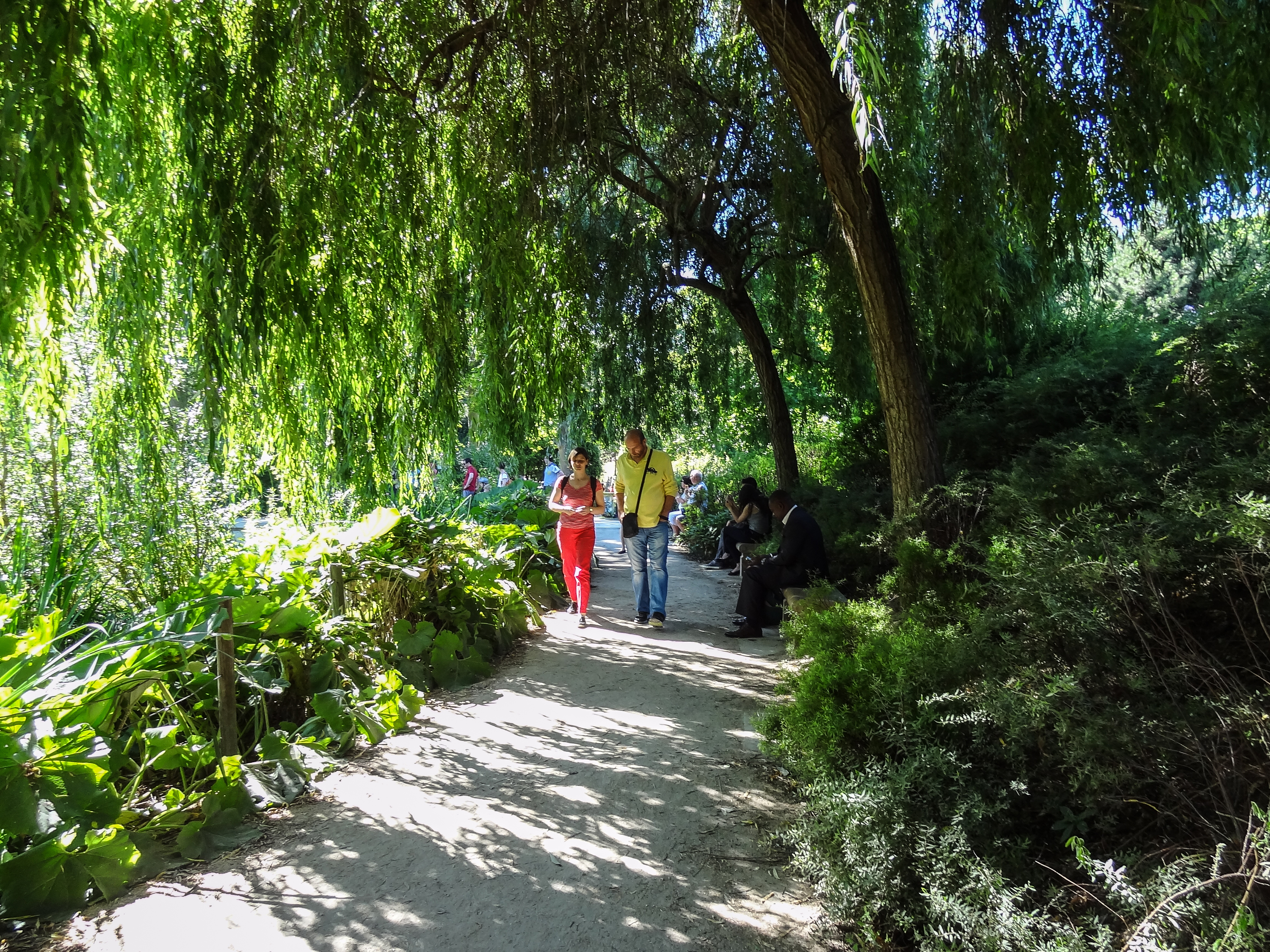

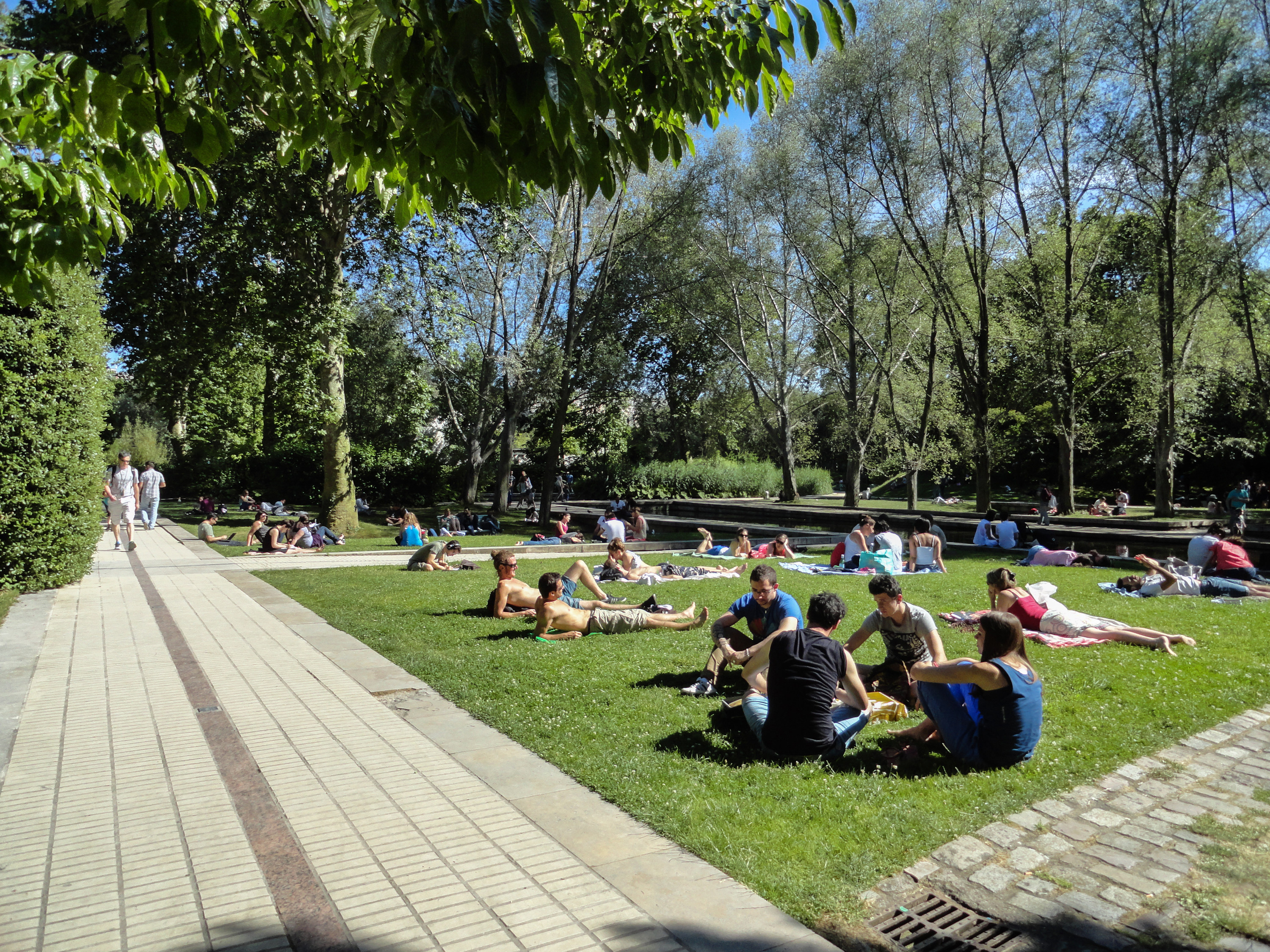

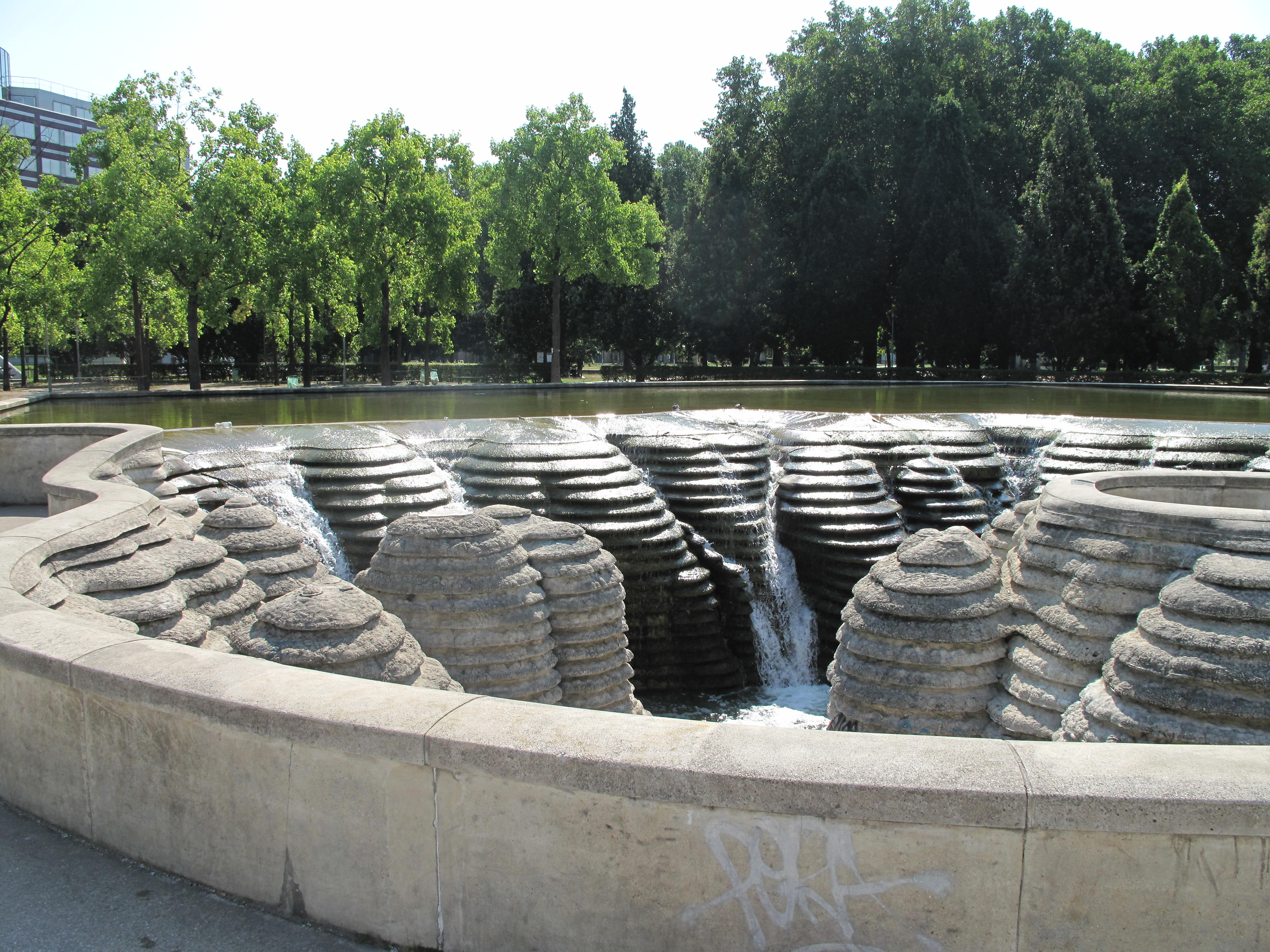

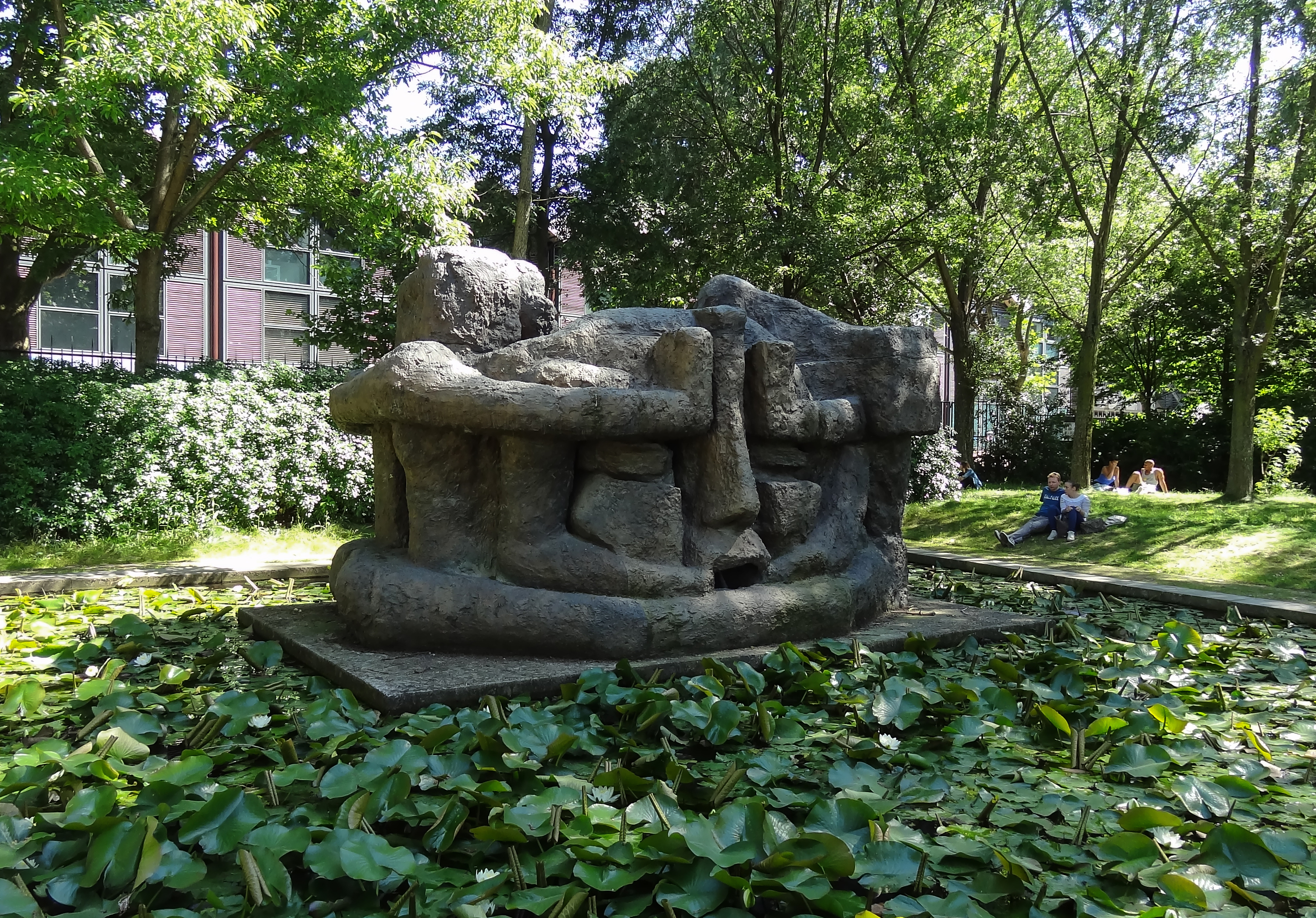

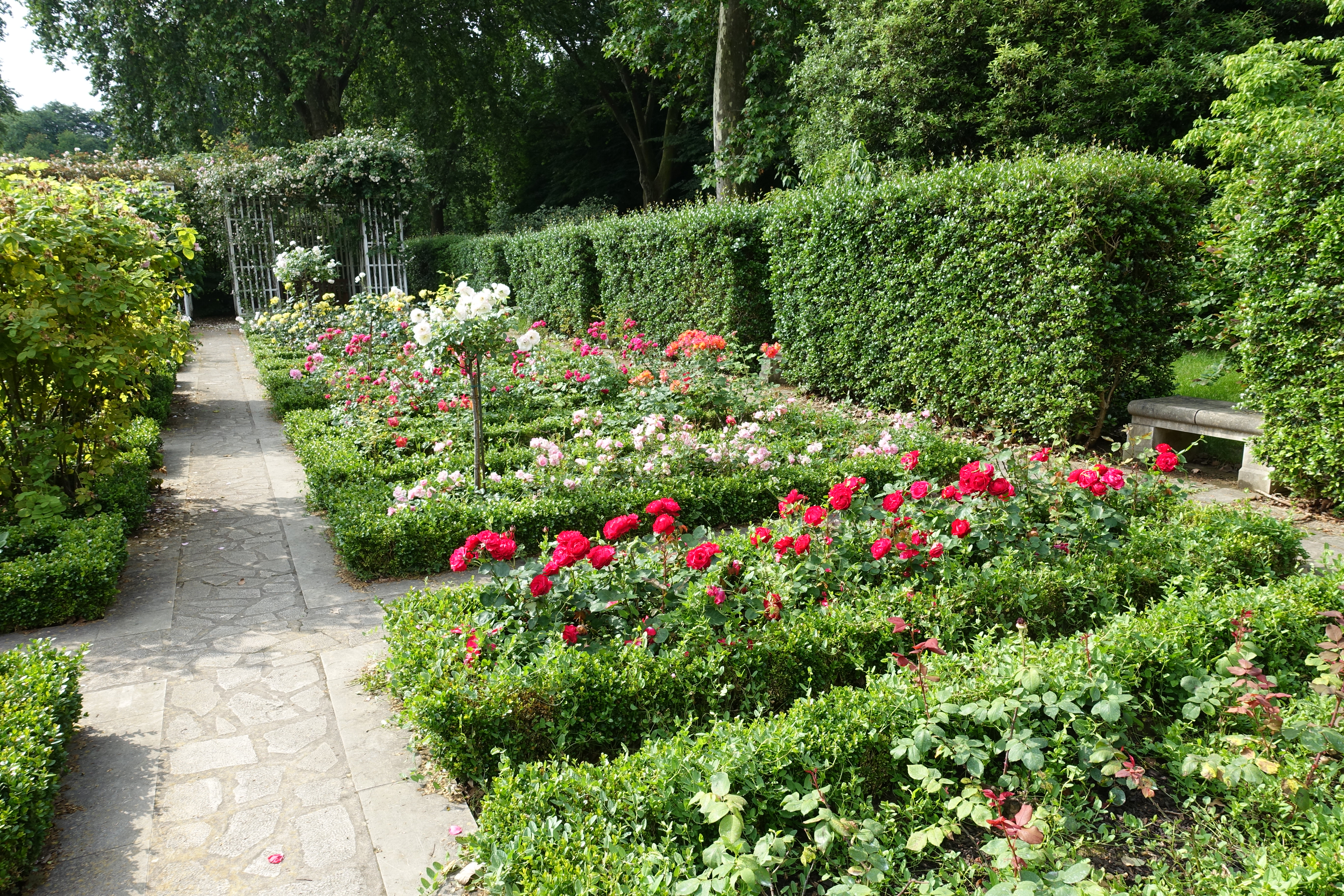

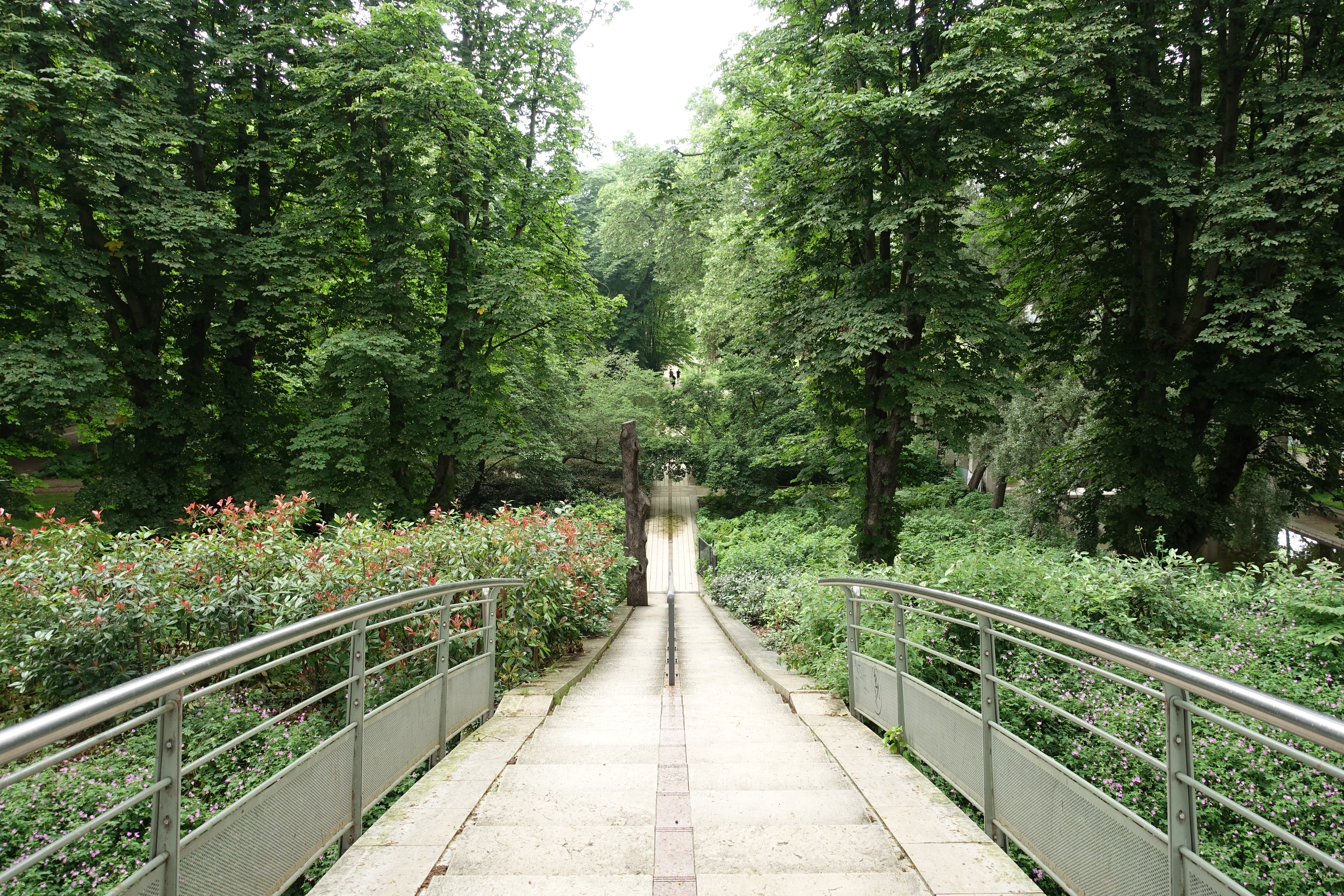

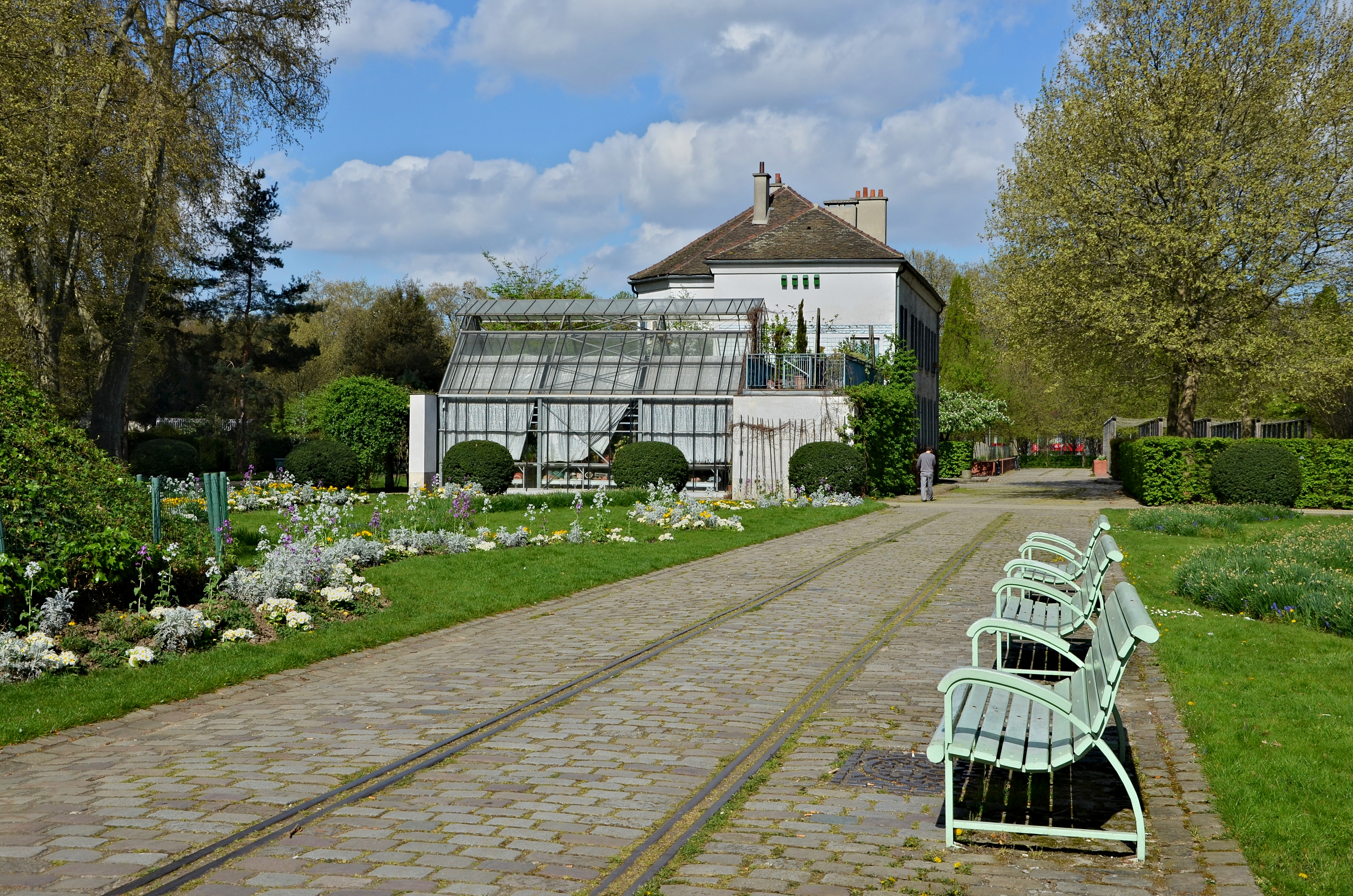

== See also ==
- Bercy
- Ministry of the Economy and Finance (France)
- Wine warehouses of Bercy
