= Jeanne Magnin =

French painter, art collector and art historian (1855-1937)

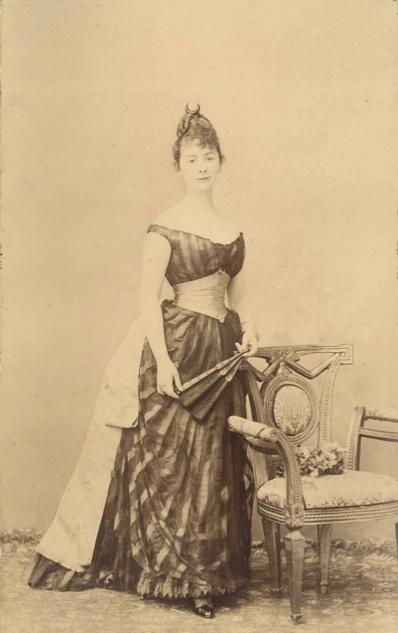
- Born: 20 September 1855; Dijon, France
- Died: 16 April 1937 (aged 81); Paris
- Occupations: painter, Art historian
- Parents: Pierre Magnin (father); Pauline-Angéline Belloncle (mother)
- Relatives: Maurice Magnin (Brother)

Jeanne Magnin (20 September 1855 in Dijon – 16 April 1937 in Paris) was a French painter, engraver, art historian, and collector.

== Life ==
Jeanne Magnin trained in painting under Marguerite Escallier and then Henri Harpignies. She also learned engraving from Auguste Delâtre (1822–1907), co-founder, with Alfred Cadart, of the Société des Aquafortistes (Etching Society) in 1862.

She practiced drawing, etching and oil painting, favoring landscapes, scenes of daily life, everyday objects, and still lifes. From the 1880s onward, she also created pieces in enameled glass, which she exhibited at the 1889 World's fair and at the Musée des Arts Décoratifs in 1933.

From 1913 until her death, she devoted herself to her family history (notably to a work on her father, Pierre-Joseph Magnin, published in 1913: Joseph Magnin from 1842 to 1852. His Childhood and Youth. His Milieu, to art history articles, and to art criticism.She also compiled the catalogue of the collection of her brother, Maurice Magnin (1861–1939), the future founder of the Musée Magnin in Dijon. This catalogue was published in two volumes in 1923 under the title Cabinet d'un collectionneur parisien.

On 31 October 1928, she was elected to the Academy of Sciences, Arts, and Letters of Dijon.

At the time of her death, she was working on a catalogue of paintings and drawings from the French school in the Maurice Magnin collection, published by her brother in 1938 based on her notes.

== Works ==
- The Umbrella, pen, black ink and India ink wash, 1877, private collection.
- Still Life, etching, 1878, Musée Magnin, Dijon.
- Covered Pot, etching, 1880, private collection.
- Bouquet of Carnations in a Porcelain Pitcher, oil on paper mounted on cardboard, Musée Magnin, Dijon.
- View of a Park, oil on canvas, Musée Magnin, Dijon.
- View of a Farm Entrance, oil, circa 1871, Musée Magnin, Dijon.
- Kitchen Utensils and Vegetables, oil, 1877, Musée Magnin, Dijon.
- Pink Geranium in a Glass, oil, Musée Magnin, Dijon.
