= Museum of Arts =

Museum of Arts or in French Musée des Arts is a museum dedicated to the arts. It may refer to:

== Museum of Arts ==
- Museum of Arts and Design, New York
- Dallas Museum of Art
- Saint Louis Art Museum

== Musée des Arts ==
- Musée des Arts Forains, Paris
- Musée des Arts et Métiers, Paris

== See also ==
- Museum of Fine Arts (disambiguation)
- Museum of Decorative Arts (disambiguation)
