= Rachid Khimoune =

French sculptor

Rachid Khimoune is a French sculptor of Algerian descent born on April 7, 1953, in Decazeville, Aveyron.

== Biography ==
His father came in France in 1946 from El Ksar in Kabylie, Algeria. Between 1970 and 1974, Rachid Khimoune studied at the École nationale supérieure des Beaux-Arts in Paris. Painter at first, he became a sculptor in the late 70s and early 80s. Since 1991, he lives with the journalist Ève Ruggiéri.

== Work ==
=== Exhibitions ===
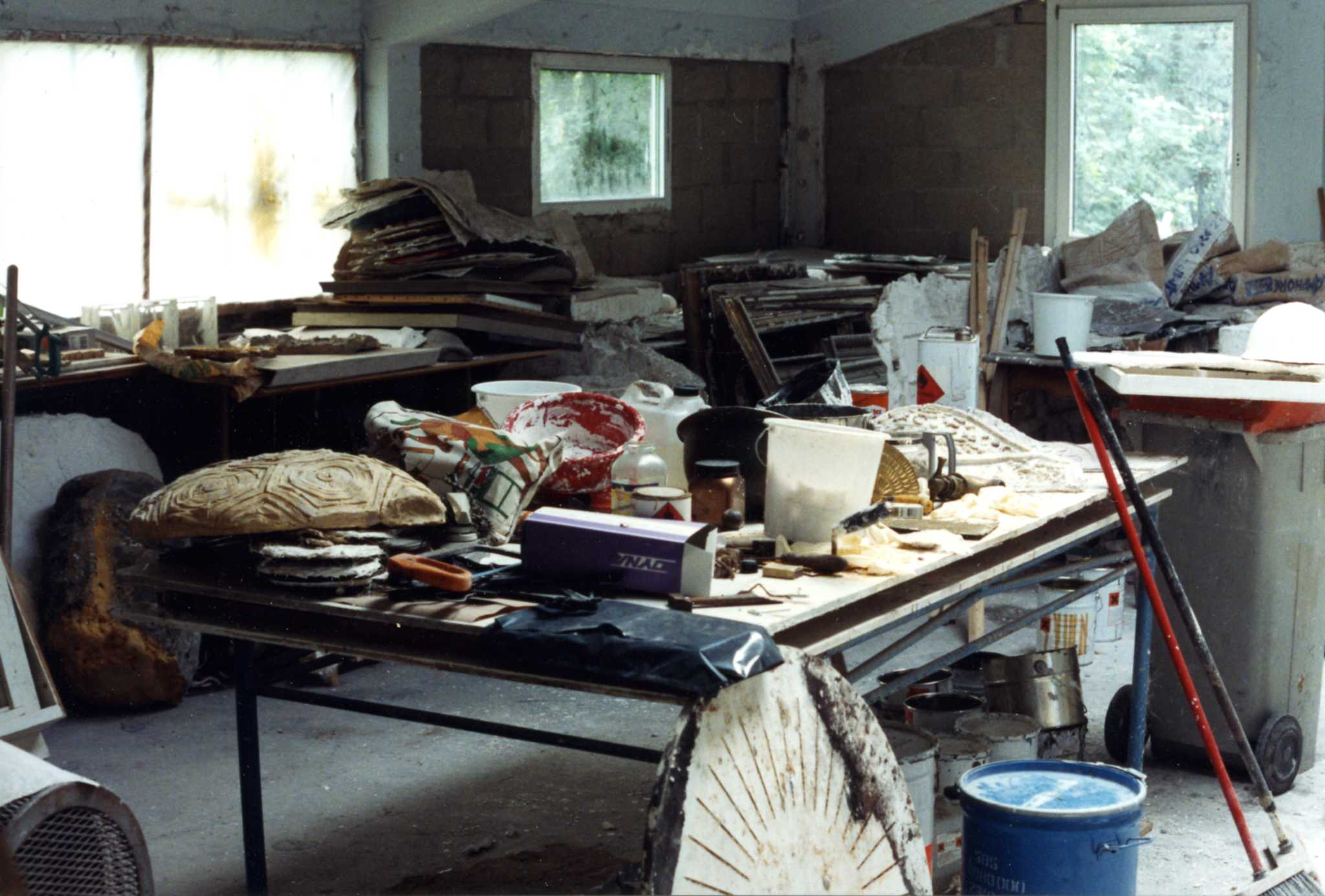
Workshop of Rachid Khimoune around 1987

- 1975 : Galerie Sanguine, Collioure
- 1977 : Georgetown University, Washington
- 1980 : Galerie Peinture Fraîche, Paris
- 1985 : Centre Culturel, Le Blanc Mesnil; Centre Culturel, Tulle; Centre d’action culturelle, Saint-Quentin-en-Yvelines
- 1986 : Les hommes-valises, Centre culturel algérien, Paris; Centre Jean Gagnant, Limoges; École des Beaux-Arts, Nancy.
- 1988 : Centre culturel, Neuchâtel (Suisse)
- 1989 : Galerie du Théâtre de l’Agora, Évry; Centre Jacques Prévert, Évry; Poissons-marelles, Galerie Art’O, Aubervilliers (poem of Tahar Djaout); Galerie Antoine de Galbert, Grenoble
- 1990 : Galerie Claudine Planque, Lausanne
- 1991 : Galerie Claude Monet, Bezons (poem of Bernard Rousseaux); Futur-composé, Collégiale Saint-André, Chartres et Galerie Daphné Behm Williamme, Chartres; Galerie Régine Deschênes, Paris; Château de Servière, Marseille
- 1992 : Ajuntament de Sabadell, Barcelone
- 1993 : Musée Picasso, Antibes; Galerie Anpire, Paris
- 1996 : Espace Pierre Cardin, Paris
- 1998 : Galerie de l’Europe, Paris.
- 2002 : Casa de Francia, Mexico
- 2003 : Grimaldi Forum, Monte Carlo (Monaco)
- 2006 : Galerie Samagra, Paris; Pavillon des Arts, Foire de Genève
- 2007 : Ancien Hôtel de Ville de Saint-Denis-de-La-Réunion
- 2007 : Bastide de Capelongue, Bonnieux
- 2007 : Galerie Meyer Le Bihan, Paris.
- 2008 : Maison Elsa Triolet - Aragon, Saint-Arnoult-en-Yvelines
- 2009 : Art Sawa Galerie, Dubai. United Arab Emirates
- 2010 : Maison de l'Afrique, Paris

=== Main sculptures ===
- 1985 : Relief, Espace Bonnefoix, Toulouse. Relief, Centre Culturel, Tulle. Les Enfants du Monde (The Children of the world), sculptures, Le Blanc-Mesnil.
- 1986 : Relief, Besançon. Relief, Fondation Danielle Mitterrand, New York. Don Quichotte and Sancho Pança, sculpture, Stains. Relief, Bureau de Poste, Limoges-Beaubreuil.
- 1987 : Relief, Pau. La Famille, relief, Hangzhou (China).
- 1988 : Les Guerriers, sculpture, Olympic Park, Seoul (Korea).
- 1989 : Les Quatre Mousquetaires, relief, Centre Jacques Prévert, Évry. Relief, Grenoble. Relief, Centre Culturel de La Madeleine, Évreux. Cheikh-speare, sculpture, Mantes-la-Jolie.
- 1993 : Les Enfants du Monde, Sculptures, Neuchâtel. Les Croisés, Chartres.
- 2001 : Les Enfants du Monde, 21 bronze sculptures installed on the terraces of the Parc de Bercy in Paris.
- 2003 : Sculpture Felipe le Mexicain, Musée d’histoire, Cuernavaca (Mexico).
- 2004 : Sculpture Jean-Baptiste le Monégasque, Monte-Carlo (Monaco).
- 2007 : Sculpture Naomi l'Africaine, Ouagadougou (Burkina Faso).
- 2007 : Relief Les Quatre Saisons, Villetaneuse.
- 2009 : El Mamoun le Marocain, Sculpture and drawing, Hôtel La Mamounia, Marrakech (Maroc).
- 2009 : Les Enfants du Monde, 21 bronze sculptures, American University, Abu Dhabi (UAE).
- 2010 : Les Enfants du Monde, 21 bronze sculptures, Expo 2010 à Shanghai (Chine).
- 2011 : 1000 Tortues-Casques, Parvis du Trocadéro, Paris (France).
- 2011 : 1000 Tortues-Casques, Normandy’s Omaha Beach for the 67th anniversary of D-Day landings.

== Bibliography ==
- Rachid K., Futur-composé, texts by Georges Lemoine, Daphné Behm-Williamme, François Maspéro, Bernard Rousseaux, collégiale St André and Galerie Daphné Behm Williamme, 1991.
- Rachid Khimoune, by Pierre Restany, Michel Archimbaud, François Maspéro, Musée Picasso, Antibes, 1993.
- Les effets du voyage, 25 artistes algériens, (by Fatma Zohra Zamoum, Ramon Tio Bellido, Michel-Georges Bernard and Malika Dorbani Bouabdellah), Palais des Congrès et de la Culture, Le Mans, December 1995.
- Les Enfants du monde, by Rachid Khimoune, texts by François Maspero, Pierre Restany, Tahar Djaout, Jean-Marie Gibbal and an interview with Michel Archimbaud. Pictures by Philippe Fuzeau; Paris-Musées, Somogy éditions d'art, 2001.

== See also ==
- Sculpture
