= Beaux Arts =

Beaux Arts, Beaux arts, or Beaux-Arts is a French term corresponding to fine arts in English. Capitalized, it may refer to:

- Académie des Beaux-Arts, a French arts institution (not a school)
- Académie Royale des Beaux-Arts, a Belgian arts school
- Beaux-Arts architecture, an architectural style
- Beaux Arts Gallery, a gallery of British modern art
- Beaux-Arts Institute of Design a.k.a. BAID, New York City based art and architecture school
- Beaux Arts Magazine, French magazine
- Beaux Arts Trio, a classical music chamber group
- Beaux Arts Village, Washington, a small town in the Seattle metropolitan area
- École des Beaux-Arts, several art schools in France
  - École nationale des beaux-arts de Lyon
  - École nationale supérieure des Beaux-Arts, Paris
- Fine art, a style of painting popular at the turn of the 19th and 20th century, the source of the generalized concept of "fine arts", i.e. art for art's sake
- Palais des Beaux Arts, a federal cultural venue in Brussels, Belgium

== See also ==
- Musée des Beaux Arts (disambiguation)
