= Église Notre-Dame-de-la-Nativité de Bercy =

Catholic church in Paris

Coordinates: 48°50′11″N 2°23′14″E

Notre-Dame-de-la-Nativité de Bercy
- Notre Dame de Bercy
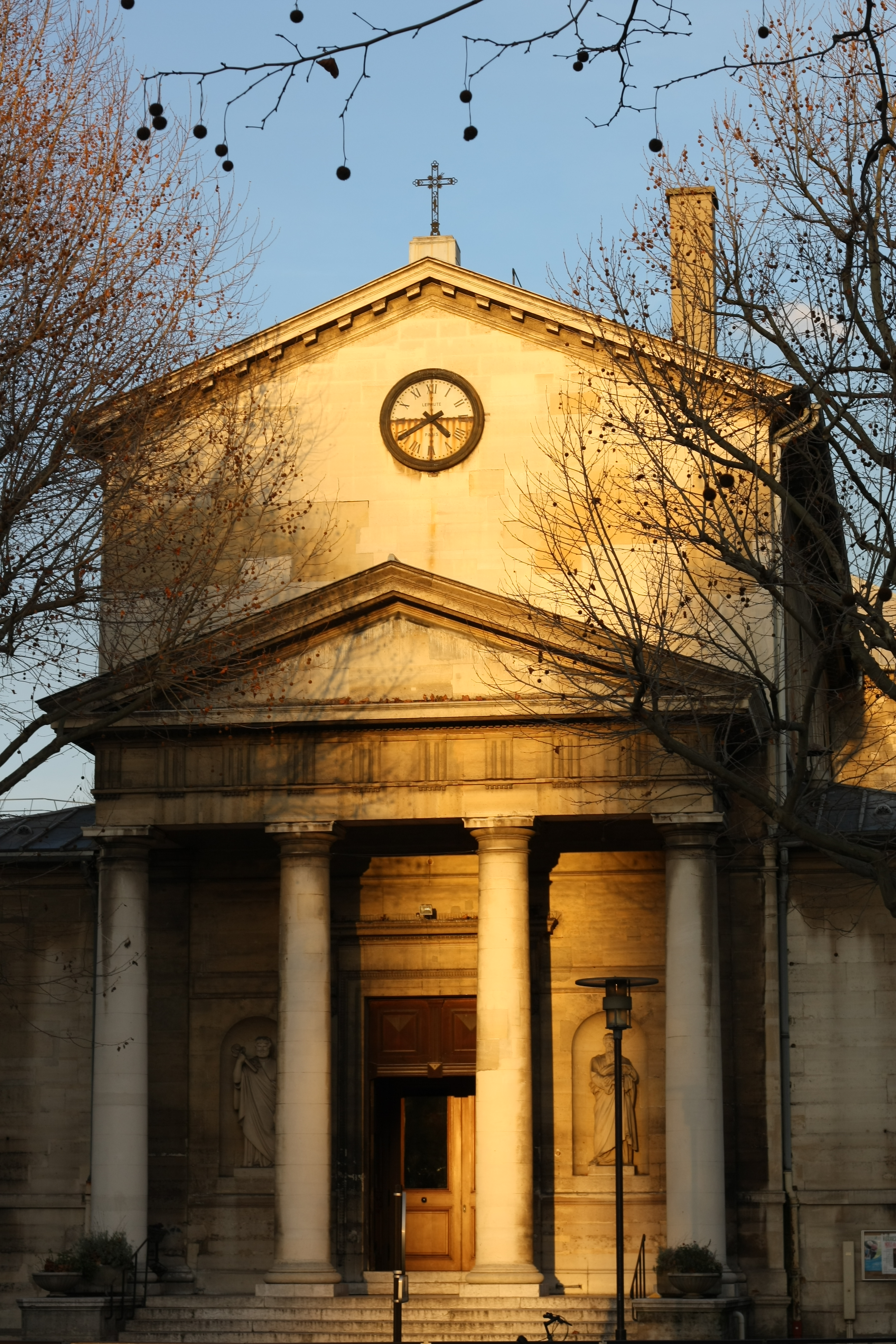
- South-facing façade
- Location: la place Lachambeaudie, 12th arrondissement, Paris
- Country: France
- Denomination: Roman Catholic
- Website: https://www.notredamedebercy.com

History
- Status: Active

Administration
- Archdiocese: Paris

The Notre-Dame-de-la-Nativité de Bercy church is a Catholic church located in the 12th arrondissement of Paris, in the Bercy district, on Place Lachambeaudie. It is also often called Notre-Dame de Bercy.

The responsibility for the parish has been entrusted by the Archbishop of Paris to the Emmanuel Community.

== History ==
Before the construction of the Notre-Dame-de-la-Nativité church in Bercy, the inhabitants of what was, at the time, the village of Bercy, were very far from their parish church - Église Sainte-Marguerite in the Faubourg Saint-Antoine. In 1677, the church was built by the religious order, les prêtres de la Doctrine-Chretienne (fathers of Christian doctrine), who gave it the name of Notre-Dame-de-Bon-Secours. This church became a parish church in 1790, following the creation of the commune of Bercy.

It was demolished in 1821 because it was almost in ruins, but was rebuilt in the following years (the first stone was placed on 8 June 1823) by the architect André Chatillon. It was consecrated in 1826 with the name of Our Lady of the Nativity. The church was a central element of the community of merchants and workers operating the wine warehouses of Bercy.

In May 1871, the church was destroyed again during the uprising of the Paris Commune, along with the first Town Hall of the twelfth arrondissement. It is the only Parisian church to suffer this fate. The church was then rebuilt to an identical plan by the architect Antoine-Julien Hénard, who also rebuilt the 12th arrondissement's town hall.

The church was completely inundated during the Seine flood of 1910.

In April 1944, during the Second World War, the church was damaged by the bombardment of the nearby railway tracks of Gare de Lyon.

In 1982, a fire destroyed the first bench, a crucifix and part of the floor. It was restored in 1985.

The church was listed as a historical monument in 1982.

== Exterior ==
The architecture of the church is modeled on ancient Roman basilicas.

The church has a main nave and two side naves with slightly projecting transepts. Its style, sober and solid, is distinguished by a porch of classical style, with pediment and columns, and by an apse decorated on the outside with Byzantine-inspired motifs.

The two sculptures on the facade are of Saint Peter and Saint Paul. Saint Peter is on the left and his statue is attributed Jean Valette. The statue of Saint Paul is attributed to Louis Auguste Roubaud.

== Interior ==
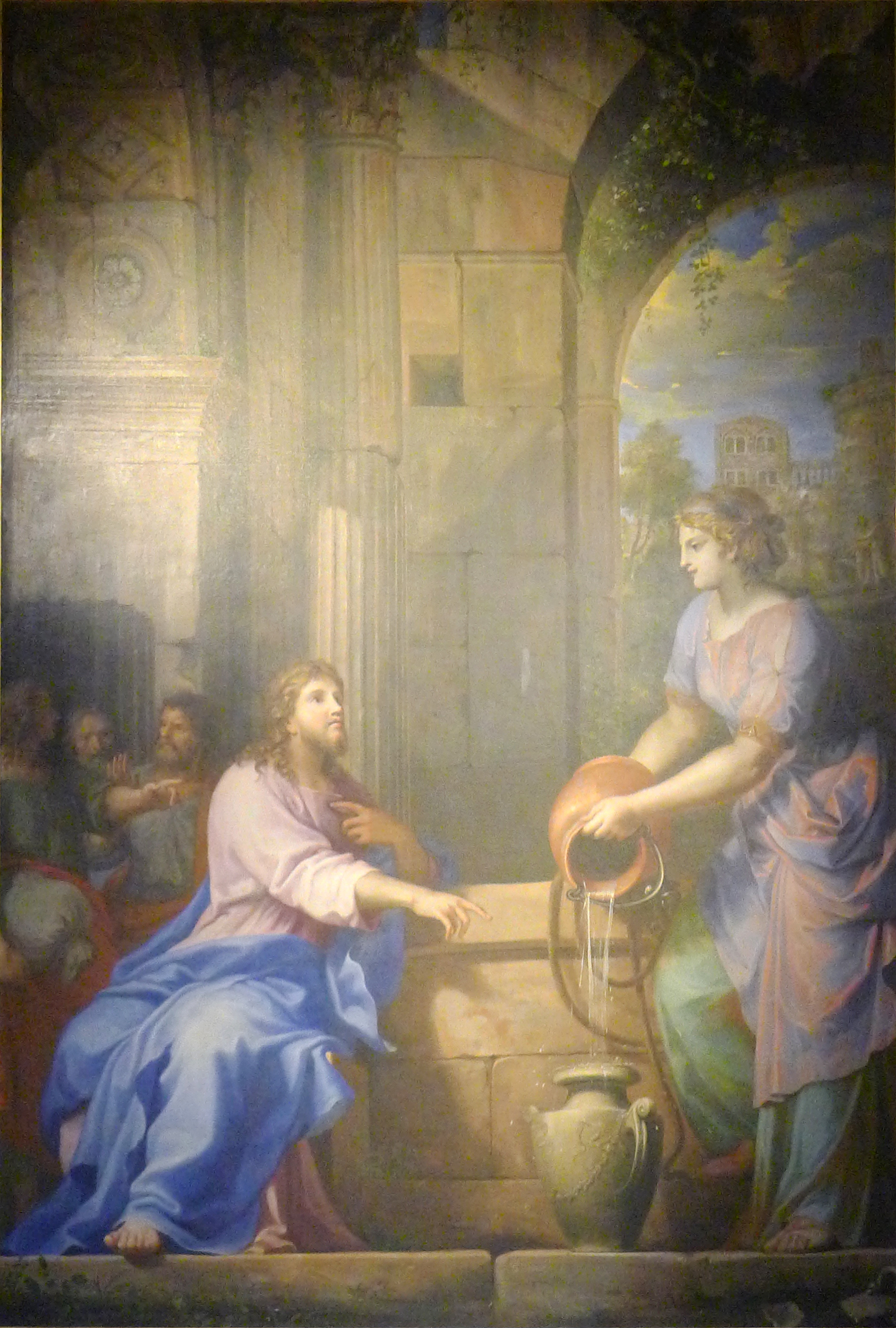
Jesus and the Samaratain

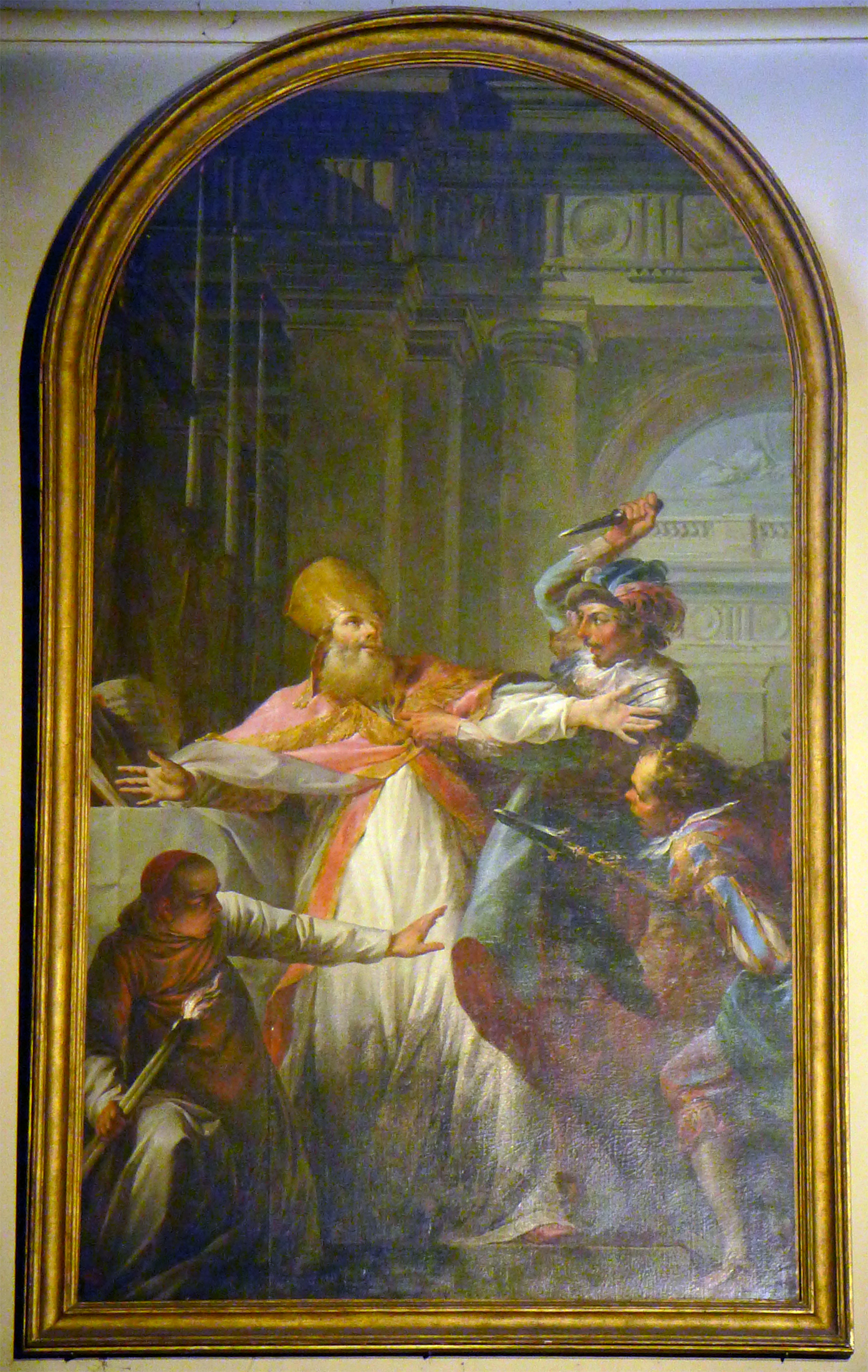
The Assassination of Thomas Becket

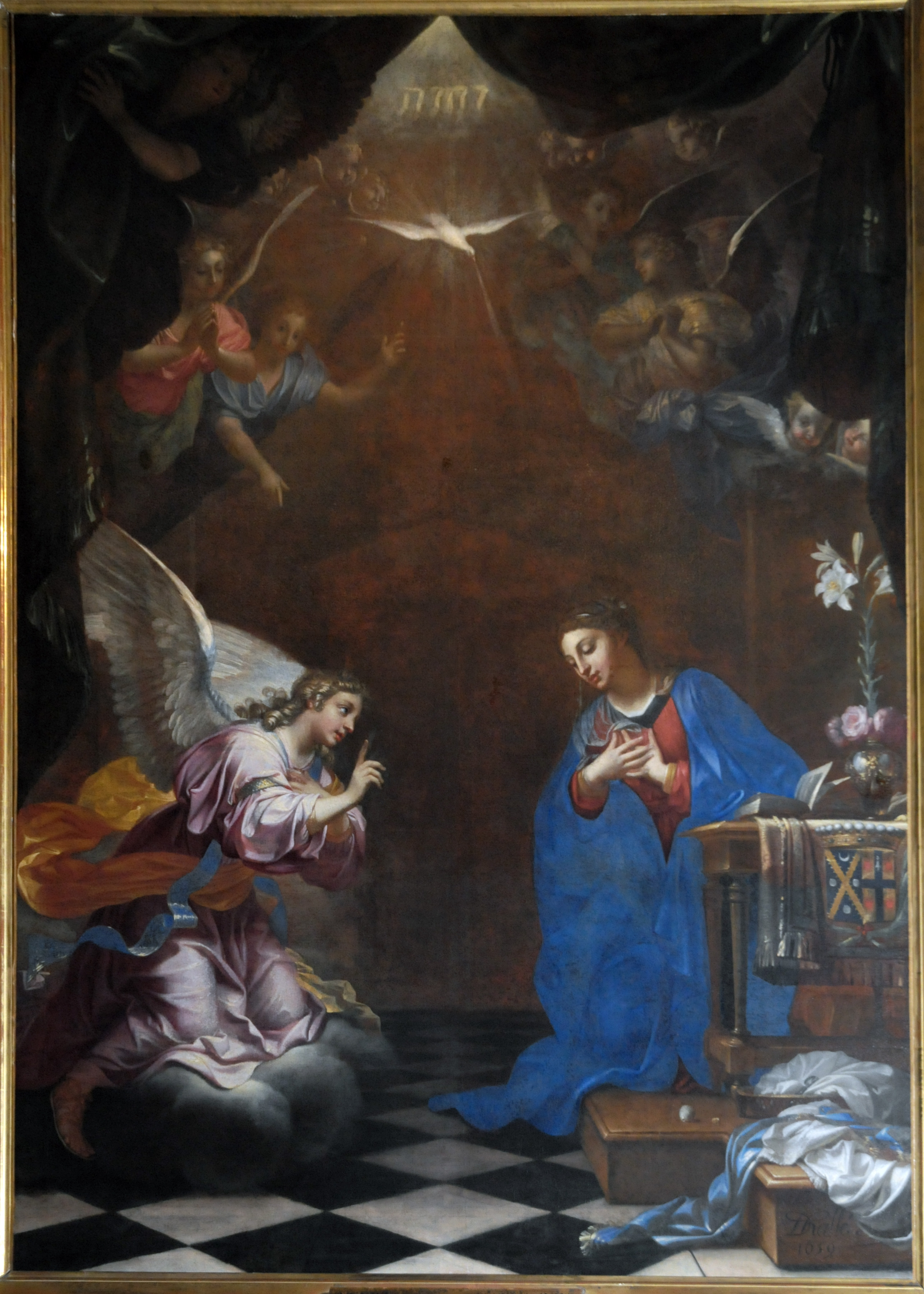
The Annunciation

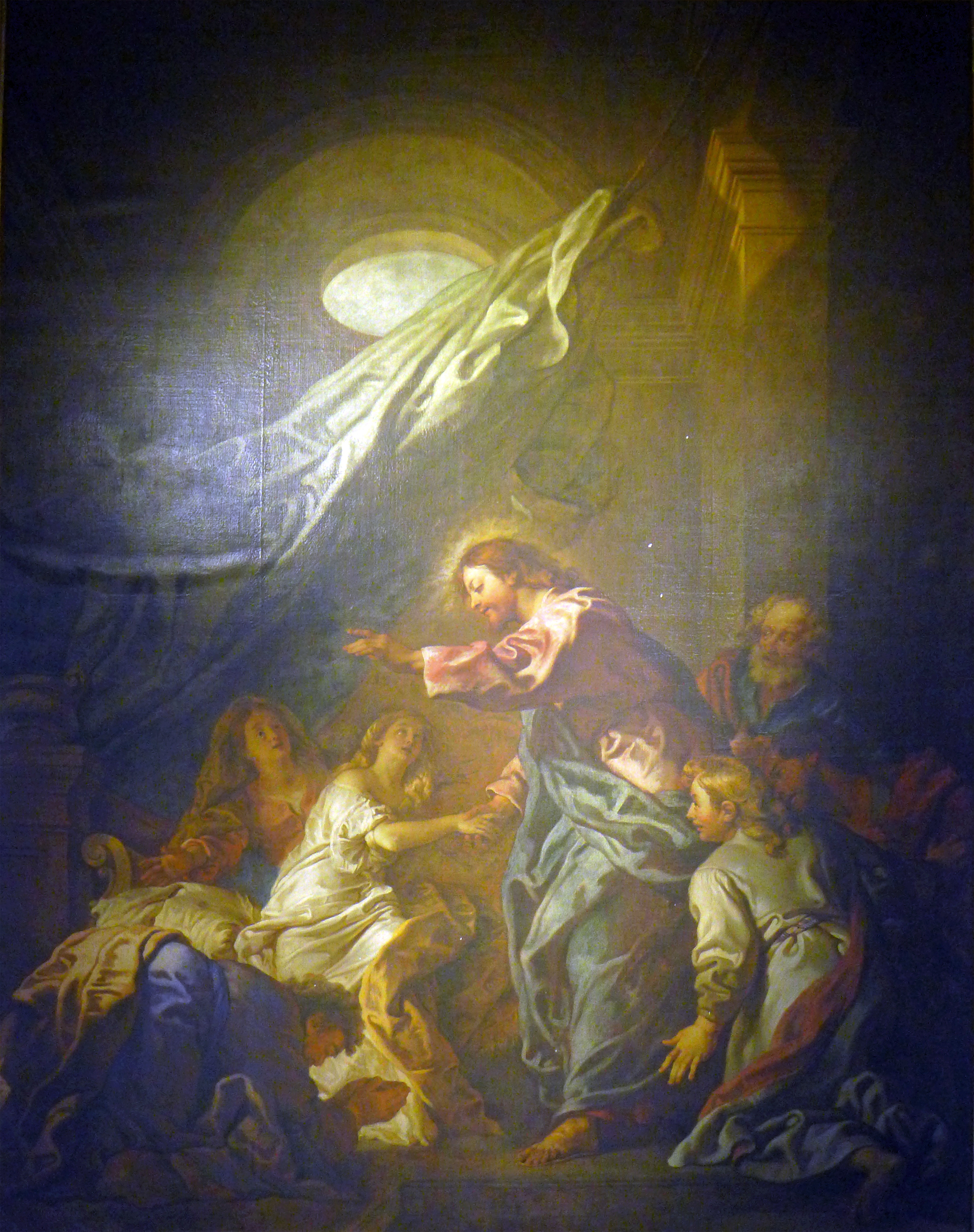
Jairus' Daughter is Raised from the Dead

The church has a remarkable collection of religious paintings from the 17th and 18th centuries, including:

- Jesus and the Samaritan Woman (Jacques Stella, c.1640-1645);
- The Nativity (17th Century Flemish School);
- The Assassination of Saint Thomas Becket (Jean Baptiste-Marie Pierre, 1748);
- The Annunciation (Daniel Hallé, 1659), a work donated by the city of Paris in 1877;
- The Resurrection of Jairus' Daughter (Charles de La Fosse, circa 1680)

A small statue of the monk Émilion de Combes, patron saint of wine merchants, is also on display, as the church is located in the district of wine warehouses of Bercy.

A contemporary painting, Divine Light (Annunciation), located in front of the choir, is a work by Monique Baroni (1930–2016). A tin foil sculpture represents the Good Thief. It is the work of Michel Laude and dates from 1996.

The organ was built by the brothers Stolz & Frères, sons of Jean-Baptiste Stoltz, around 1880. It consists of two keyboards with mechanical action and thirteen stops.

== See also ==
- List of historic churches in Paris
