= Pierre Magnin =

French politician (1824–1910)

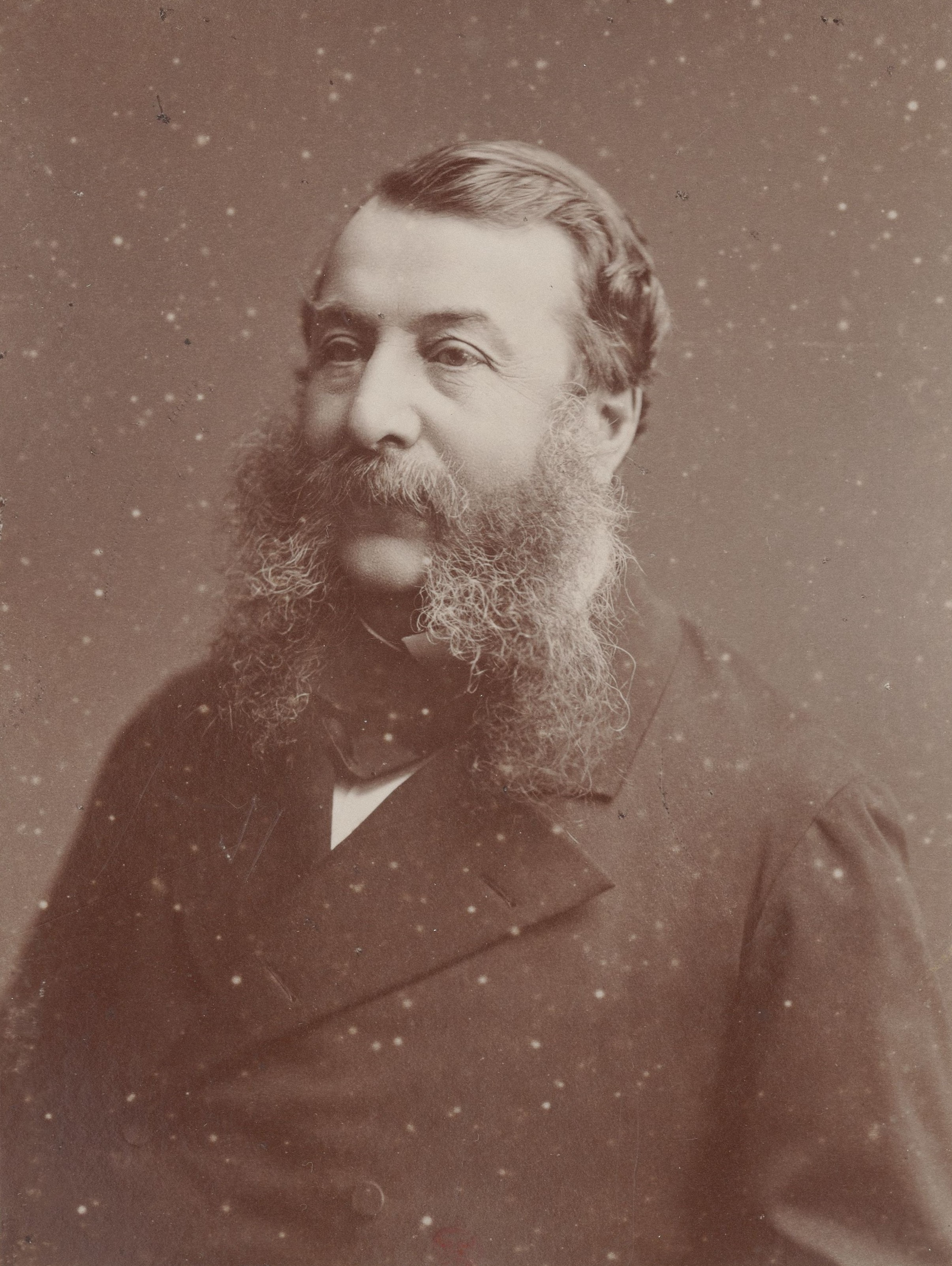

Pierre Magnin (1 January 1824 – 22 November 1910) was a French politician of the Second French Empire and French Third Republic. He was born in Dijon, France. He was a member of the Chamber of Deputies of France from 1863 to 1870. He was a member of the National Assembly of 1871 from 1871 to 1875. He was a member of the Senate of France from 1875 until his death. He was governor of the Banque de France from 1881 to 1897. He was minister of agriculture and commerce (4 September 1870 – 18 February 1871). He was minister of finance (28 December 1879 – 13 November 1881) in the governments of Charles de Freycinet and Jules Ferry. He died in Paris. Jeanne Magnin is his daughter.

== Sources ==
- "Pierre Magnin", in Adolphe Robert and Gaston Cougny, Dictionnaire des parlementaires français (1789–1891), Bourloton, Paris, 1889 Edition details Wikisource
