= Museum of Fine Art =

Museum of Fine Art may refer to:

== United States ==
- Boston Museum of Fine Art, Boston, Massachusetts
- Brownsville Museum of Fine Art, Brownsville, Texas
- Dennos Museum Center, Traverse City, Michigan
- El Paso Museum of Fine Art, El Paso, Texas
- Jule Collins Smith Museum of Fine Art, Auburn, Alabama
- Kirkland Museum of Fine & Decorative Art, an art museum in Denver, Colorado
- Madison Museum of Fine Art, Madison, Georgia
- Museum of Fine Arts, Houston, Texas
- Pennsylvania Academy of Fine Art, Philadelphia, Pennsylvania
- Southern Nevada Museum of Fine Art, Las Vegas, Nevada
- Zimmerli Museum of Fine Art, New Brunswick, New Jersey

== Other countries ==
- Fine Art and Ceramic Museum, Jakarta, Indonesia
- Irbit State Museum of Fine Art, Russia
- Liechtenstein Museum of Fine Art, Vaduz, Liechtenstein
- Juan Carlos Castagnino Municipal Museum of Art, Mar del Plata, Argentina
- Montreal Museum of Fine Art, Montreal, Quebec, Canada
- Museum of Fine Art, Chandigarh, India
- Tigre Municipal Museum of Fine Art, Tigre, Argentia

== See also ==
- Museum of Fine Arts (disambiguation)
- Art museum
