= Museum of Decorative Arts =

Museum of Decorative Arts or Decorative Arts Museum or in French Musée des Arts Décoratifs are museums which present collections of Decorative Arts. There are numerous museums:

== Non-exhaustive list of Decorative Arts Museums ==
=== Europe ===
- Musée des Arts Décoratifs, Paris, France
- Musée des Arts Décoratifs et du Design, Bordeaux, France
- Musée des Arts décoratifs, Strasbourg, France
- Musée des Tissus et des Arts décoratifs, Lyon, France
- Latvian Museum of Decorative Arts and Design, Riga, Latvia
- Museum of Decorative Arts, Berlin (Kunstgewerbemuseum Berlin), Germany
- Museum of Decorative Arts in Prague (Uměleckoprůmyslové museum v Praze), Czech Republic
- National Museum of Ireland – Decorative Arts and History, Dublin, Ireland
- Norwegian Museum of Decorative Arts and Design, Oslo, Norway

=== North America ===
- DeWitt Wallace Decorative Arts Museum, Williamsburg, Virginia
- Kirkland Museum of Fine & Decorative Art, Denver, Colorado
- Villa Terrace Decorative Arts Museum, Milwaukee, Wisconsin

=== South America ===
- Firma y Odilo Estévez Municipal Decorative Art Museum, Rosario, Argentina
- National Museum of Decorative Arts, Buenos Aires, Argentina
- Museum of Decorative Arts, Havana (Museo de Artes Decorativas), Cuba

== See also ==
- Museum of Arts (disambiguation)
- Boncompagni Ludovisi Decorative Art Museum, Rome, Italy
- Danish Museum of Art & Design (formerly Danish Museum of Decorative Art), Copenhagen, Denmark
- Les Arts Décoratifs, Paris, France
