= Museum of Fine Arts =

Museum of Fine Arts (French: Musée des Beaux-Arts; German: Museum der bildenden Künste) may refer to:

== Asia ==
=== Japan ===
- Museum of Fine Arts, Gifu, Japan

=== Philippines ===
- National Museum of Fine Arts (Manila)

=== Taiwan ===
- Kaohsiung Museum of Fine Arts, Kaohsiung
- National Taiwan Museum of Fine Arts, Taichung
- Kuandu Museum of Fine Arts, Taipei
- Lingnan Fine Arts Museum, Taipei
- Taipei Fine Arts Museum, Taipei

== Europe ==
=== Austria ===
- Kunsthistorisches Museum, Vienna

=== Belgium ===
- Royal Museums of Fine Arts of Belgium, Brussels
- Museum of Fine Arts, Antwerp
- Museum of Fine Arts, Ghent
- Museum of Fine Arts, Ostend
- Musée des Beaux-Arts Tournai

=== France ===
- Musée des Beaux-arts et de la Dentelle d'Alençon
- Musée des Beaux-Arts d'Angers
- Musée des Beaux-Arts et d'Archéologie de Besançon
- Musée des Beaux-Arts de Bordeaux
- Musée des Beaux-Arts de Brest
- Musée des Beaux-Arts de Caen
- Musée des Beaux-Arts et d'Archéologie de Châlons-en-Champagne
- Musée des Beaux-Arts de Chambéry
- Musée des Beaux-Arts de Dijon
- Musée des Beaux-Arts de Dole
- Museum of Grenoble
- Musée des Beaux-Arts de La Rochelle, La Rochelle
- Musée des Beaux-Arts de Lille
- Museum of Fine Arts of Lyon
- Musée des beaux-arts de Marseille
- Musée des Beaux-Arts de Morlaix
- Musée des Beaux-Arts de Mulhouse
- Museum of Fine Arts of Nancy
- Musée d'Arts de Nantes (formerly the Musée des Beaux-Arts de Nantes)
- Musée des Beaux-Arts de Nice
- Musée des Beaux-Arts de Nîmes
- Musée des Beaux-Arts d'Orléans
- Petit Palais (Musée des Beaux-Arts de la Ville de Paris)
- Musée des Beaux-Arts de Pau
- Musée des Beaux-Arts de Pont-Aven
- Musée des Beaux-Arts de Quimper
- Musée des Beaux-Arts de Rennes
- Museum of Fine Arts, Rheims
- Musée des Beaux-Arts de Rouen
- Musée des Beaux-Arts de Strasbourg
- Musée des Beaux-Arts de Tours
- Musée des Beaux-Arts de Valenciennes

=== Germany ===
- Museum der bildenden Künste, Leipzig

=== Hungary ===
- Museum of Fine Arts (Budapest), Hungary

=== Malta ===
- National Museum of Art (MUZA), Valletta.

=== Russia ===
- Pushkin Museum (Pushkin Museum of Fine Arts), Moscow

=== Spain ===
- Museo de Bellas Artes de Álava
- Museo de Bellas Artes de Asturias
- Museo de Bellas Artes de Badajoz
- Museo de Bellas Artes de Barcelona
- Museo de Bellas Artes de Bilbao
- Museo de Bellas Artes de Castellón
- Museo de Bellas Artes de Córdoba
- Museo de Bellas Artes de Granada
- Museo de Bellas Artes Gravina, Alicante
- Museo de Bellas Artes de Málaga
- Museo de Bellas Artes de Murcia
- Museo de Bellas Artes de Santa Cruz de Tenerife.
- Museo de Bellas Artes de Sevilla
- Museo de Bellas Artes de Valencia

=== Switzerland ===
- Museum of Fine Arts Bern
- Museum of Fine Arts Le Locle

=== Ukraine ===
- Odesa Fine Arts Museum

== North America ==
=== Canada ===
- Montreal Museum of Fine Arts, Montreal
- National Gallery of Canada (Musée des beaux-arts du Canada), Ottawa
- Musée national des beaux-arts du Québec (The Quebec National Museum of Fine Art), Quebec City

=== Cuba ===
- Museo Nacional de Bellas Artes de La Habana, Old Habana

=== Mexico ===
- Museo de Arte Moderno, Mexico City
- Palacio de Bellas Artes, Mexico City

=== United States ===
- Museum of Fine Arts, St. Petersburg, Florida
- Museum of Fine Arts, Boston, Massachusetts
- Michele and Donald D'Amour Museum of Fine Arts, Springfield, Massachusetts
- New Mexico Museum of Art (formerly the Museum of Fine Arts)
- Museum of Fine Arts, Houston, Texas

== South America ==
=== Argentina ===
- Museo Nacional de Bellas Artes (Buenos Aires)

=== Brazil ===
- Museu Nacional de Belas Artes, Rio de Janeiro

=== Chile ===
- Chilean National Museum of Fine Arts, Santiago

=== Venezuela ===
- Museo de Bellas Artes (Caracas)

== Other uses ==
- "Musée des Beaux Arts" (poem), by W. H. Auden

== See also ==
- Museum of Arts (disambiguation)
- Museum of Fine Art (disambiguation)
- Museum of Fine Arts railway station
