= Museum of Fine Arts station =

Museum of Fine Arts station can refer to the following stations:

- Museum of Fine Arts station (MBTA), a light rail stop in Boston, Massachusetts
- Museum of Fine Arts railway station (Taiwan), a train station in Gushan, Kaohsiung
