= Musée des Arts Forains =

Museum in Paris, France

- Musée des Arts Forains
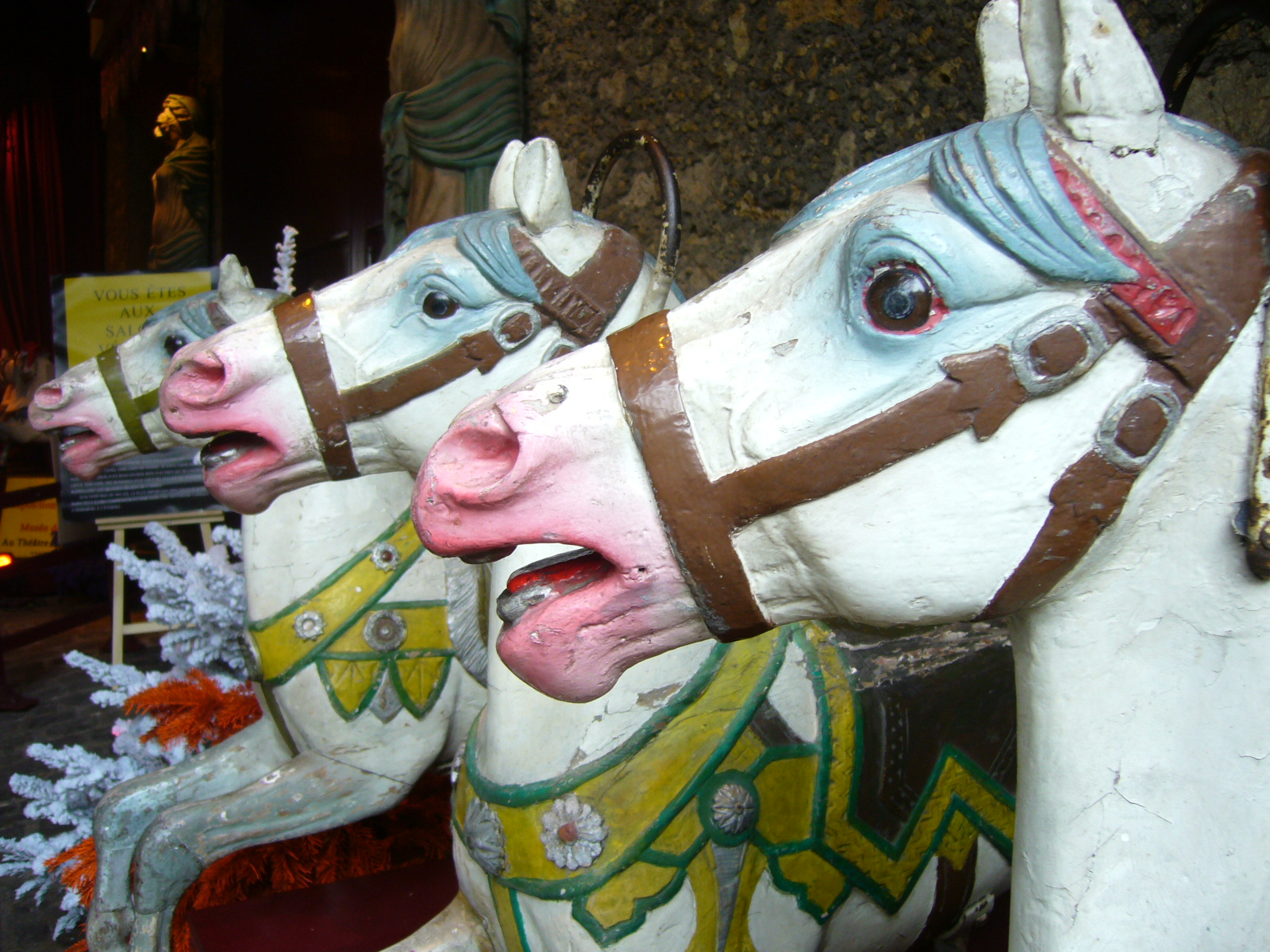
- Established: 1996
- Location: Paris, France
- Coordinates: 48.833056°N 2.388889°E
- Collection size: Amusement rides
- Website: http://arts-forains.com/en

The Musée des Arts Forains (French pronunciation: [myze dez‿aʁ fɔʁɛ̃], Fairground Museum) is a private museum of funfair and fairground objects located within the Pavillons de Bercy in the 12th arrondissement of Paris at 53, avenue des Terroirs de France, Paris, France. It is open to the public by prior reservation.

== History ==
The museum occupies a structure that was once part of the wine warehouses of Bercy, a commercial district that was once the largest wine market in the world. The museum was created by Jean Paul Favand, an actor and antiques dealer, from his private collection. It opened to the public in 1996, and now contains a variety of objects dating between 1850 and 1950 including 14 amusement rides, 16 fair stalls and restored attractions, 18 sets of historical works, and 1522 independent works. The collections include merry-go-rounds and carousels, German swings, hundred-year-old bicycles, Japanese billiards, a Parisian Waiter Race and a Hooghuys Organ, and the grand vizier Ali Pasha.

In 2009, the Musée des arts forains was listed as a Living Heritage Company.

== Permanent collection ==
The museum is a place of 11,400 m2. The permanent collection is composed of three thematic rooms (covering about 2000 square meters each): "The Venetian Lounges" (Les Salons Vénitiens), "The Theatre of Marvels" (Le Théâtre du Merveilleux) and "The Fairground Art Museum" (Le Musée des Arts Forains). Mainly used for corporate events, the museum is also open to individual visitors (by reservation only).

- The Theatre of Marvels: A glimpse into the biggest world fairs of the beginning of the 20th century (especially Paris' Exposition Universelle (1900)). An automatic orchestra (controlled by computer) audiovisual displays form a part of the attractions – thanks to 12 projectors, the walls metamorphose into Captain Nemo's Nautilus submarine, or a coral reef.
- The Venetian Lounges: Visitors can watch an Italian opera-based show, performed by automata in a typical Venetian setting, or go for a ride on a gondola merry-go-round.
- The Fairground Art Museum: A special tribute to the 19th-century funfair – ride a bicycle merry-go-round or play at a Parisian Waiters' Race stand.

== See also ==
- List of museums in Paris
- Les Pavillons de Bercy
- L'Internaute article
- Paris.org entry

== Gallery ==
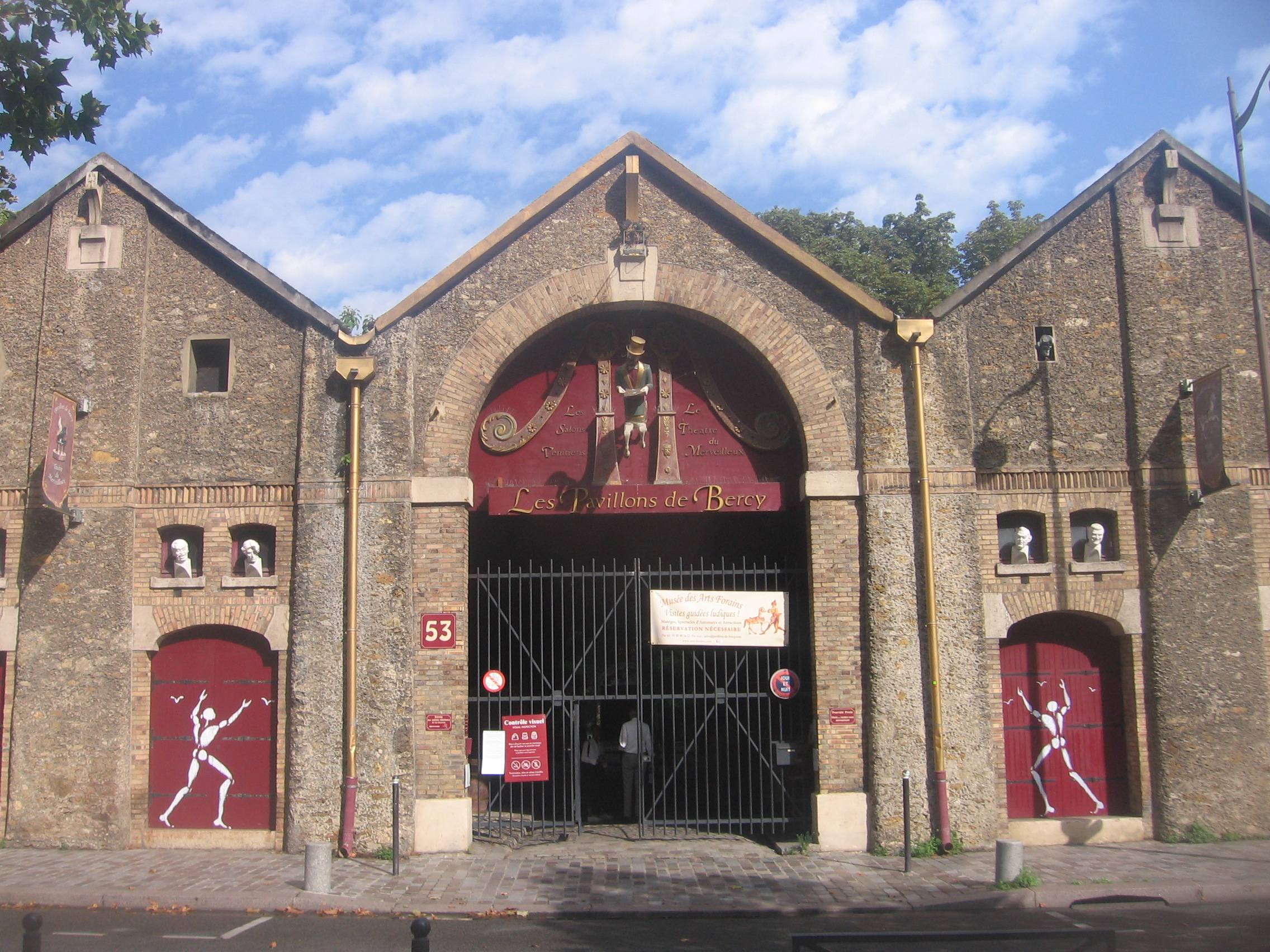

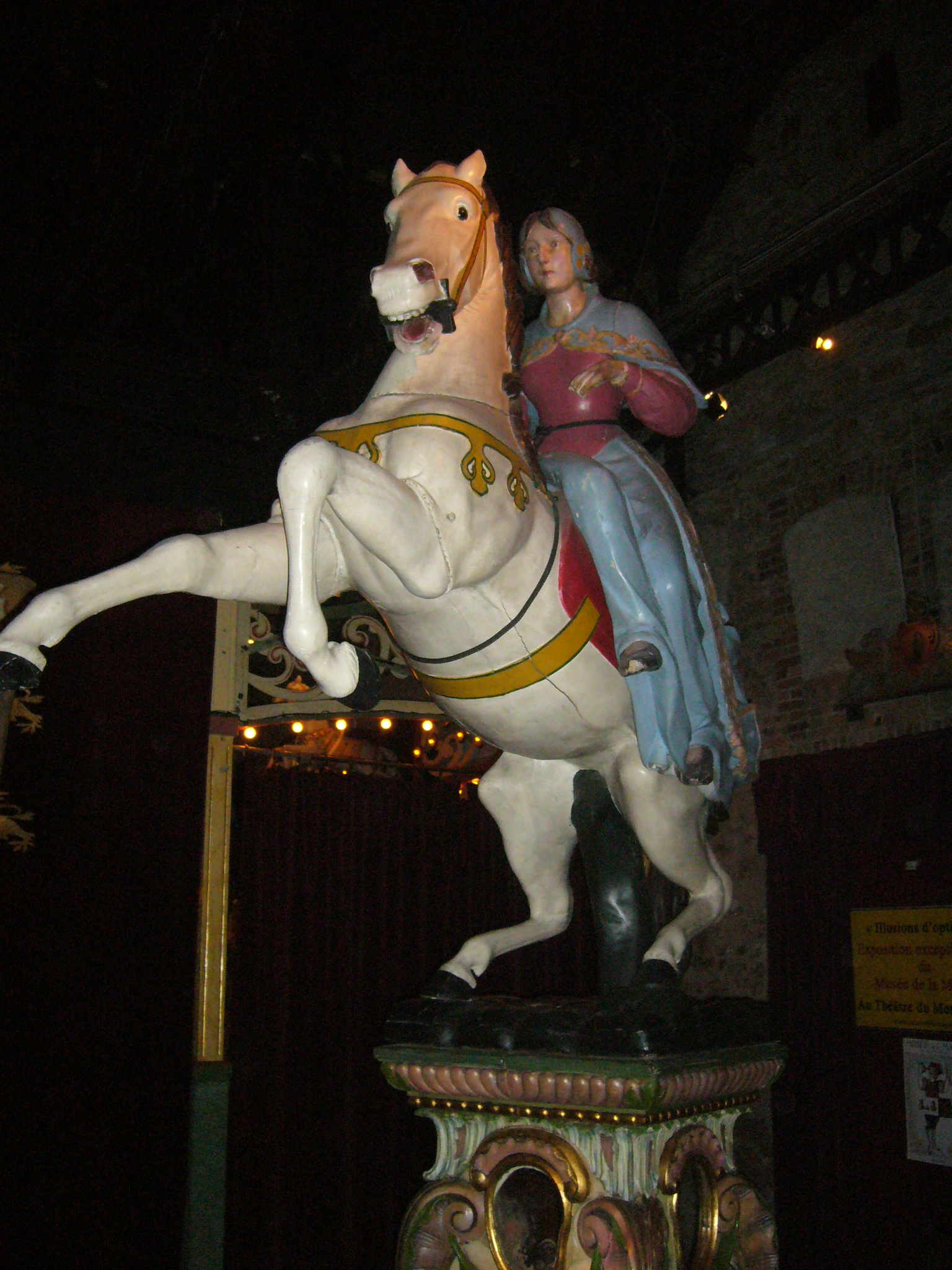

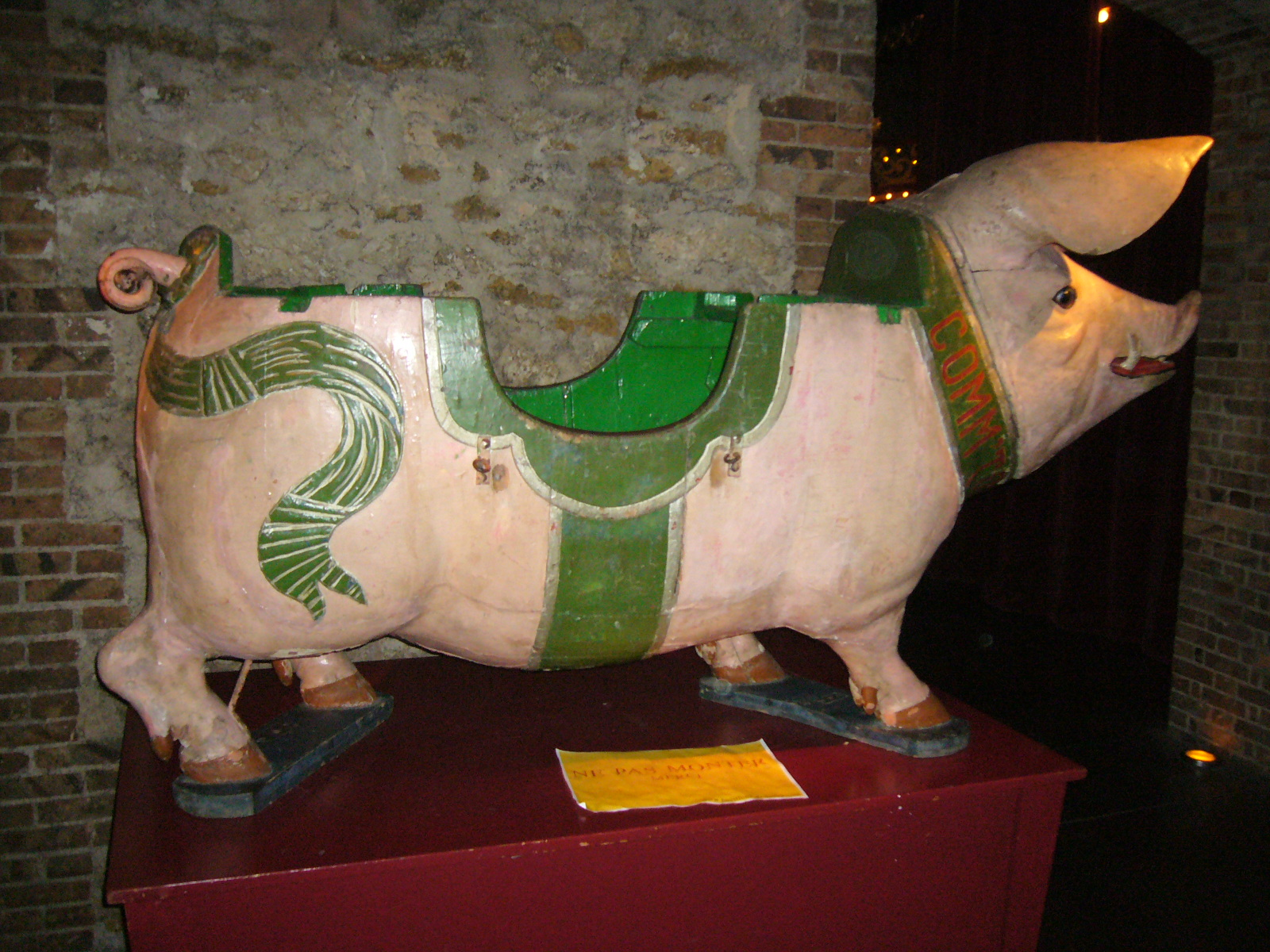

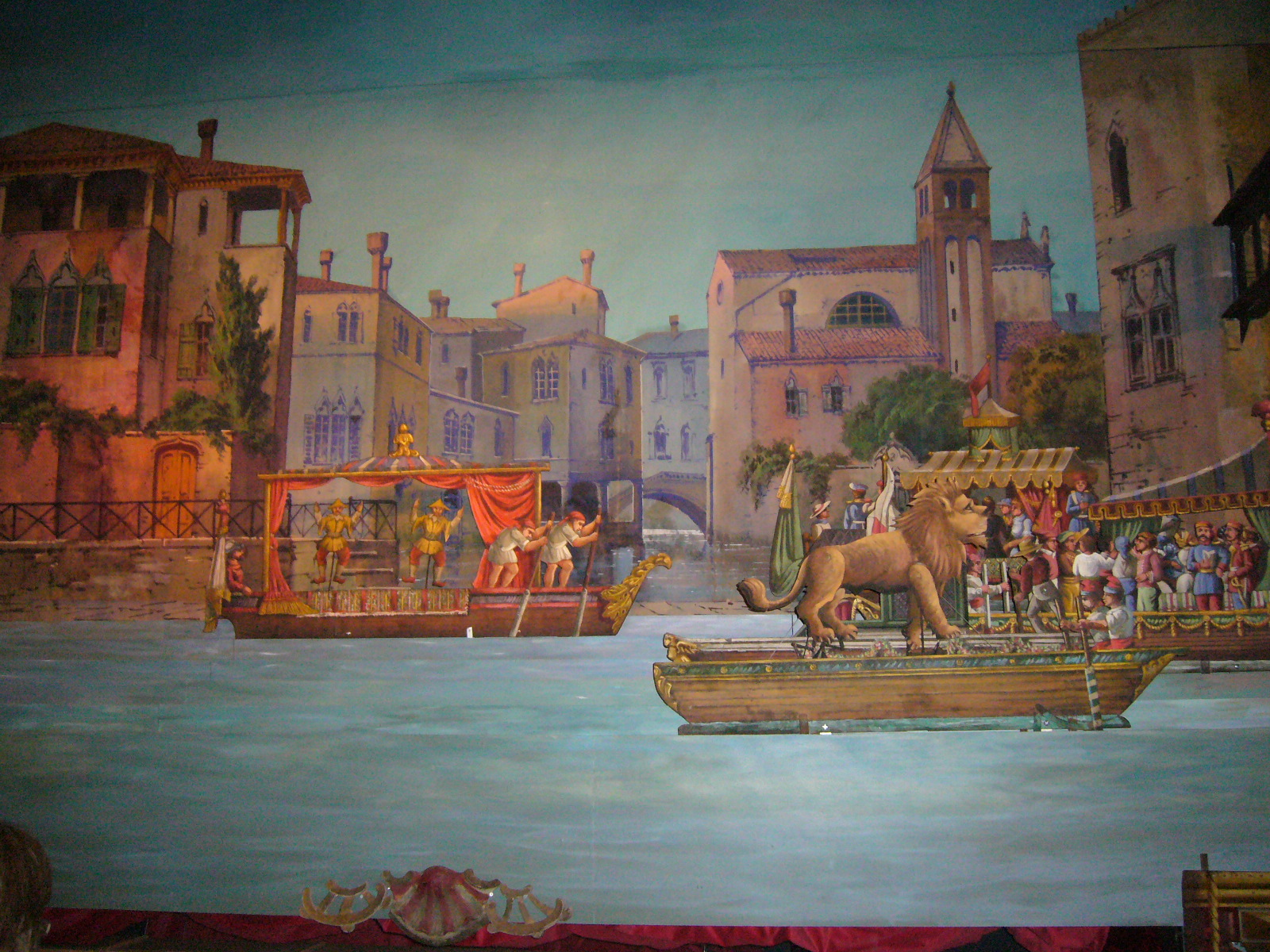

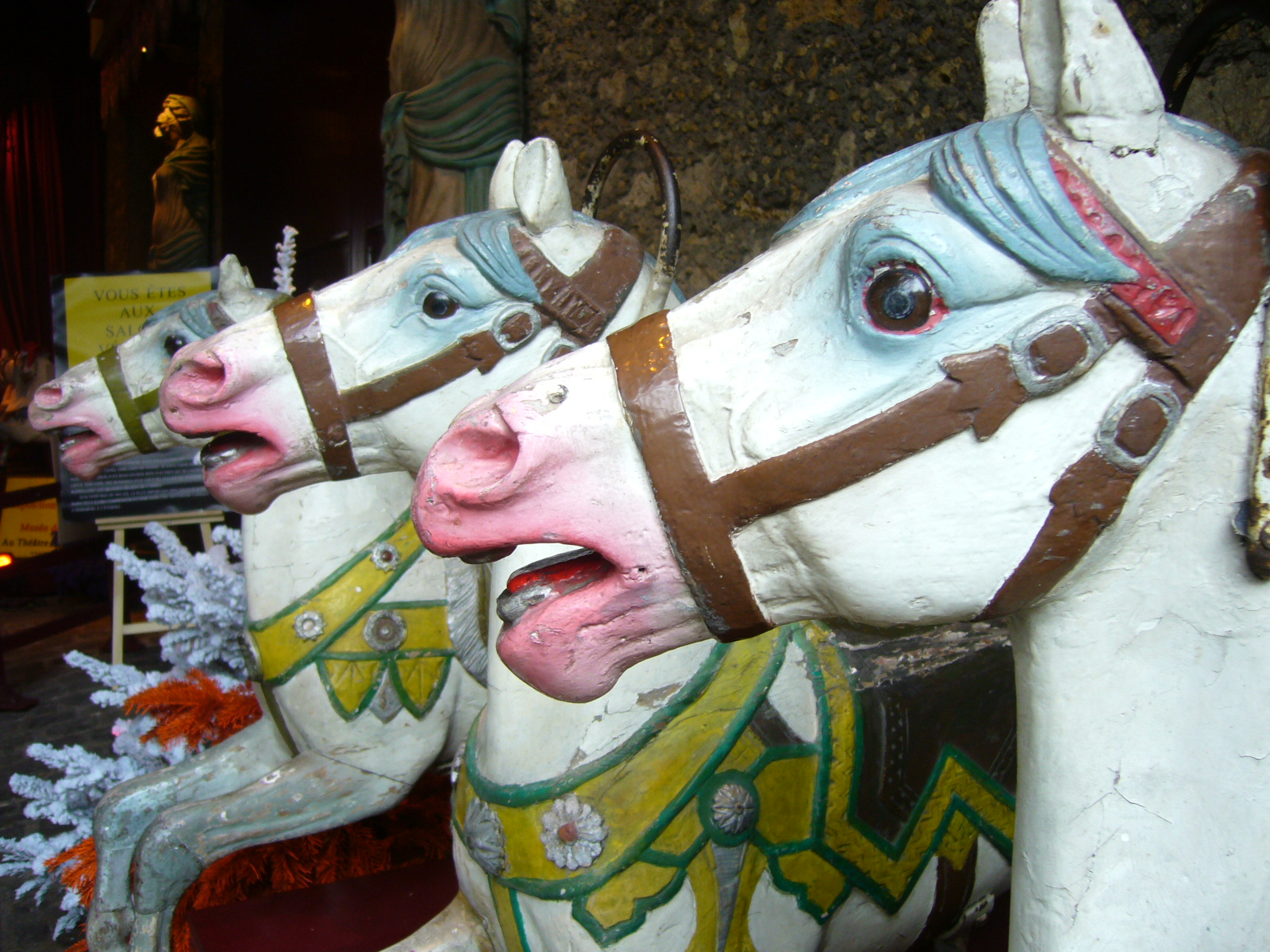

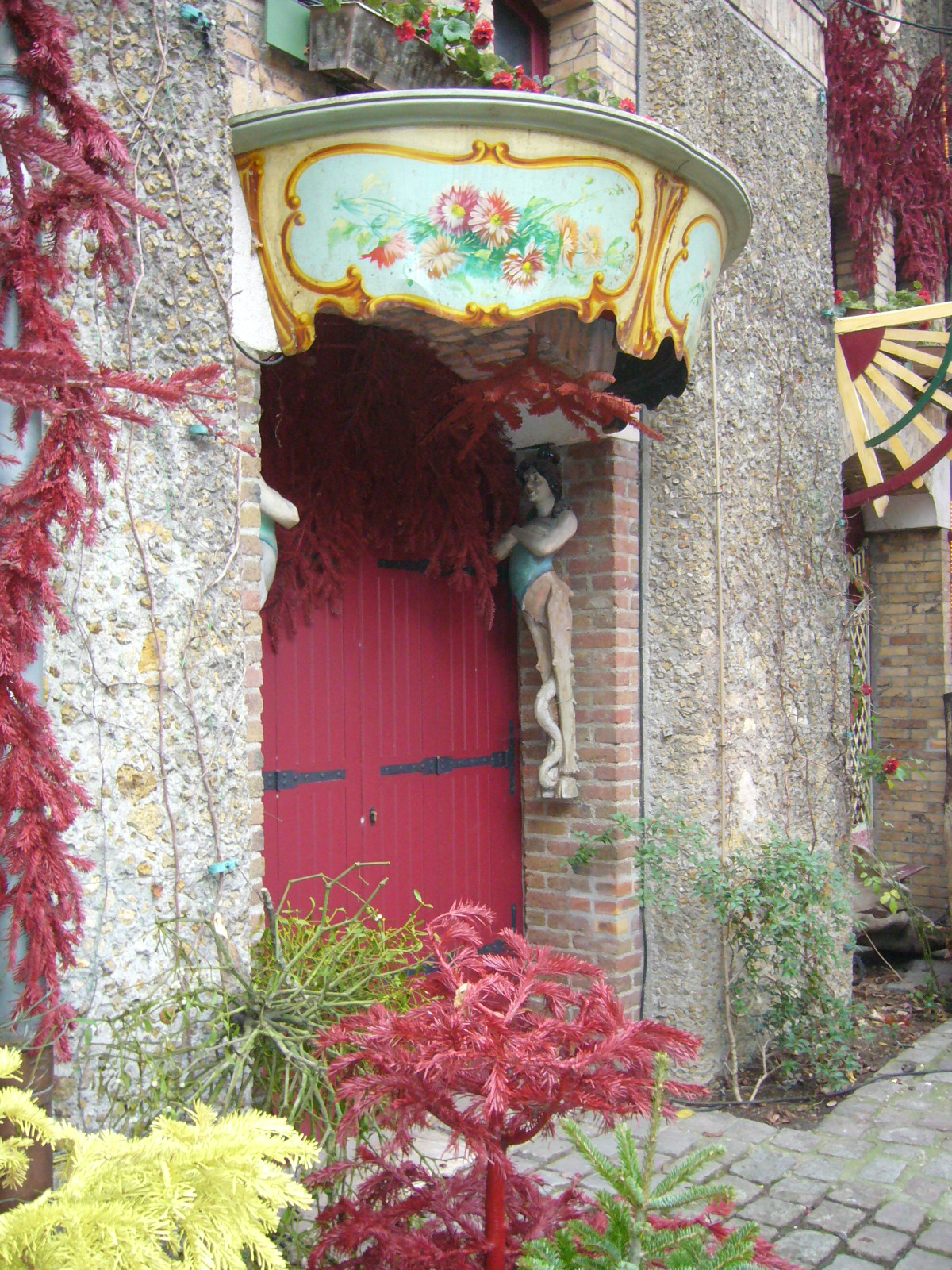
