= Dar El Beïda (disambiguation) =

Dar El Beïda or Dar al-Baida (الدار البيضاء, "the White House") may refer to:

== Places ==
=== Algeria ===
- Dar El Beïda, a municipality in Algiers Province
  - Dar El Beïda District, the administrative district of which it is the seat
  - Houari Boumediene Airport, formerly known as Maison Blanche Airport and later Dar El Beïda Airport
  - Dar El Beïda railway station, a station serving the airport and the municipality

=== Morocco ===
- Casablanca, the largest city in Morocco, whose Arabic name is Dar El Beïda
  - Grand Casablanca, a former administrative region
  - Casablanca Prefecture, an administrative subdivision
  - Port of Casablanca
  - Casablanca–Anfa Airport
- Dar el-Beida Palace, an 18th-century palace located in Fez

=== Saudi Arabia ===
- Dar Al Baida, Taif, a settlement in Taif Governorate
- Dar Al Baida, Ranyah, a settlement in Ranyah Governorate

=== Yemen ===
- Dar Al Baida, Al Udayn, a village in Al Udayn District
- Dar Al Baida, Sanaa, a neighborhood in Sanaa
- Dar Al Baida, Bilad Ar Rus, a village in Bilad Ar Rus District

== See also ==
- Casablanca (disambiguation)
- Maison Blanche (disambiguation)
- White House (disambiguation)
