= Casa Branca =

Casa Branca or Casabranca (Portuguese for "White House") may refer to:

- Casa Branca, São Paulo
- Casa Branca, Sousel
- Casa Branca do Engenho Velho, a Canbomblé temple in Salvador, Brazil
- Casabranca in Guangdong, China, a former name of Qianshan
- Casabranca in Morocco, a former name of Casablanca

== See also ==
- Casablanca (disambiguation)
- White House (disambiguation)
