= Hôpital Bicêtre station =

Paris Metro station in Le Kremlin-Bicêtre

Kremlin-Bicêtre–Gentilly Hôpital Bicêtre
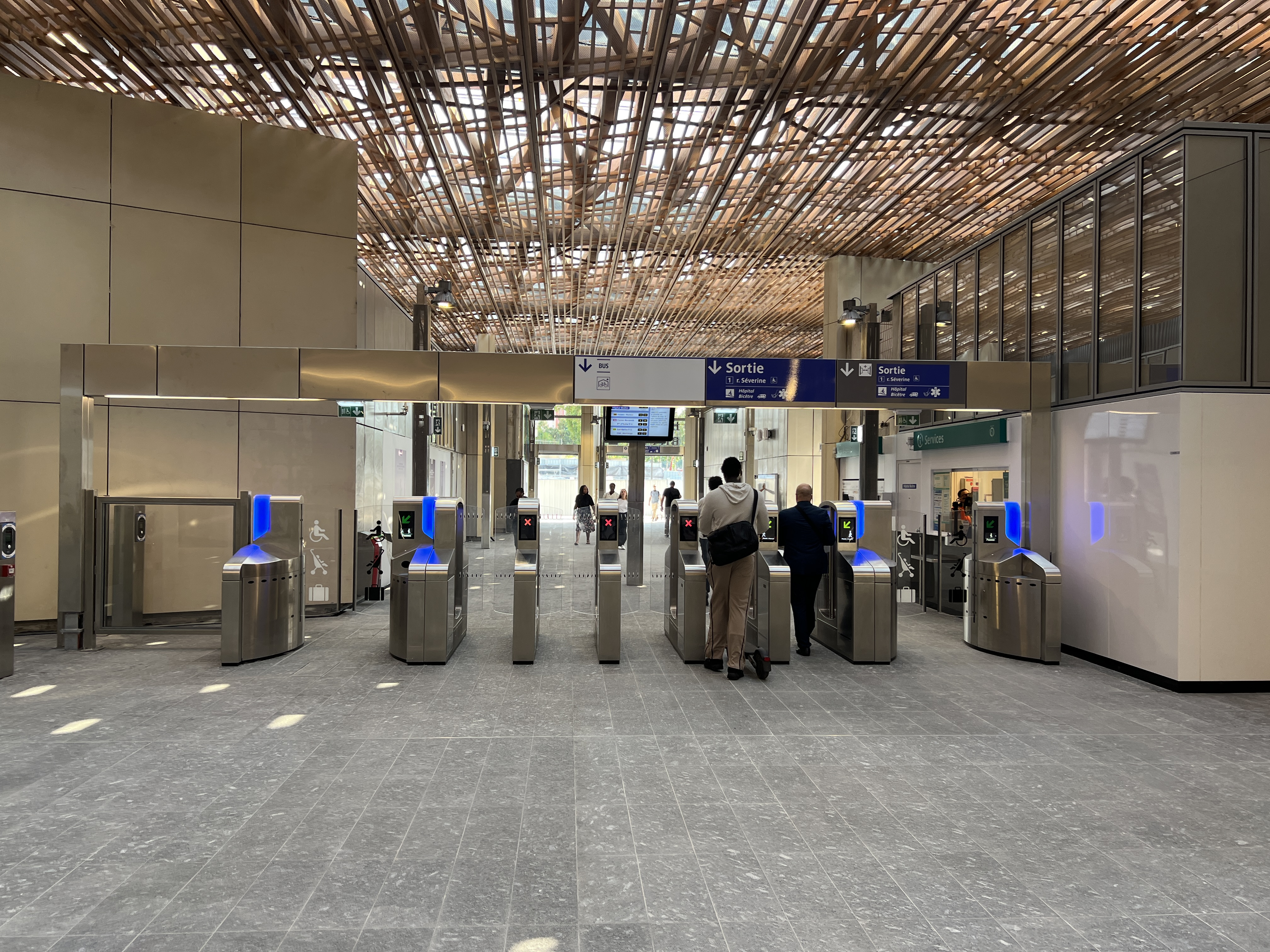
- Exit 1 and ticket gates

General information
- Location: Rue Gabriel Péri, Rue Séverine; Le Kremlin-Bicêtre; France
- Coordinates: 48°48′35″N 2°20′59″E
- Owner: RATP
- Line: Paris Metro Paris Metro Line 14
- Platforms: 2 side platforms
- Tracks: 2

Construction
- Structure type: Underground
- Depth: 22 m (72 ft)
- Accessible: Yes
- Architect: Jean-Paul Viguier Architecture and Associates

Other information
- Station code: GA42 / 42KBH

History
- Opened: 24 June 2024

Services
Preceding station	Paris Metro	Following station
Maison Blanche towards Saint-Denis–Pleyel	Line 14	Villejuif–Gustave Roussy towards Aéroport d'Orly
Location
- Location within Paris

Hôpital Bicêtre (French pronunciation: [opital bisɛtʁ]; lit. 'Bicêtre Hospital') is a station on Line 14 of the Paris Metro. It is located in the commune of Le Kremlin-Bicêtre in the department of Val-de-Marne, near the commune of Gentilly. It is 800 metres away from Bicêtre Hospital. It opened on 24 June 2024 as part of the southern extension of Line 14 from Olympiades to Aéroport d'Orly.

== History ==
The station was initially referred to by its provisional name Kremlin-Bicêtre Hôpital. In a public consultation exercise conducted between 20 June to 4 July 2022, voters were given two names to choose from: Kremlin-Bicêtre Hôpital or Hôpital Bicêtre. On 27 July 2022, it was announced that the name Hôpital Bicêtre was chosen.

A bas-relief artwork created by Eva Jospin in cooperation with the architect Jean-Paul Viguier, will be installed on both the interior and exterior of the station. It comprises a concrete wall made to look like strata with bronze vines hanging down from the top. The vines were ideated from cardboard models, the artist's favourite material. The artwork was inspired by the film Roma where many buried ancient artifacts were uncovered during the construction of the Rome Metro, hence, illustrating the petrification and archaeological remains during the construction of the Grand Paris Express in her artwork.

Preparatory work for the extension of line 14 to Aéroport d'Orly which commenced in May 2016 was completed in April 2018. It involved a test pit being dug at rue du professor Bergonié and the diversion of underground utilities (electricity, telephone, internet, etc.) to free up space for the construction of the station. Construction of the station and its two ventilation structures began on 23 April 2018 by the Dodin Campenon Bernard / VINCI consortium.

On 24 September 2020, Allison, a tunnel boring machine, arrived at the southern end of the station box, 15 months after it was launched at L'Haÿ-les-Roses, 3200 m away. It was responsible for digging the northern third of the tunnels of the extension of line 14. It was then shifted to the northern end of the station box, in a process taking approximately three weeks, then continued on digging the remaining 1300 m to Maison-Blanche.

On 15 December 2022, the roof of the station was completed, including its wooden frame and glazing, with work having started on it since April 2022. Work on the station's walls as well as the installation of the platform facades were completed by the beginning of 2023.

== Passenger services ==
=== Access ===
The station has two accesses:

- Access 1: rue Séverine
- Access 2: rue Gabriel Péri Hôpital Bicêtre

=== Station layout ===
Street Level
B1	Mezzanine
Platform level	Side platform with PSDs, doors will open on the right
Platform level	Northbound	← toward Saint-Denis–Pleyel (Maison Blanche)
Platform level	Southbound	toward Aéroport d'Orly (Villejuif–Gustave Roussy) →
Platform level	Side platform with PSDs, doors will open on the right

=== Platforms ===
The station has a standard configuration with 2 tracks surrounded by 2 side platforms.

=== Other connections ===
The station is also served by lines 125, 186, and 323 of the RATP bus network, as well as line v6 of the Valouette bus network.

== Nearby ==
- Bicêtre Hospital
- Paris-Saclay Medical School

== Gallery ==
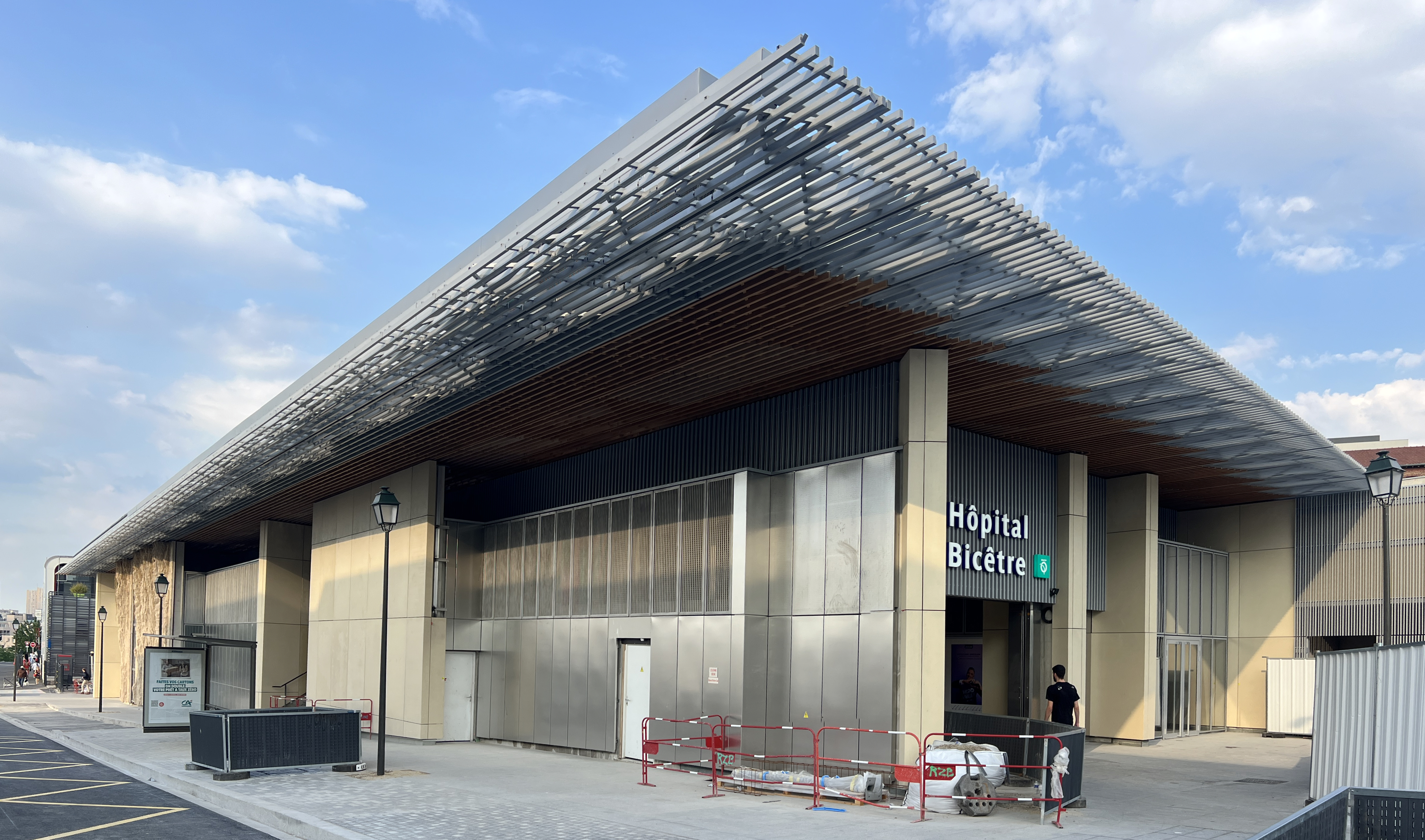
Exterior

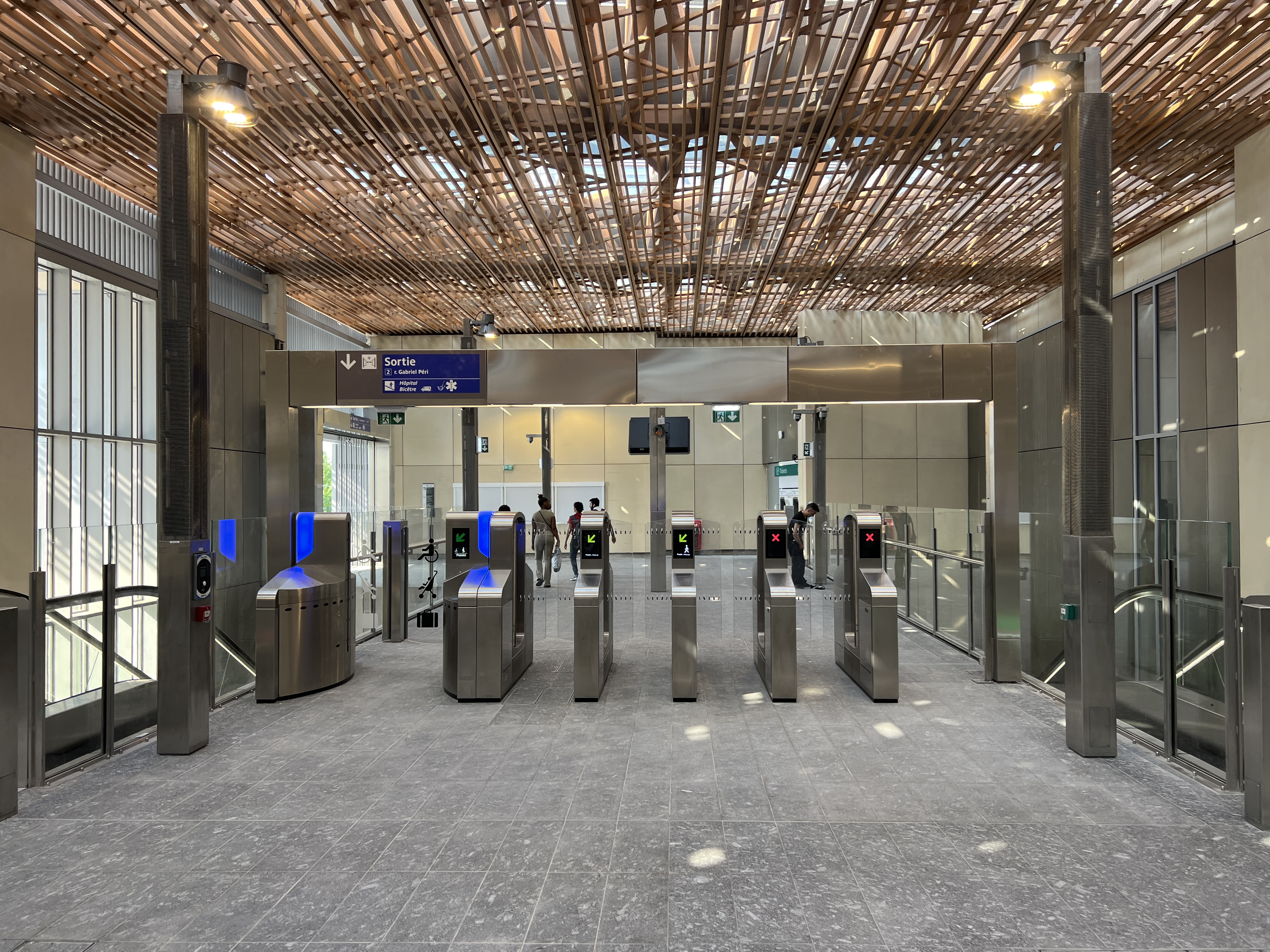
Access 2

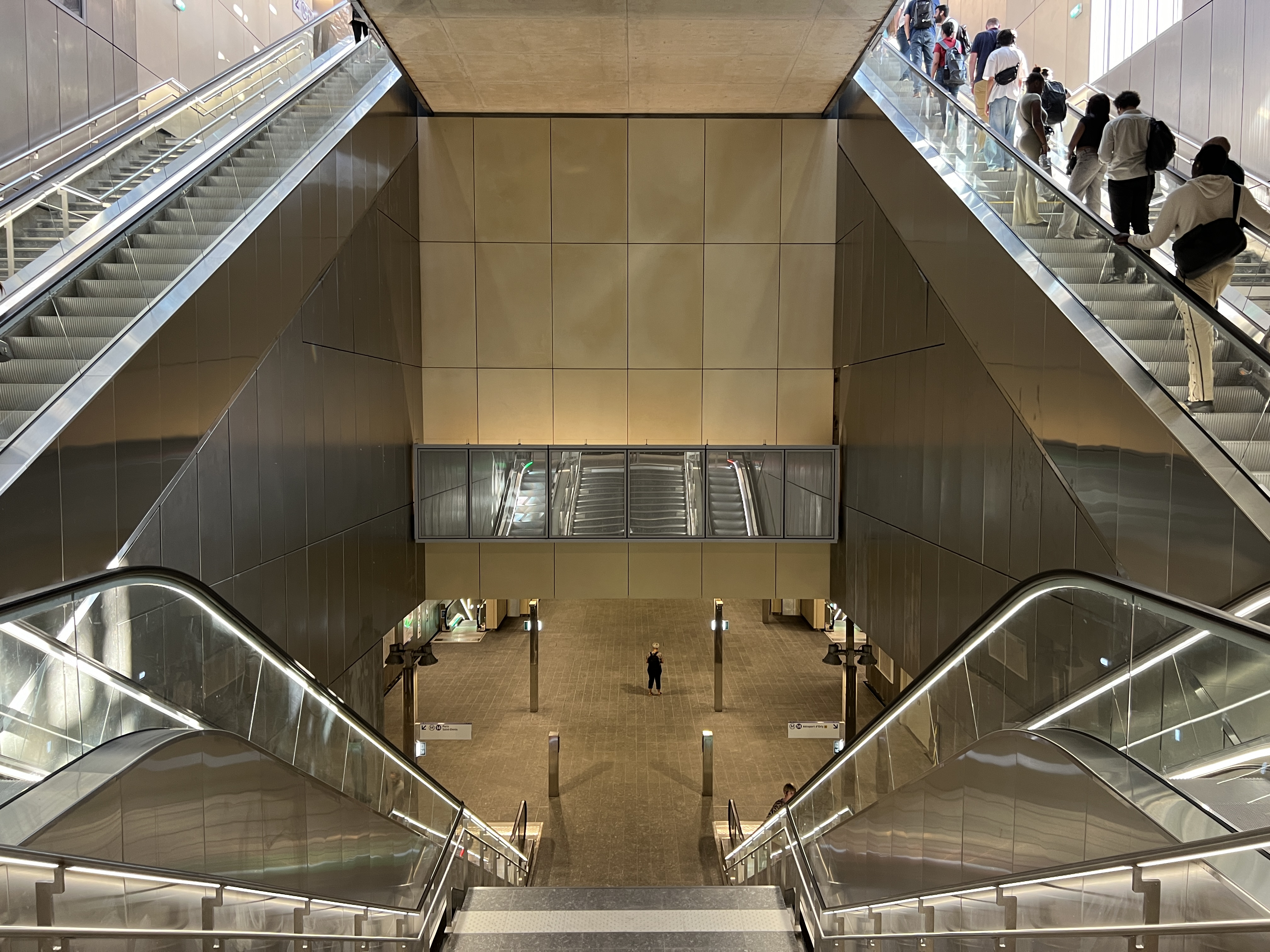
View of the mezzanine level

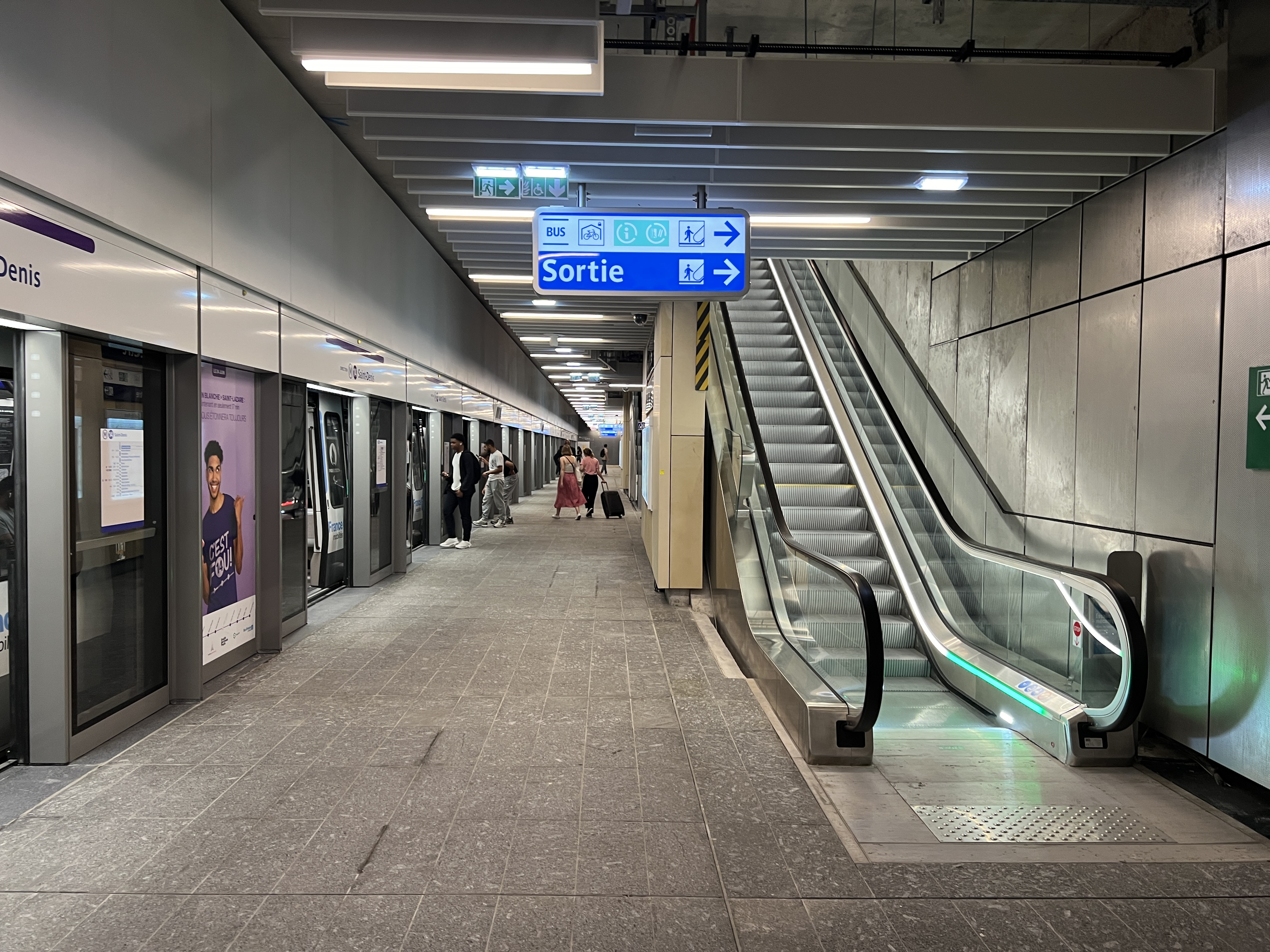
Northbound platform

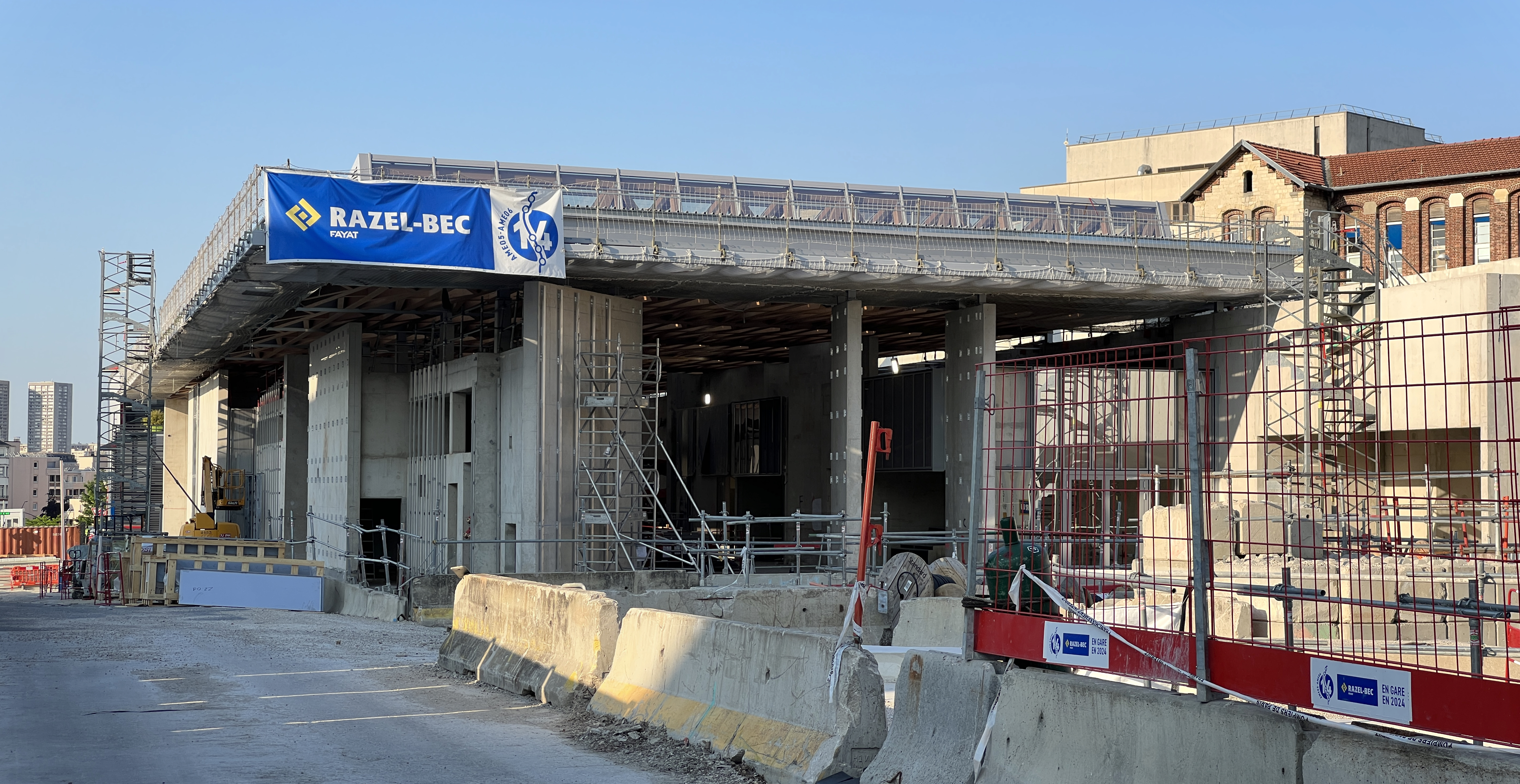
Construction works in 2023
