= Casabianca =

Casabianca may refer to:

== People ==
- Camille de Casabianca (born 1960), French filmmaker and writer
- Luc-Julien-Joseph Casabianca (1762–1798), French Navy officer
- Paul de Casabianca (1839–1916), French lawyer, Senator of Corsica from 1885 to 1903
- Raphaël, Comte de Casabianca (1738–1825), French general

== Ships ==
A number of vessels of the French Navy are named after Luc Casabianca:

- French submarine Casabianca (1935)
- Casabianca, a T 47-class destroyer
- French submarine Casabianca (S603)

== Geography ==
- Casabianca, Haute-Corse, a commune in the Haute-Corse department, Corsica, France
- Casabianca, Tolima, a municipality in the Tolima Department, Colombia

== Other ==
- "Casabianca" (poem), a poem by Felicia Dorothea Hemans
- Casabianca (film), a 1951 French film directed by Georges Péclet

== See also ==
- Casablanca (disambiguation)
