= White Houses =

White Houses may refer to:

- White Houses, Nottinghamshire, England
- "White Houses" (Eric Burdon and The Animals song), recorded by Eric Burdon and the Animals
- "White Houses" (Vanessa Carlton song), by Vanessa Carlton

== See also ==
- White House (disambiguation)
- Whitehouse (disambiguation)
