= Maison Blanche station =

Metro station in Paris, France

Maison Blanche
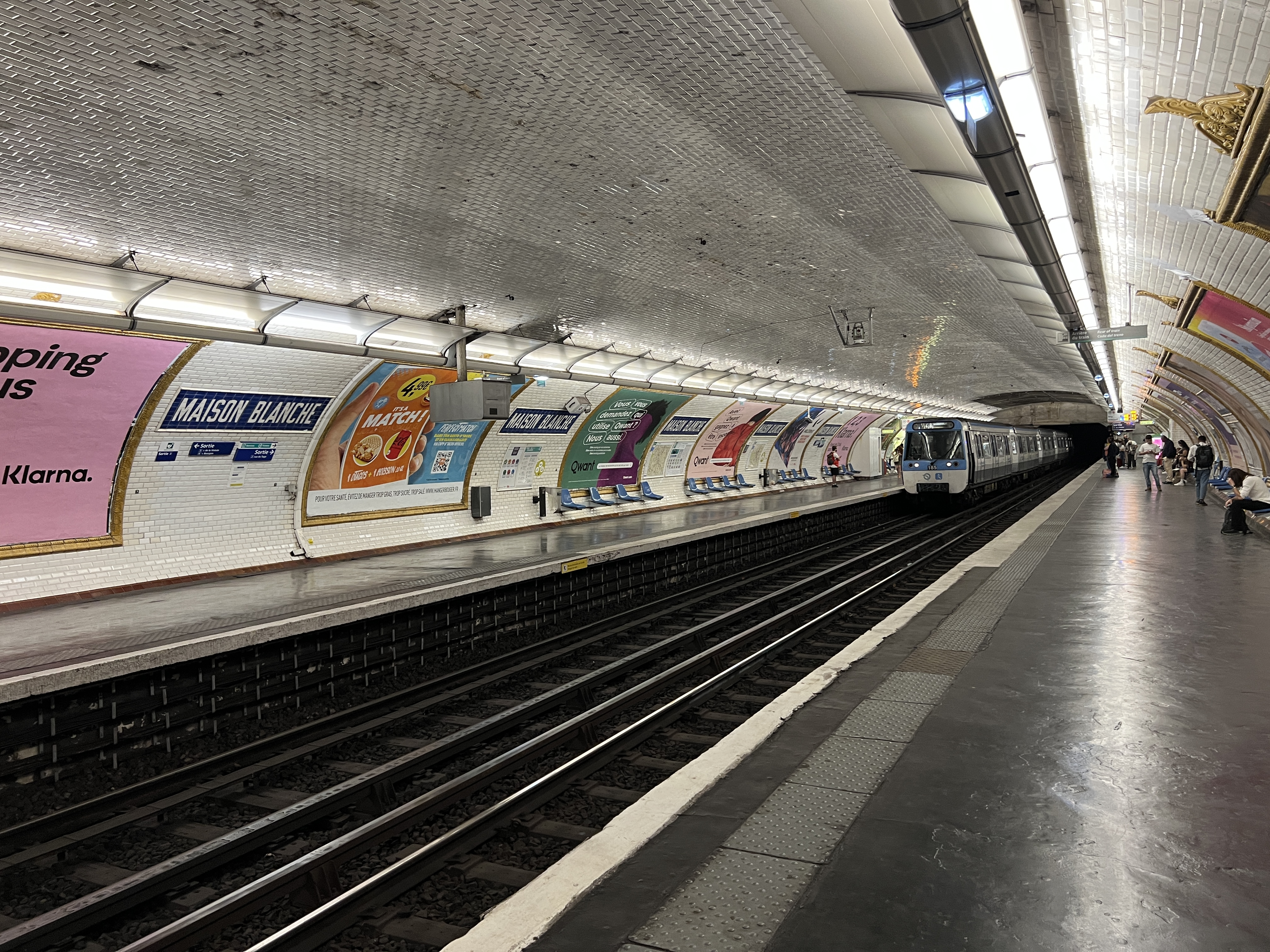
- Line 7 platforms looking south

General information
- Location: 13th arrondissement of Paris; Île-de-France; France
- Coordinates: 48°49′20″N 2°21′31″E
- Owner: RATP
- Operator: RATP

Construction
- Accessible: At least one escalator or lift in the station between the street and the platform
- Architect: Groupe-6 (Line 14 station)

Other information
- Fare zone: 1

History
- Opened: 7 March 1930; 96 years ago

Services
Preceding station	Paris Metro	Following station
Le Kremlin–Bicêtre towards Villejuif–Louis Aragon	Line 7 Villejuif branch	Tolbiac towards La Courneuve–8 mai 1945
Porte d'Italie towards Mairie d'Ivry	Line 7 Ivry branch	Tolbiac towards La Courneuve–8 mai 1945
Olympiades towards Saint-Denis–Pleyel	Line 14	Hôpital Bicêtre towards Aéroport d'Orly
Location
- Location within Paris

Maison Blanche station (French pronunciation: [mɛzɔ̃ blɑ̃ʃ]) is a station of the Paris Métro, serving lines 7 and 14. South of this station, Line 7 forks into two branches, one leading to Villejuif–Louis Aragon and the other to Mairie d'Ivry. Since June 2024, it is an interchange with Line 14 running southwards to Aéroport d'Orly.

== Location ==
The Line 7 platforms are located under Avenue d'Italie between Rue Caillaux and Rue Bourgon, near Porte d'Italie, a gate in the former Thiers Wall. Running southbound, this is the last station on the common trunk of line 7 before the branches separate at an underground grade-separated junction, one towards Mairie d'Ivry and the other towards Villejuif-Louis Aragon. Oriented approximately along a north-south axis, it is positioned on Line 17 between Tolbiac to the north and Porte d'Italie (towards Ivry) or Le Kremlin-Bicêtre (towards Villejuif) to the south. On line 14, the station is between Olympiades and Hôpital Bicêtre.

The Line 14 platforms are located under Avenue d'Italie between Rue Caillaux and Rue Tagore, east of the Line 7 platforms, at a depth of 21 metres (69 ft).

Access to the Line 14 and Line 7 platforms is from the centre of a large forecourt where the entrance to the metro is located. Travelers can use escalators or elevators to access the platforms. From the platforms, the connections are via the mezzanine.

The surface forecourt provides access to the T3a tram line or the Porte d'Italie bus hub. It also hosts a Véligo station.

== History ==
=== Original station ===
Maison Blanche originally opened as part of a planned section of Line 7 which was temporarily being operated as part of Line 10 until the completion of the under-Seine crossing of Line 7 from Pont de Sully to Place Monge. On 7 March 1930, the line was extended from Place d'Italie to Porte de Choisy, including Maison Blanche. The station was integrated into line 7 on 26 April 1931. The station is named after the district, which is named after a hotel of the same name.

In 1935, along with Place des Fêtes, a prototype air raid shelter was added to the station, fitted with airtight doors to allow civilians to take refuge inside in the event of a chemical attack. The two stations were chosen because of their proximity to heavily populated working-class districts.

On 6 October 1995, the station was the site of a terror attack by the Armed Islamic Group of Algeria. A gas cylinder placed in a trash can was discovered by a postal worker, but in exploded while the police were in the process of estbliashing a security perimeter; 18 were injured. The site was chosen in reference to the circumstances of the arrest of Khaled Kelkal, one of the main instigators of the RER B attack in Saint-Michel. A few days earlier, on 29 September 1995, police had shot Kelkal during his arrest at another place called Maison Blanche near Vaugneray, Rhône department.

On 4 October 2006, the station corridors and platform lighting were renovated as part of RATP's Renouveau du métro renewal program.

In 2019, 1,803,381 travellers entered this station, which placed it at the 259th position of 302 among the metro stations for its number of visitors.

=== Extension of line 14 ===
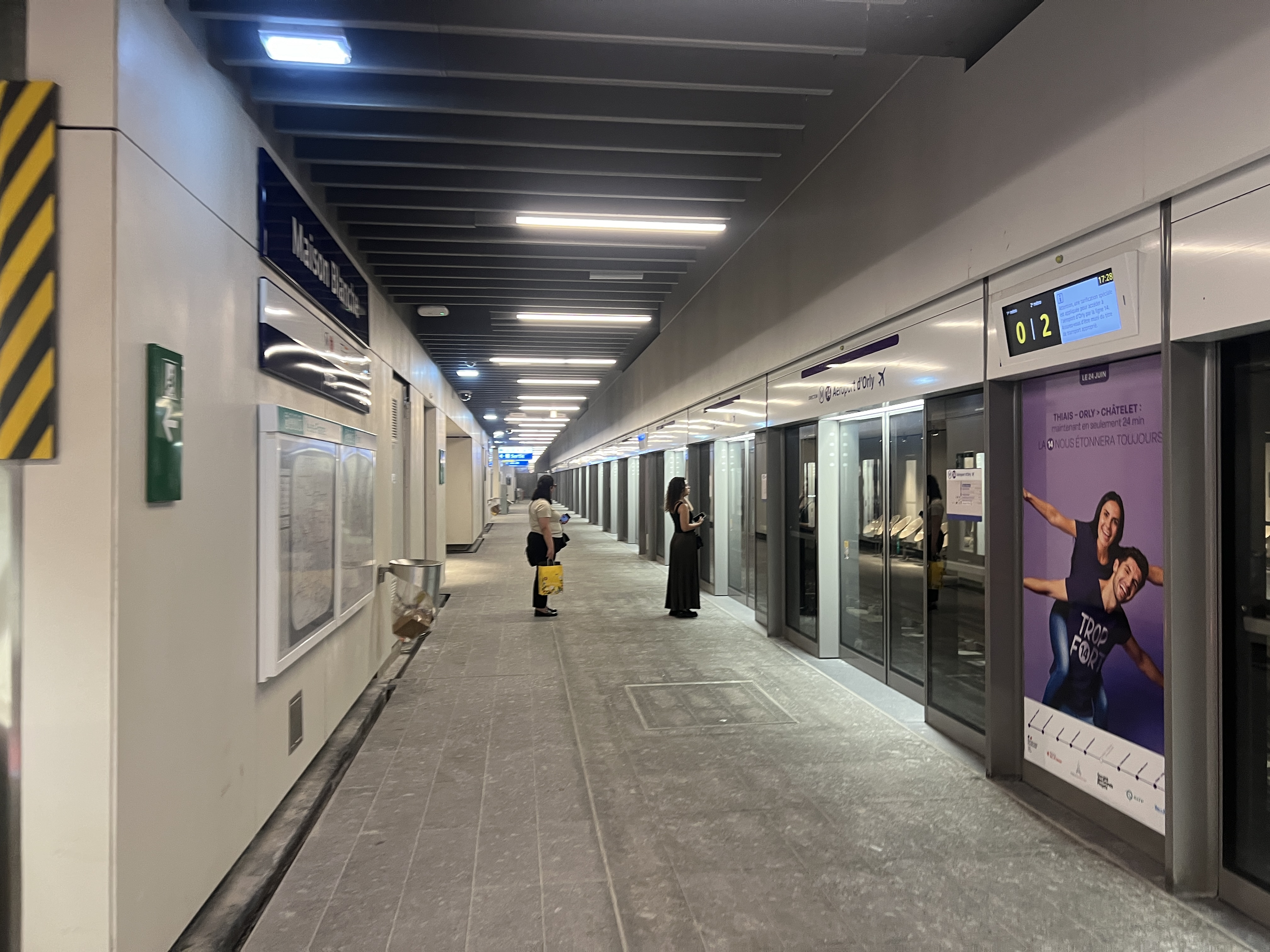
Line 14 station platform on opening day

Early plans to extend Line 14 south from Paris included the possibility of taking over the existing Line 7 branch from the station to Villejuif – Louis Aragon, which opened in the early 1980s.

In the 2010s, discussions took place regarding whether to extend Line 14 further south to Orly Airport. The declaration of public utility was issued in 2016, allowing construction on the extension to begin. The design of the station was entrusted to the consortium led by the engineering firms SETEC TPI and SYSTRA, as well as to Mark Wilson of the Groupe-6 architecture firm. The extension was originally planned to be completed in 2027; however, delivery was accelerated to 2024 following the awarding of the Paris 2024 Olympic and Paralympic Games.

Preparatory work at Maison Blanche took place from November 2016 until the end of 2017. The construction of the station began in 2018 for commissioning in 2024. In March 2018, the construction contract was awarded to Léon Grosse in consortium with Soletanche Bachy France. Tunnelling work was completed in March 2021, with the breakthrough of the tunnel boring machine at Maison Blanche. In April 2023, testing of trains on the Line 14 extension began, with an opening date of 24 June 2024 set.

Maison Blanche is the only station built in Paris as part of the Grand Paris Express, under the contracting authority of RATP.

==== Architecture and art ====
Californian artist and environmentalist sculptor Ned Kahn created an art installation overlooking the station in coordination with Mark Wilson. The work, entitled River of Air, is made of stainless steel and flexible sheets of ETFE (ethylene tetrafluoroethylene) which wave and reflect the sunlight above two of the station entrances. The height of the masts supporting the structure is 10–12 metres (33–39 ft) and the sail is 65 metres (213 ft) long and 11 metres (36 ft) wide.

== Passenger services ==
=== Access ===
The station has three entrances in front of numbers 103, 144 and 162 Avenue d'Italie. A fourth entrance, located at no. 119, was closed in November 2019 to facilitate the construction of the line 14 station. In return, the entrance located at no. 162 was rebuilt from 2016 to 2019 and provided with an escalator to exit the station.

=== Station layout ===
Street Level

B1	Connecting level

Line 7 platforms	Side platform, doors will open on the right
Line 7 platforms	Southbound	← toward Villejuif–Louis Aragon (Le Kremlin-Bicêtre) ← toward Mairie d'Ivry (Porte d'Italie)
Line 7 platforms	Northbound	toward La Courneuve–8 mai 1945 (Tolbiac) →
Line 7 platforms	Side platform, doors will open on the right

=== Platforms ===
Maison Blanche is a standard configuration station. It has two platforms separated by the metro tracks and the vault is elliptical. The decoration is of the style used for the majority of metro stations. The lighting canopies are white and rounded in the Gaudin style of the renouveau du métro des années 2000 renewal, and bevelled white ceramic tiles cover the upright wall, the vault and the tunnel exits. The advertising frames are in honey-coloured faience and the name of the station is also in earthenware. The seats are Motte style in a blue colour.

=== Bus connections ===
The station is served by line 47 and by the urban service La Traverse Bièvre Montsouris of the RATP Bus Network.

== Culture ==
The station serves as the backdrop for an important scene from Günter Grass's novel The Tin Drum (1960), in which the hero, Oscar Matzerath, sees the inspectors coming to arrest him while on the escalator to exit the station.

== Nearby ==
- Quartier asiatique
- Quartier de la Maison-Blanche
