= Maison Blanche (disambiguation) =

Maison Blanche (French: White House) was a department store in New Orleans, Louisiana.

Maison Blanche may also refer to:

- Maison Blanche Airport, a former name of Houari Boumediene Airport in Algiers
- Maison Blanche station, a Paris Metro station
- Maison blanche (villa), a house designed by Le Corbusier in La Chaux-de-Fonds, Switzerland
- Maison blanche, les Saintes, a quartier of Terre-de-Haut Island
- Dar El Beïda, Algeria, formerly called Maison Blanche
- Neuville-St Vaast German war cemetery, near Arras, Pas-de-Calais, France

== See also ==
- Reims-Maison-Blanche station
- White House (disambiguation)
