= Villejuif–Gustave Roussy station =

Paris Metro station in Villejuif

Villejuif–Gustave Roussy
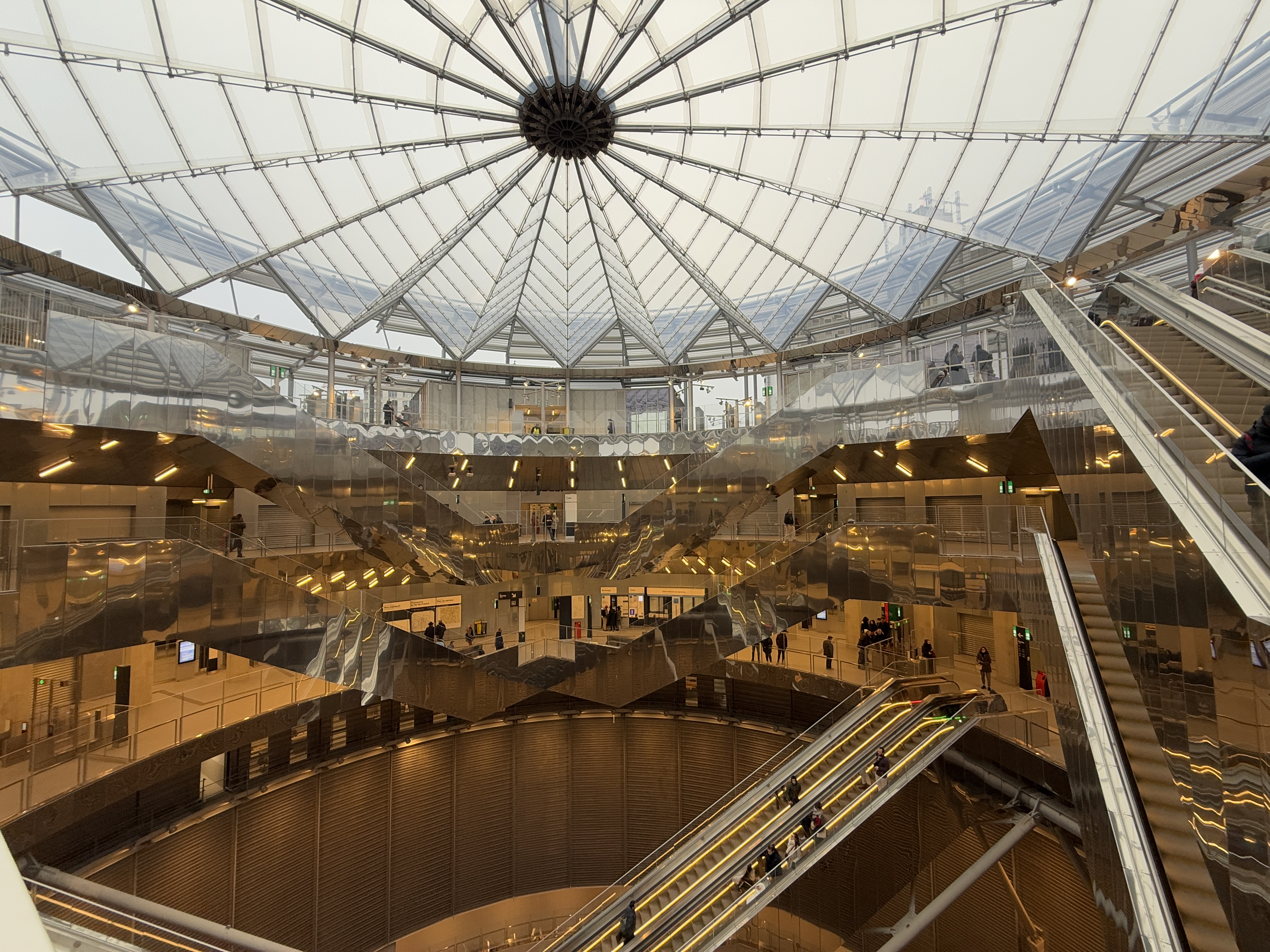
- Villejuif–Gustave Roussy station atrium

General information
- Location: Villejuif; France
- Coordinates: 48°47′36″N 2°20′57″E
- Owner: Société du Grand Paris
- Operator: RATP Group and ORA (RATP Dev, Alstom & ComfortDelGro)
- Platforms: 2 side platforms
- Tracks: 4

Construction
- Structure type: Underground
- Depth: Line 14: 36.7 m (120 ft); Line 15: 48.8 m (160 ft)
- Accessible: Yes
- Architect: Dominique Perrault

Other information
- Station code: GA17 / 17IGR
- Fare zone: 3

History
- Opened: 18 January 2025

Services
Preceding station	Paris Metro	Following station
Hôpital Bicêtre towards Saint-Denis–Pleyel	Line 14	L'Haÿ-les-Roses towards Aéroport d'Orly
Arcueil–Cachan towards Pont de Sèvres	Line 15 (autumn 2027)	Villejuif–Louis Aragon towards Noisy–Champs
Location

Villejuif–Gustave Roussy (French pronunciation: [vilʒɥif ɡystav ʁusi]) is an underground station on Line 14 and Line 15 (the latter currently under construction) of the Paris Metro. It is part of the Grand Paris Express project. The station is located in the town of Villejuif near the Institut Gustave Roussy, hence its name.

== History ==
Villejuif–Gustave Roussy station was designed by Dominique Perrault. The extension of metro Line 14 opened on 24 June 2024. For the first few months of operation, Villejuif–Gustave Roussy served only as an emergency exit, where trains passed through without serving this station. On 18 January 2025, Line 14's platforms opened for service; Line 15's platforms are expected to be put into service at this station, along with the rest of the line's southern section, in autumn 2027.

In November 2025, two French stations, Villejuif–Gustave Roussy and Saint-Denis–Pleyel, were included on the "World's Most Beautiful Stations List 2025" as part of the global design and architecture competition Prix Versailles. Seven stations in total, located in Australia, Belgium, China, France and Saudi Arabia, were nominated for their "remarkable architectural ambition" and announced at UNESCO Headquarters. In December 2025, the Villejuif–Gustave Roussy station won the Prix Versailles, with Emma Watson serving on the jury for that edition.

== Passenger service ==
=== Access ===
The station has three entrances, all of which allow access to the building:

- access 1 Institut Gustave Roussy, providing direct access to the Institute via a future covered passageway;
- access 2 Chemin de la Redoute;
- access 3 Parc des Hautes-Bruyères.

=== Platforms ===
==== Line 14 ====
The station is of standard configuration for Line 14 with two 120m long platforms and automatic platform screen doors. Along with the other new stations of the southern extension of the line, it is designed in accordance with the new architectural standards of the stations of the Société des Grands Projets.

=== Other connections ===
The station is connected to lines 131, 162, 380 of the RATP bus network.
