= White House Farm =

White House Farm may refer to:

- White House Farm (Chestertown, Maryland), listed on the National Register of Historic Places in Maryland
- White House Farm (Jefferson County, West Virginia), listed on the National Register of Historic Places in West Virginia
- White House Farm murders, Essex, England, August 1985
  - White House Farm (TV series), a 2020 British crime drama miniseries based on the murders

== See also ==
- White House (disambiguation)
- E.M. White Dairy Barn, Tempe, Arizona, listed on the NRHP in Maricopa County
- White-Plumb Farm, Greeley, Colorado, listed on the NRHP in Weld County
- T.L. White Barn, Bendena, Kansas, listed on the NRHP in Doniphan County
- McMurdie-White Farmstead, Paradise, Utah, listed on the NRHP in Cache County
