= Whitehouse station =

Whitehouse station may refer to:

- Whitehouse Station, New Jersey, a community in New Jersey, United States
- Whitehouse railway station (Northern Ireland), a former station in Newton Abbey, Antrim, Northern Ireland
- Whitehouse railway station (Scotland), a former station in Whitehouse, Aberdeenshire, Scotland
- White House station, in Whitehouse Station, New Jersey, United States

== See also ==
- Whitehouse (disambiguation)
