= Casablancas =

Casablancas is a Spanish surname. Notable people with the surname include:

- Benet Casablancas (born 1956), Spanish composer and musicologist
- John Casablancas (b.1942, d.2013), American modeling agent and scout
- Julian Casablancas (born 1978), American musician

Fictional characters:

- Cassidy and Dick Casablancas, characters in the television series Veronica Mars

== See also ==
- Casablanca (disambiguation)
