= Tolbiac station =

Railway station in France

Tolbiac
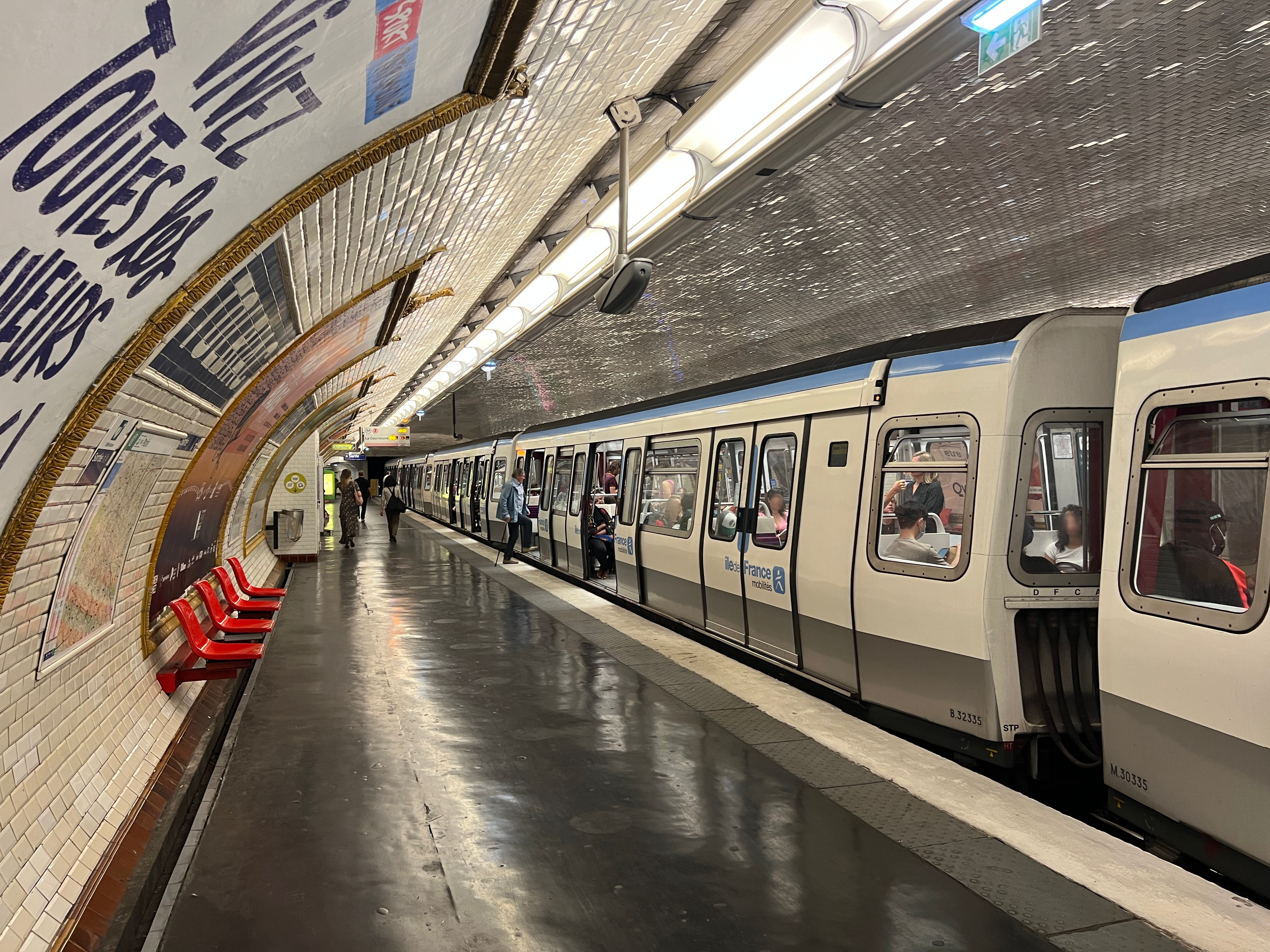

General information
- Location: 13th arrondissement of Paris; Île-de-France; France
- Coordinates: 48°49′36″N 2°21′28″E
- System: Paris Métro station
- Owner: RATP
- Operator: RATP

Other information
- Fare zone: 1

History
- Opened: 7 March 1930; 96 years ago

Services
Preceding station	Paris Metro	Following station
Maison Blanche towards Villejuif–Louis Aragon or Mairie d'Ivry	Line 7	Place d'Italie towards La Courneuve–8 mai 1945
Location
- Location within Paris

Tolbiac (French pronunciation: [tɔlbjak]) is a station of the Paris Métro. It is at the crossroads of two main roads, the Avenue d'Italie and the Rue de Tolbiac. It is near the Asian Quarter and the Parc de Choisy.

== Location ==
The station is located under Avenue d'Italie, north of the intersection with Rue de Tolbiac. Oriented approximately along a north-south axis, it is located between the Place d'Italie and Maison Blanche stations, the latter marking the end of the common line before it branches to Mairie d'Ivry and Villejuif-Louis Aragon.

== History ==
Tolbiac opened as part of a planned section of Line 7, which was temporarily operated as part of Line 10 until the completion of the under-Seine crossing of line 7 from Pont de Sully to Place Monge. On 7 March 1930 the line was extended from Place d'Italie to Porte de Choisy, including Tolbiac. The station was integrated into line 7 on 26 April 1931. It is named after the Rue de Tolbiac. Tolbiac was the site of a battle near Cologne, where the Franks under Clovis I beat the Alamanni in 496.

As part of RATP's Renouveau du métro program, the station corridors and platform lighting were renovated by 29 June 29, 2005. It saw 3,191,066 travellers enter in 2019, which places it at the 157th position of metro stations for its attendance.

== Passenger services ==
=== Access ===
The station has four entries divided into seven metro entrances, each with a Dervaux-type balustrade and leading to Avenue d'Italie:

- Entrance 1: Rue de Tolbiac, made up of two fixed staircases established back-to-back, one of which is adorned with a Dervaux candelabra, located to the right of no. 76 Rue de Tolbiac;
- Entrance 2: Avenue d'Italie, an escalator going up allowing only the exit from the platform in the direction of Mairie d'Ivry and Villejuif-Louis Aragon, located opposite no. 72 Avenue d'Italie;
- Entrance 3: Rue Toussaint-Féron, comprising two fixed back-to-back staircases, one of which has a Dervaux mast, leading to the right of numbers 55 and 57 on the avenue;
- Entrance 4: Rue de la Maison-Blanche, also made up of two fixed back-to-back staircases, one of which has a Dervaux totem, located opposite numbers 61 and 63 on the avenue.

=== Station layout ===
Street Level

B1	Connecting level

Line 7 platforms	Side platform, doors will open on the right
Line 7 platforms	Southbound	← toward Villejuif – Louis Aragon or Mairie d'Ivry (Maison Blanche)
Line 7 platforms	Northbound	toward La Courneuve–8 mai 1945 (Place d'Italie) →
Line 7 platforms	Side platform, doors will open on the right

=== Platforms ===
Tolbiac is a standard configuration station. It has two platforms separated by the metro tracks and the vault is elliptical. The decoration is of the style used for the majority of metro stations. The lighting canopies are white and rounded in the Gaudin style of the renouveau du métro des années 2000, and the bevelled white ceramic tiles cover the upright walls, the vault and the tunnel exits. The advertising frames are in honey-coloured faience and the name of the station is also in faience in the style of the original CMP. The Motte style seats are red.

=== Bus connections ===
The station is served by lines 47 and 62 and by the urban service La Traverse Bièvre Montsouris of the RATP Bus Network.

== Nearby ==
- Quartier Asiatique
- Parc de Choisy
- Lycée Claude-Monet
