= Whitehouse =

Whitehouse may refer to:

== People ==
- Charles S. Whitehouse (1921–2001), American diplomat
- Cornelius Whitehouse (1796–1883), English engineer and inventor
- E. Sheldon Whitehouse (1883–1965), American diplomat
- Elliott Whitehouse (born 1993), English footballer
- Eula Whitehouse (1892–1974), American botanist
- Frederick William Whitehouse (1900–1973), Australian geologist
- Jimmy Whitehouse (footballer, born 1924) (1924–2005), English footballer
- Mary Whitehouse (1910–2001), British Christian morality campaigner
- Morris H. Whitehouse (1878–1944), American architect
- Paul Whitehouse (born 1958), Welsh comedian and actor
- Paul Whitehouse (police officer) (born 1944)
- Sheldon Whitehouse (born 1955), American politician from the state of Rhode Island
- Wildman Whitehouse (1816–1890), English surgeon and chief electrician for the transatlantic telegraph cable

== Places ==
in the United Kingdom

- Whitehouse, Aberdeenshire, location of the Whitehouse railway station on the Alford Valley Railway in Aberdeenshire, Scotland
- Whitehouse, Argyll, a hamlet on the Kintyre peninsula of Argyll and Bute, Scotland
- Whitehouse, Ipswich, a suburb of Ipswich, Suffolk, England
  - Whitehouse Ward, Ipswich
- Whitehouse, Milton Keynes, a civil parish in Milton Keynes, Buckinghamshire, England

in the United States

- Whitehouse, a neighborhood of Jacksonville, Florida
- Whitehouse, Georgia, an unincorporated community
- Whitehouse, New Jersey, a village in Readington, New Jersey
- Whitehouse, Ohio, a village in Ohio
- Whitehouse, Texas, a city in Texas

== Other ==
- B. B. Whitehouse, organ manufacturer in Brisbane, Australia
- Whitehouse (magazine), a British pornographic magazine first published in 1974
- Whitehouse (band), English power electronics band named after Mary Whitehouse
- Whitehouse Institute of Design, an Australian art and design school
- The Whitehouse (pub), a Grade II Listed public house in Liverpool
- Whitehouse station (disambiguation), stations of the name

Web sites

- WhiteHouse.gov, official White House website launched in 1994
- Whitehouse.com, former adult entertainment website
- Whitehouse.org, a parody website that Chickenhead Productions created in 2001

== See also ==
- White House, the residence of the president of the United States
- White House (disambiguation)
