= Olympiades station =

Metro station in Paris, France

Olympiades
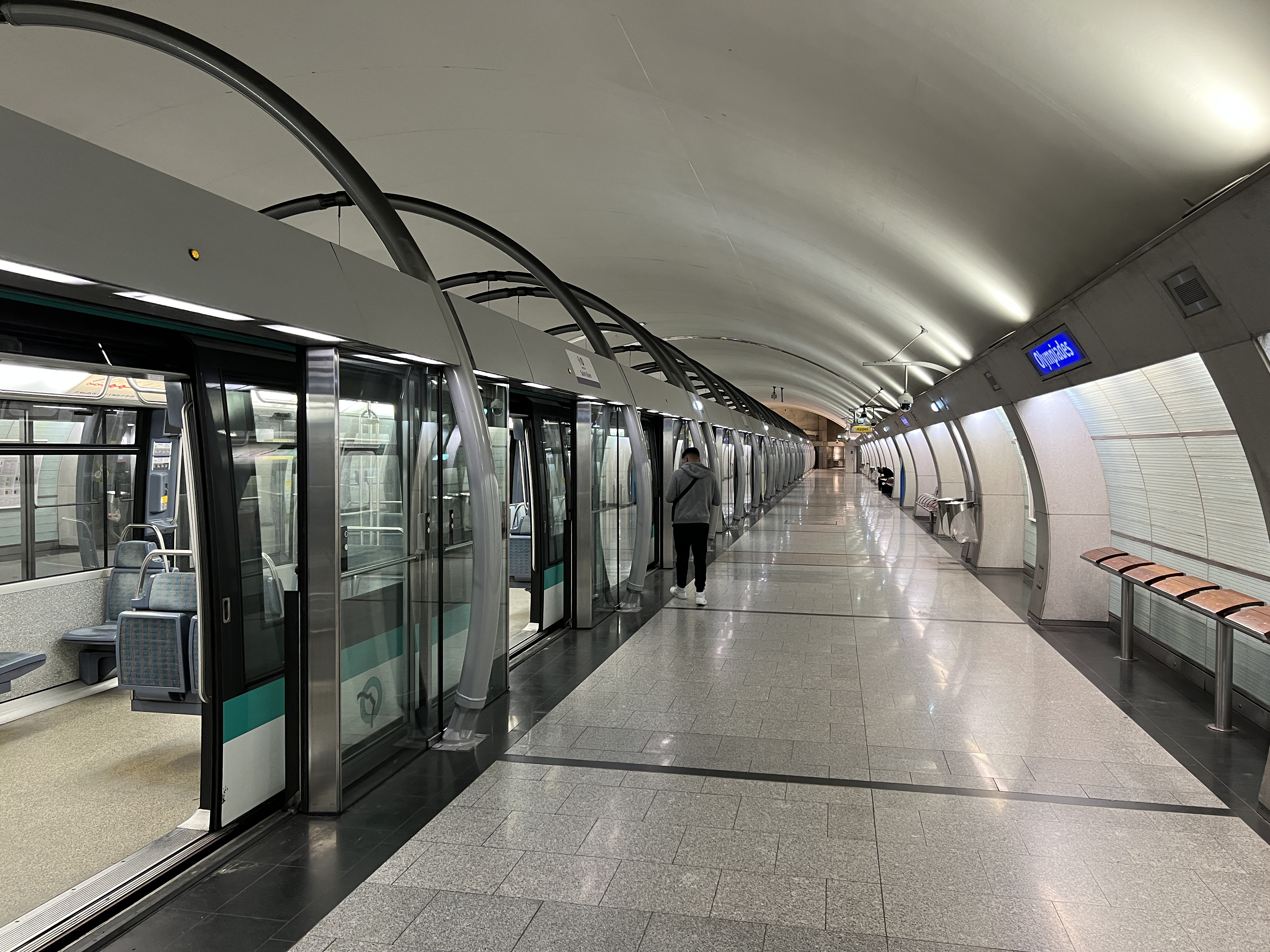
- Station view

General information
- Location: Les Olympiades; 13th arrondissement of Paris; France
- Coordinates: 48°49′38″N 2°22′06″E
- Owner: RATP
- Line: Paris Metro Paris Metro Line 14
- Platforms: 2 side platforms
- Tracks: 2

Construction
- Accessible: Yes

Other information
- Fare zone: 1

History
- Opened: 26 June 2007

Services
Preceding station	Paris Metro	Following station
Bibliothèque François Mitterrand towards Saint-Denis–Pleyel	Line 14	Maison Blanche towards Aéroport d'Orly
Location
- Location within Paris

Olympiades (French pronunciation: [ɔlɛ̃pjad]) is a station on Line 14 of the Paris Métro.

The station was formally inaugurated on 15 June 2007 in the presence of the Mayor of Paris, Bertrand Delanoë. It was opened to the general public at just before 5:30 a.m. on 26 June 2007. It takes its name from the area of high-rise residential tower blocks known as Les Olympiades in the heart of Paris's 13th arrondissement, to the east of the station Tolbiac, a quarter of Paris that was previously poorly served by the Metro. This area also contains the Tolbiac centre of the University of Paris and the largest Chinatown within Paris.

Since the opening of the station, residents of the area, as well as staff and students at the university, can now access Saint-Lazare railway station in 13 minutes and the centre of Paris in around 10 minutes. The station entrance is at the intersection of the Rue de Tolbiac and Rue Nationale. The station served as the southern terminus of Line 14 until it was extended south to Aéroport d'Orly on 24 June 2024.

== History ==
Originally called "Tolbiac-Nationale" in the initial Line 14 project, the opening of this station as part of the link between Saint Lazare and Maison Blanche station, was delayed due to a financial shortfall. The plans for Line 14 were revised and a first stage was embarked upon, in which the line ran from Madeleine to Bibliothèque François Mitterrand. This section was opened in 1998, from which the present station Olympiades was used as a temporary maintenance facility.

A new extension of the line of 676 metres was later decided upon and allocated funds; the maintenance facility was moved further down the tunnel. Like the rest of Line 14, the extension is essentially composed of a monotubular tunnel containing two tracks, one for each direction.

The extension was delayed by almost a year after its construction caused the collapse of the playground of Auguste-Perret school, located above one of the underground facilities. Further problems were encountered with the extension's automatisation.

The chosen name provoked tensions between the RATP (the Parisian transport authority), the city of Paris and the Comité National Olympique et Sportif Français (French National Olympic and Sport Committee), which owned the name. An agreement reached at the start of July 2006 found a compromise by allowing the use of this name within the restricted context of public transport.

A southern extension of Line 14 from Olympiades to Orly Airport, with 6 intermediate stations, was built for the 2024 Summer Olympics. A new maintenance facility was built in Morangis, replacing the facility in the tail tracks at Olympiades. The extension opened on 24 June 2024.

== Architecture ==
The station's architecture is in keeping with the other stations of Line 14. It is marked by concrete vaults as well as a high ceiling and platforms that are wider than average in the Paris Metro system.

== Station layout ==
G	Street Level	Exit/Entrance
B1	Mezzanine	to Exits/Entrances
B2	Side platform with PSDs, doors will open on the right
B2	Southbound	← toward Aéroport d'Orly (Maison Blanche)
B2	Northbound	toward Saint-Denis–Pleyel (Bibliothèque François Mitterrand) →
B2	Side platform with PSDs, doors will open on the right

== Gallery ==
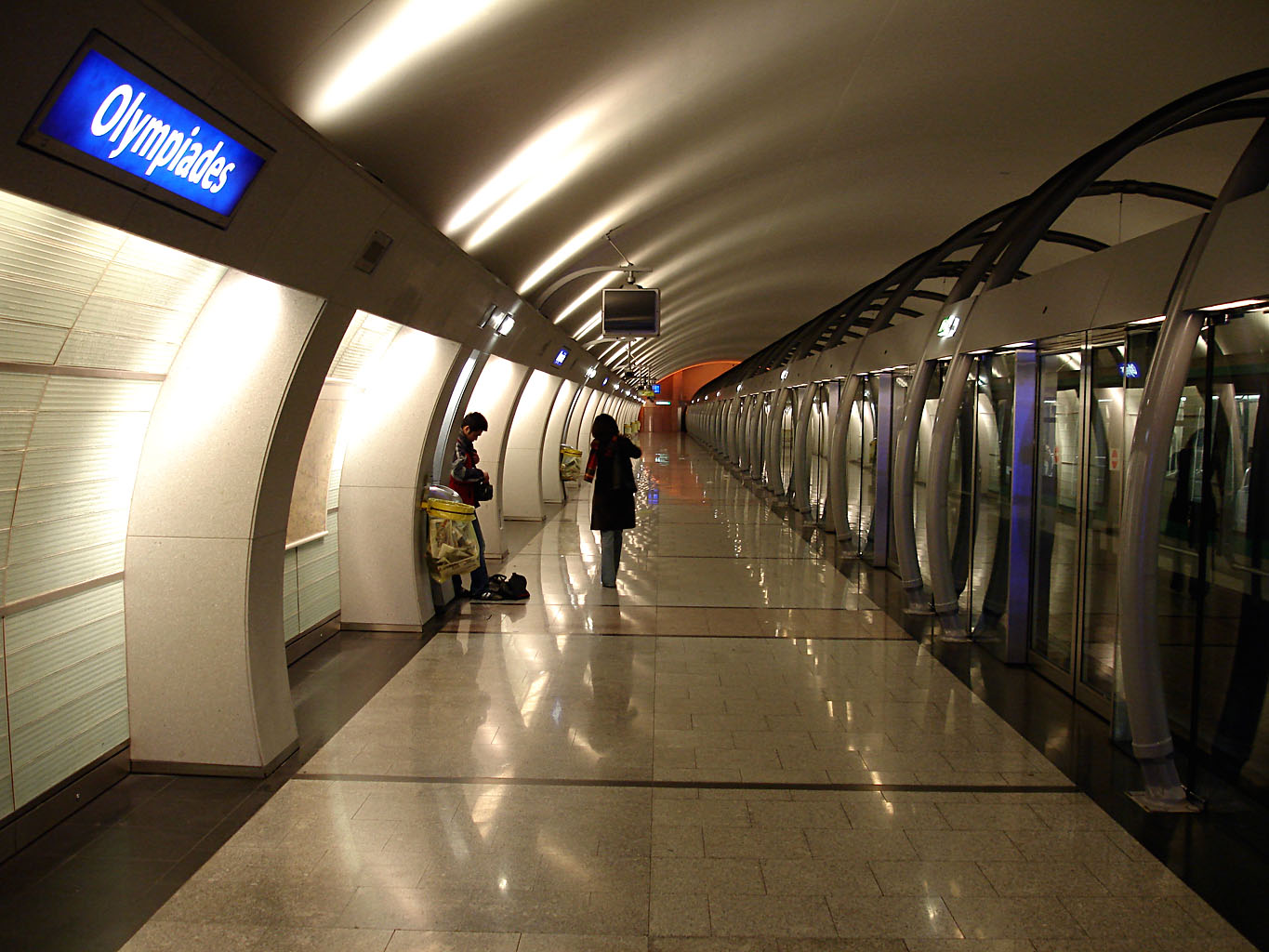
Line 14 platforms at Olympiades

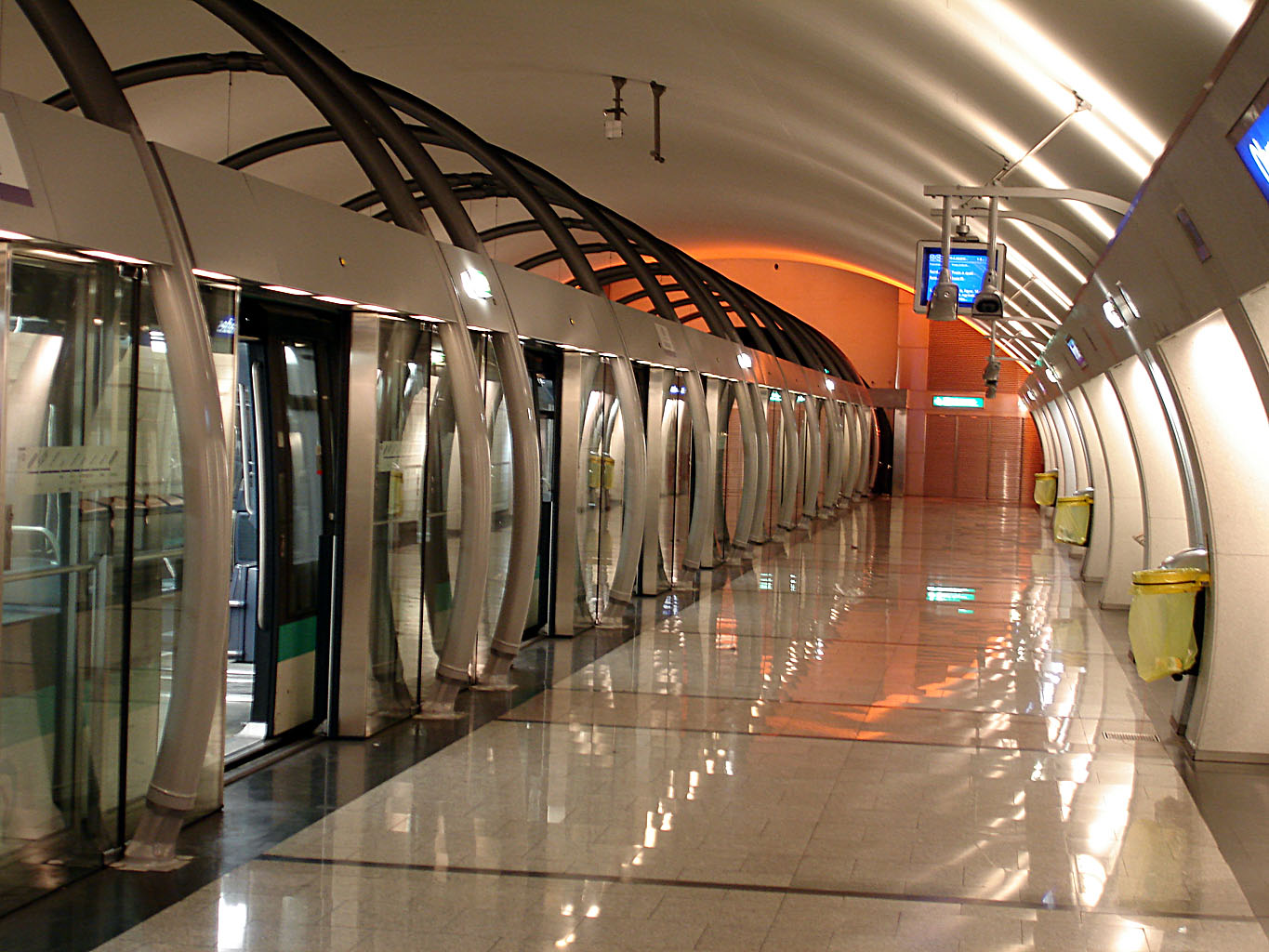
Line 14 platforms at Olympiades

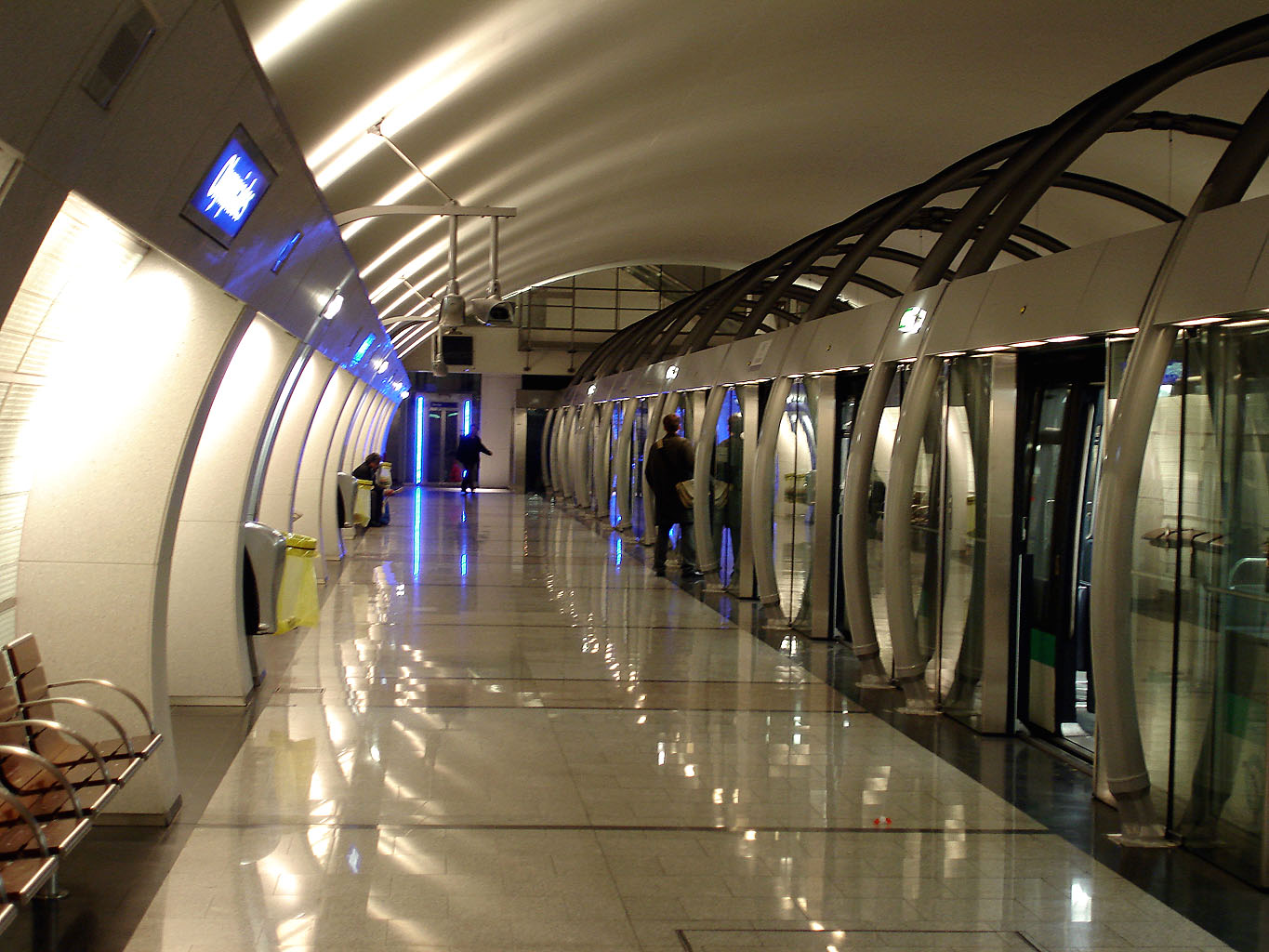
Line 14 platforms at Olympiades

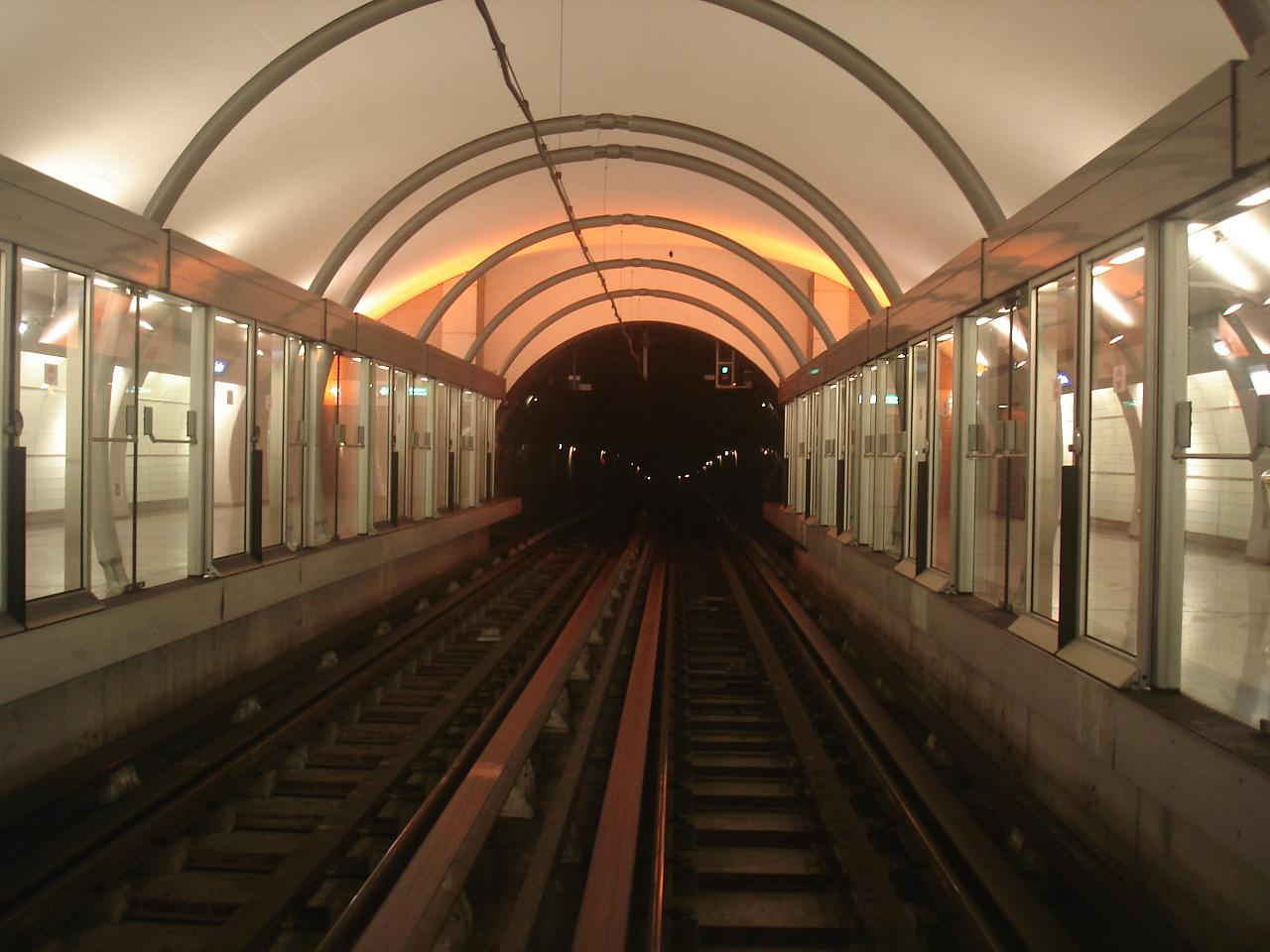
View of Olympiades from train

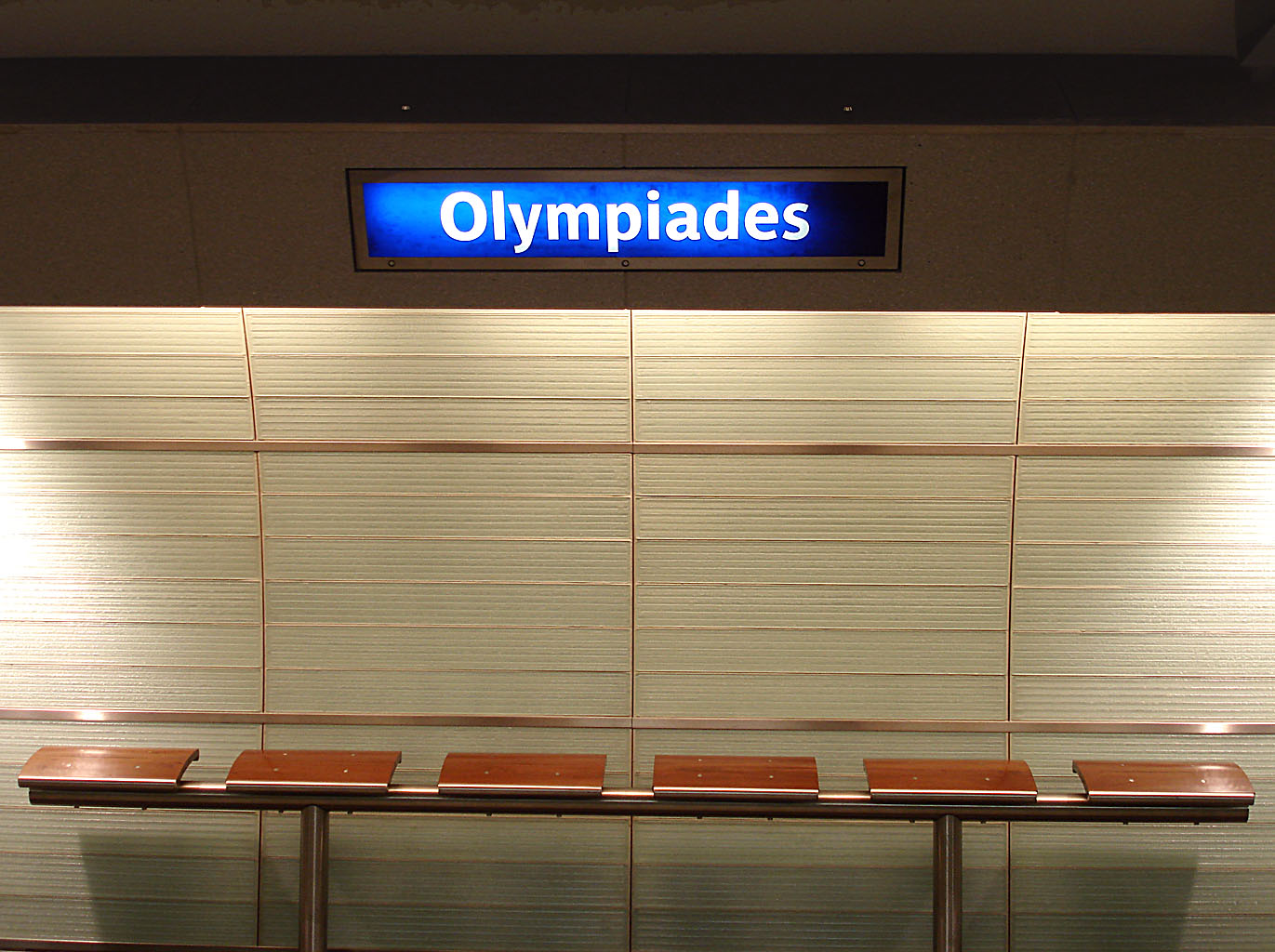
Platform signage at Olympiades

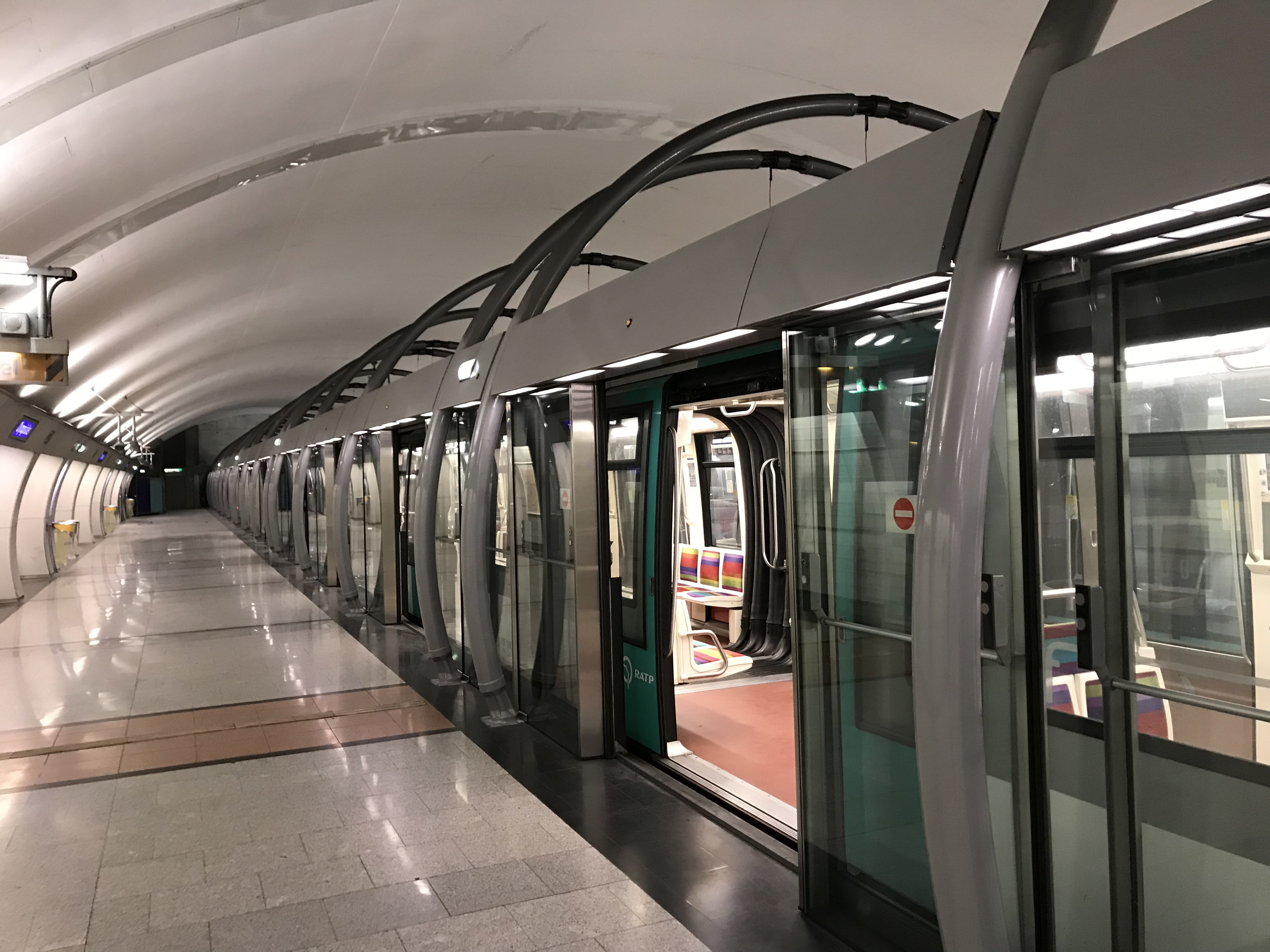
MP 05 rolling stock at Olympiades

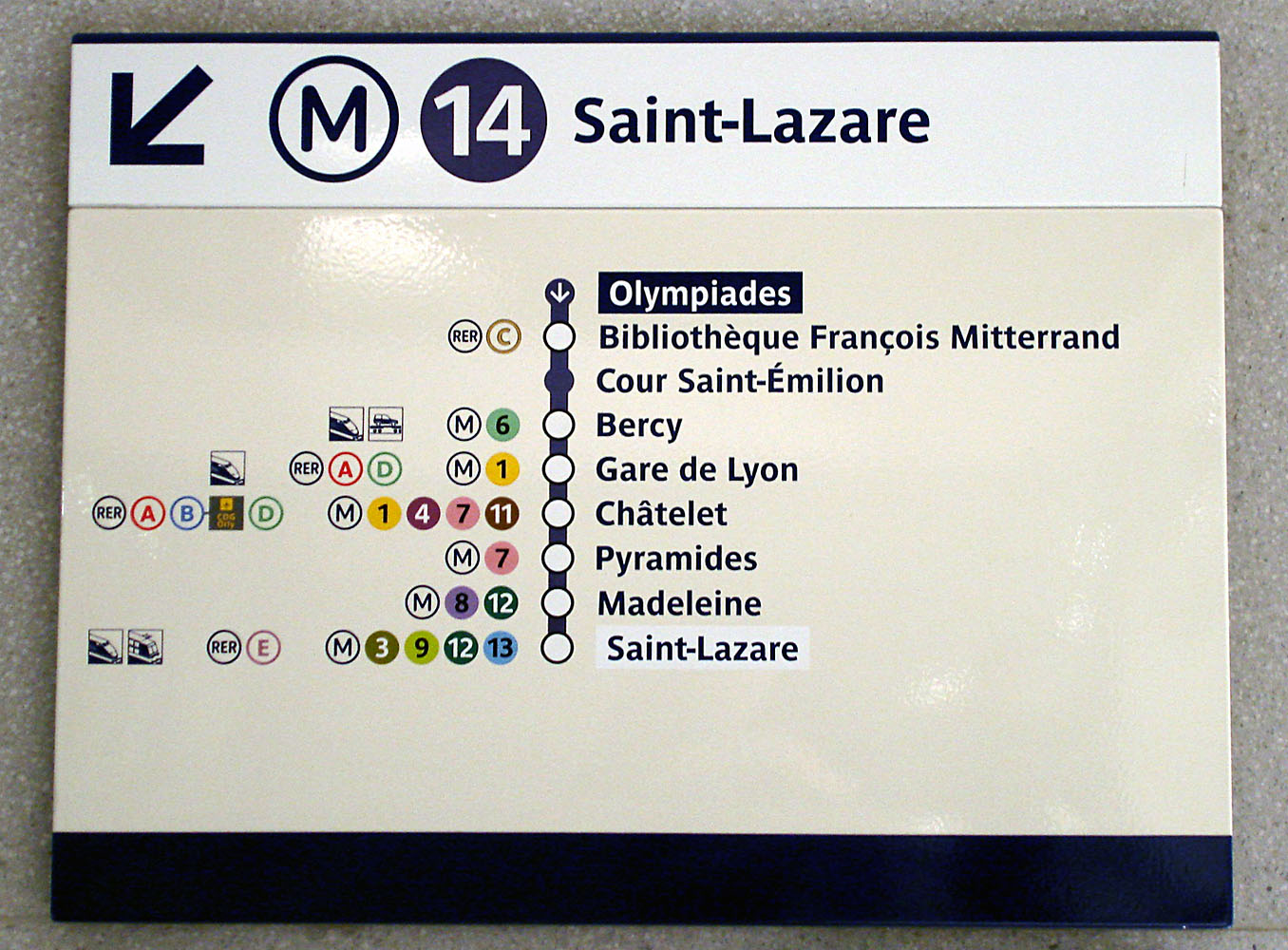
Line 14 map at Olympiades

== See also ==
- List of stations of the Paris Métro
- List of stations of the Paris RER
