= Parc de Choisy =

Urban park in Paris, France

Coordinates: 48.828°N 2.360°E

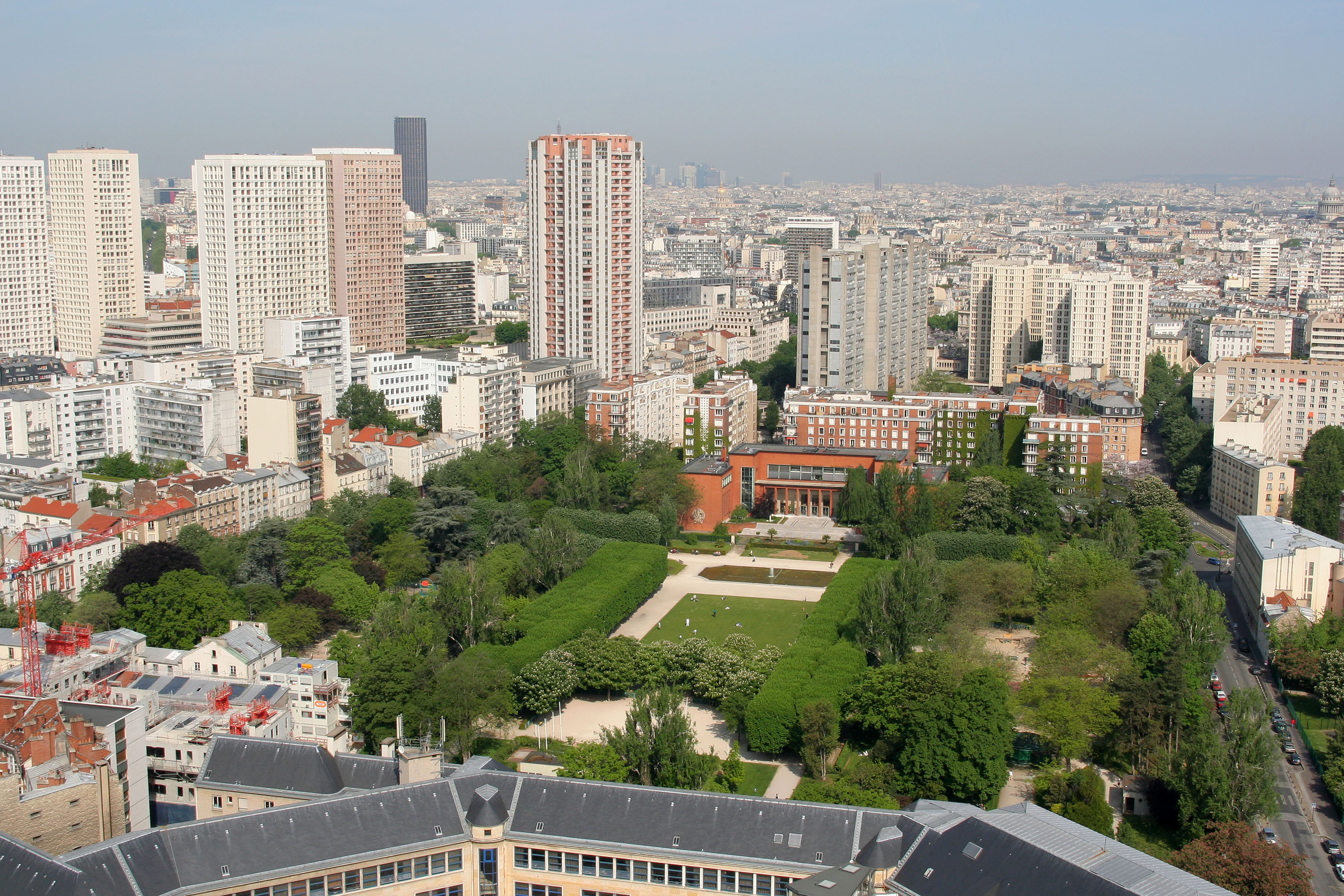
The Parc de Choisy from the Tour Athènes

The Parc de Choisy is a public park located in the 13th arrondissement of Paris, near the Quartier Asiatique between avenue de Choisy, rue George-Eastman, rue Charles-Moureu, and rue du Docteur-Magnan. It was created in 1937. The nearest metro station is Tolbiac.

== History ==
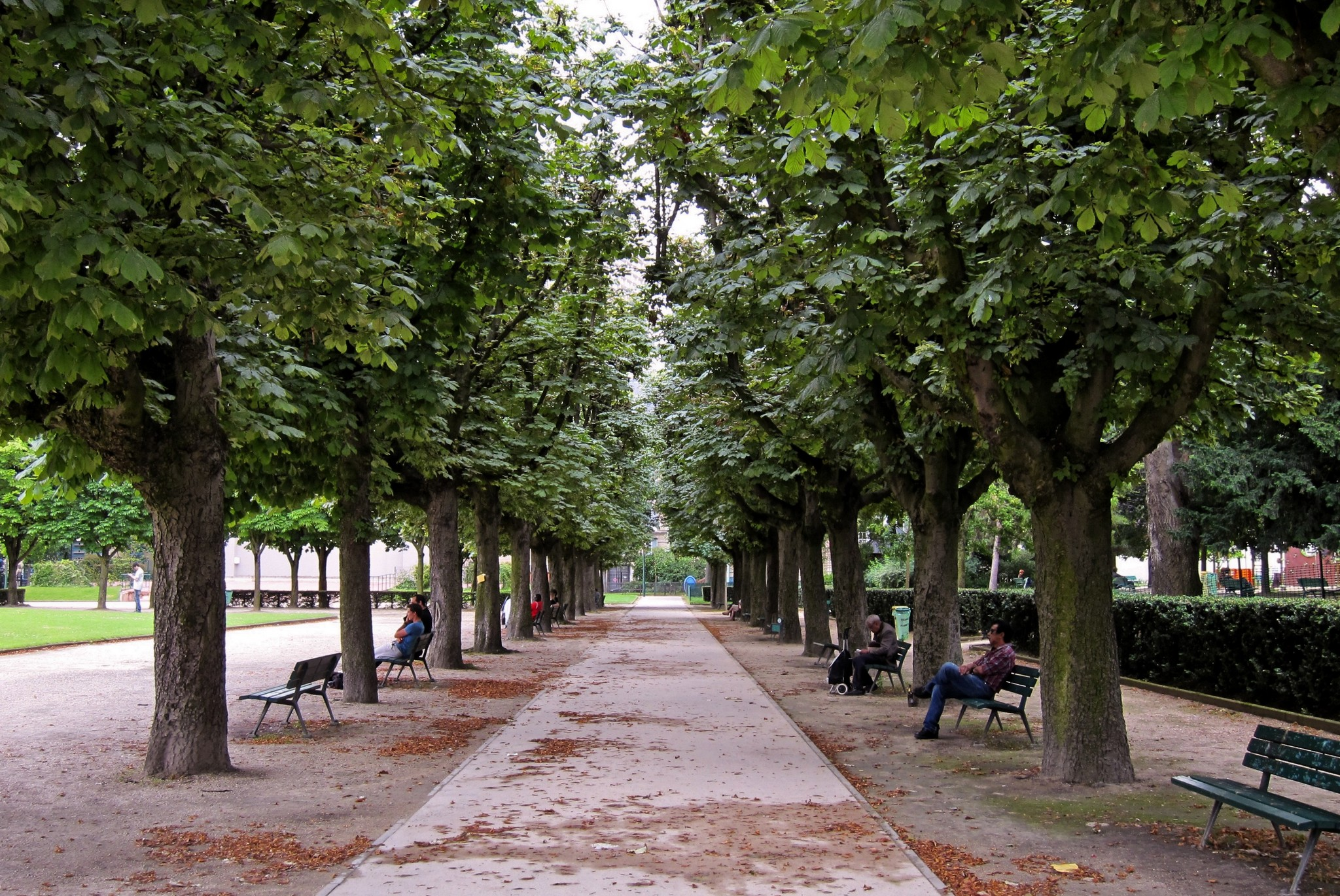
Like a formal French garden, the Parc de Choisy has long straight alleys of trees.

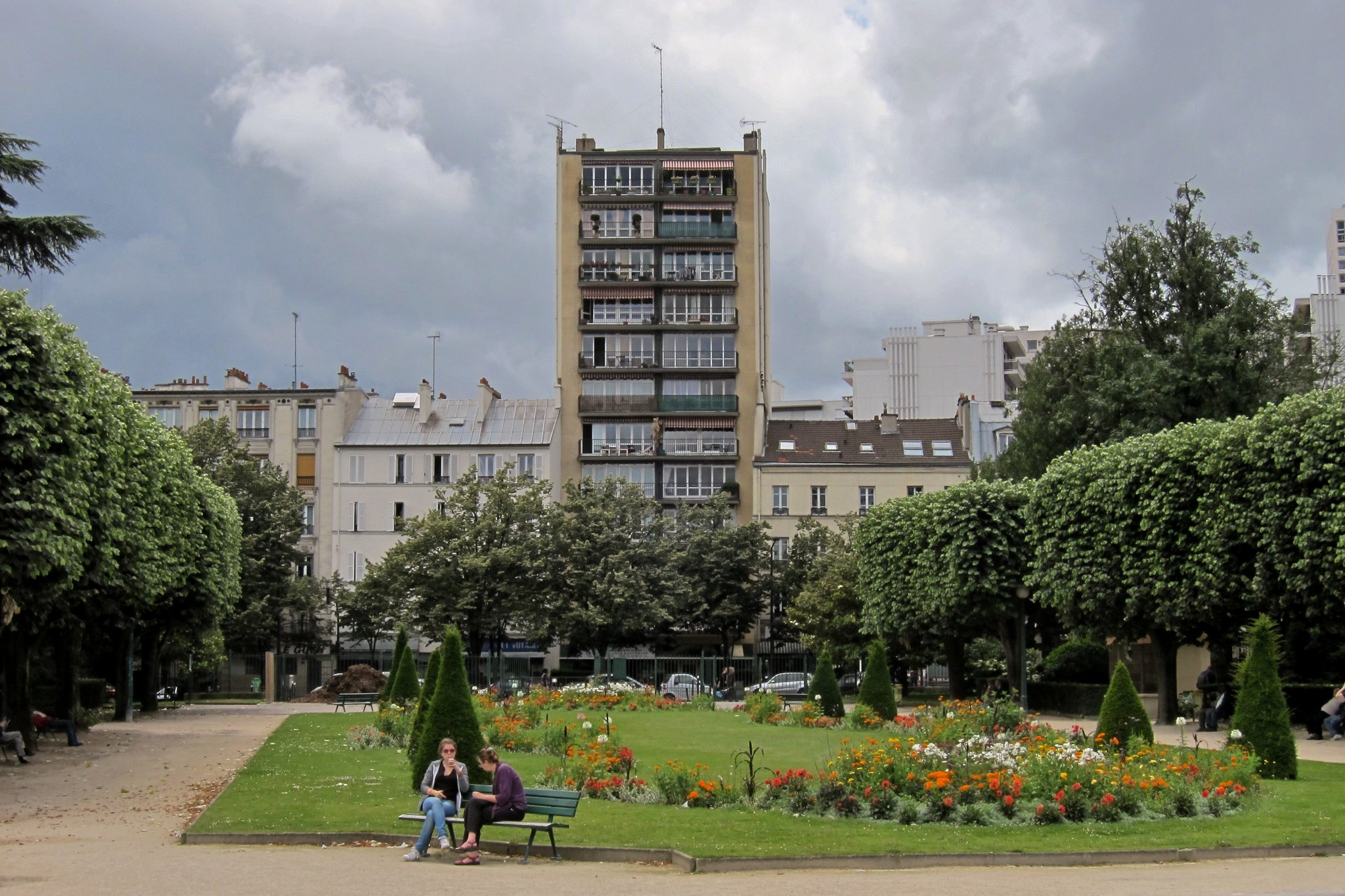
Flowerbeds in the Parc de Choisy

The Parc de Choisy (1937), like the Square Saint-Lambert in the 15th arrondissement (1933), was built on the site of a former gas factory. The designer was Édouard Crevel (1880-1969), who had become chief architect of the city of Paris in 1935. He was also the architect of the George Eastman Dental Institute (French: Institut dentaire George-Eastman), a dental college, next to the park. After World War II, he became architect of the Ministry of Reconstruction, rebuilding structures destroyed or damaged during the war.

Like other Paris parks of the 1930s, Most of the park was built as a modern version of the French formal garden of the 18th century, rather than the picturesque style of the parks of the Second Empire and the Third Republic. The Eastman Institute, at one end of the park, played the rôle of the château with which the central alley and rows of trees were aligned. Like a French formal garden, it had broad lawns and a large basin of water with fountains. The edges of the park were given more natural groves of trees, winding paths and a small stream, in the more traditional Second Empire style.

== Features ==
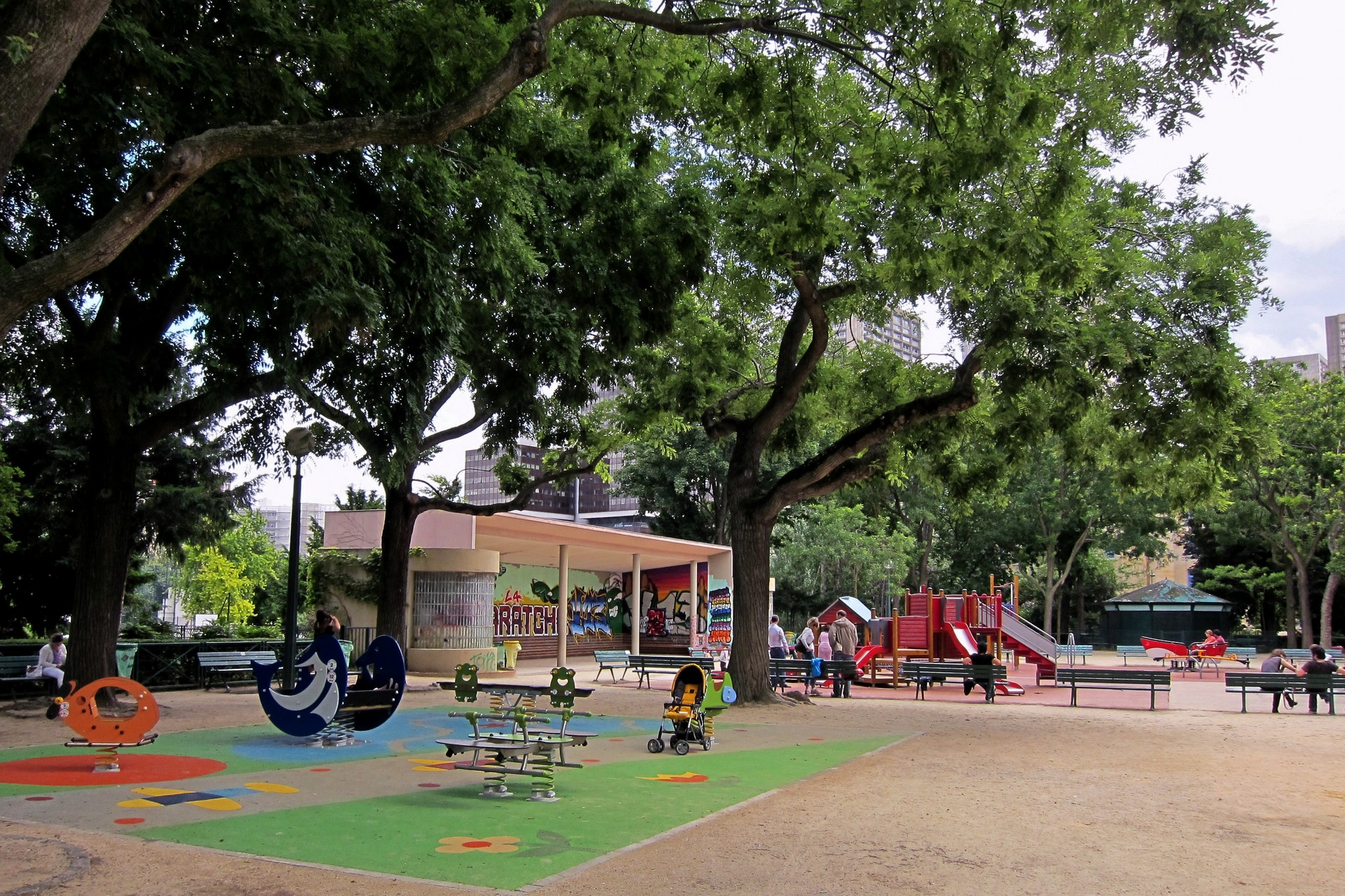
The playground of the park has classic 1930s architecture.

The park is a large rectangle between two avenues, with a Latin cross of paths lined by trees. The brick structure of the Eastman Institute is at one end, with the basin and fountains in front of it. One alley crosses the park from east to west, meeting the grand esplanade. Unlike the traditional formal French garden, the densest groves of trees are close to the "château", rather than at the most distant end. The park features a rich assortment of flowerbeds.

The park, like most Paris parks of the 1930s, has an open-air theater at one end. and two large playgrounds, with concrete structures in the style of the period. Near the entrance of the park on avenue Choisy, there is a round table made of granite which came from the Pavilion of Finland at the 1937 Paris Exhibition.
