= White House (disambiguation) =

The White House is the official residence of the president of the United States of America.

White House may also refer to the Executive Office of the President of the United States or any of the following:

== Buildings ==
=== Channel Islands ===
- White House (Herm), a hotel

=== Finland ===
- Tampere City Central Office Building (also nicknamed as "White House"), a government building in Tampere

=== Kyrgyzstan ===
- White House (Bishkek), a presidential building of the Kyrgyz Republic in Bishkek

=== Netherlands ===
- Witte Huis, a skyscraper in Rotterdam whose name means "White House"

=== Poland ===
- White House, Warsaw, an 18th-century royal villa-type residence

=== Russia ===
- White House, Kyshtym, a townhouse in Kyshtym
- White House (Moscow), a government building in Moscow
- White House (Orenburg), a government building in Orenburg

=== Switzerland ===
- The Blue and The White House (German: Blaues und Weisses Haus), two town mansions in Basel

=== United Kingdom ===
- Ty Gwyn ar Daf ("White House on the Taf"), where a parliament codified Welsh law in the 10th century
- The White House, Aston Munslow, a listed medieval hall house in Shropshire, England
- The White House, Edinburgh, a former roadhouse in Edinburgh, Scotland
- The White House, Poulton-le-Fylde, a listed building in Lancashire, England
- The White House, York, a listed former pub in North Yorkshire, England
- White House, County Down, a ruined 17th-century dwelling on the Ards Peninsula, Northern Ireland
- The White House, the manor house at Gilwell Park, headquarters of The Scout Association

=== United States ===
- First White House of the Confederacy, Montgomery, Alabama
- White House (Casa Grande, Arizona)
- White House (Helena, Arkansas)
- Little White House, Warm Springs, Georgia
- White House (Christianburg, Kentucky)
- White House (Mer Rouge, Louisiana)
- The White House (Hartwick, New York)
- White House (Syracuse, New York)
- White House (Huntsville, North Carolina)
- White House of the Chickasaws, Emet, Oklahoma
- White House (Rock Hill, South Carolina)
- White House (Bastrop, Texas)
- White House (Brentsville, Virginia)
- The White House (Luray, Virginia)
- White House of the Confederacy, Richmond, Virginia, where Jefferson Davis lived
- White House (plantation), near White House, Virginia, home of Martha Custis prior to her marriage to George Washington
- David White House, Washington, D.C.

== Entertainment ==
- White House (film), a 2010 Philippine film
- "White House", a song by The American Analog Set from their 1997 album From Our Living Room to Yours
- The White House (album), a 1995 album by The Dead C

== Places ==
- White House, Jamaica
- White House, New Jersey
- White House, Tennessee
- White House, Virginia
- White House, Page County, Virginia

== Other ==
- The White House (department store), San Francisco, California

== See also ==
- Whitehouse (disambiguation)
- White Houses (disambiguation)
- White House Farm (disambiguation)
- White Hall (disambiguation)
- Casablanca (disambiguation) (White House in Spanish and Italian)
- Maison Blanche (disambiguation)
