= Léon Grosse =

French civil engineering and construction company

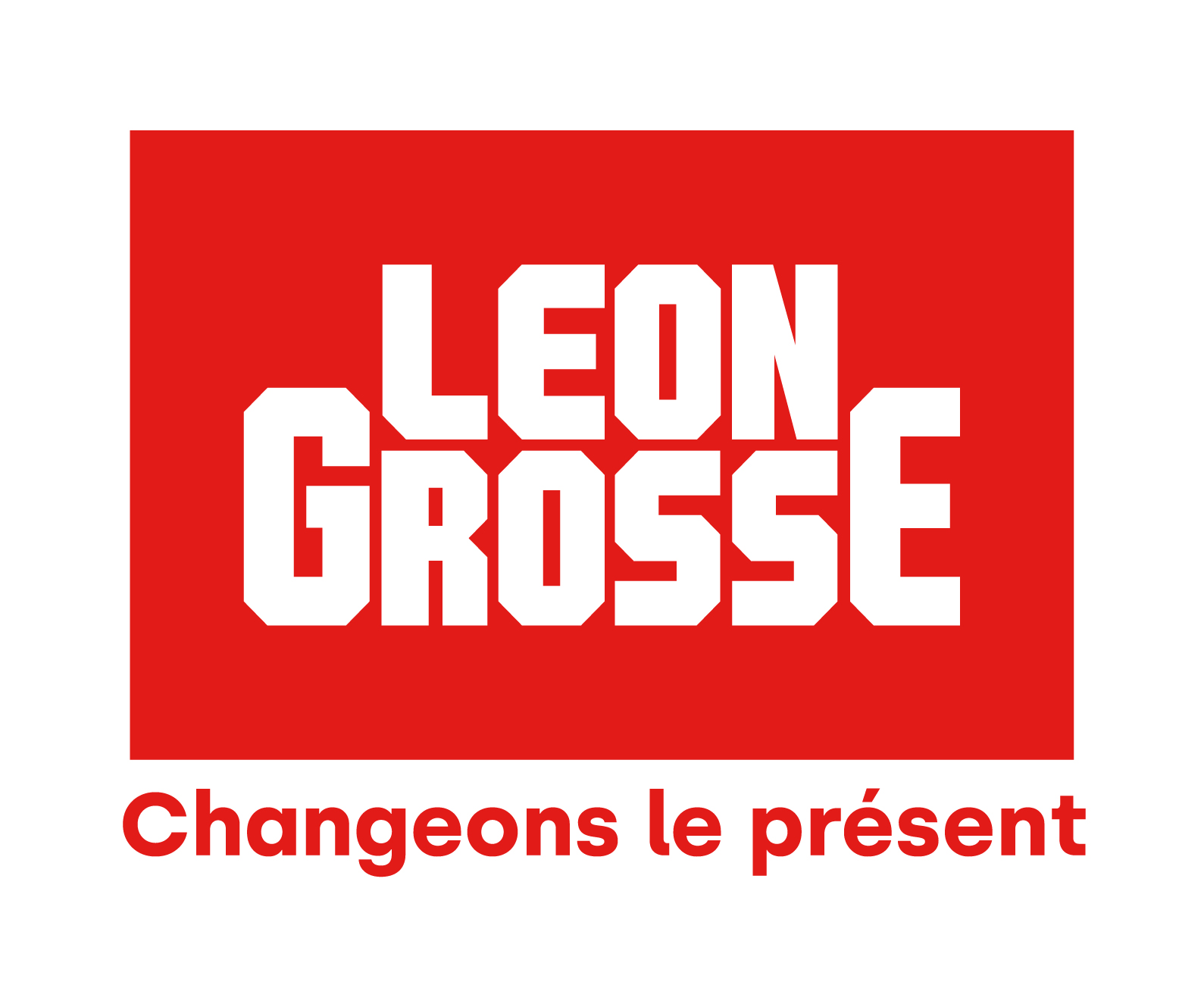
- Industry: Construction, Civil engineering
- Founded: 1881
- Founder: Léon Grosse
- Headquarters: Aix-les-Bains, France
- Key people: Léon Grosse, Bernard Bonnet, Bertrand Grosse, Olivier Grosse
- Revenue: 720 M€ (2014)
- Owner: Léon Grosse family
- Number of employees: 2,300
- Subsidiaries: Léon Grosse Nucléaire (LGN) Léon Grosse Eléctricité (LGE)
- Website: www.leongrosse.fr

Léon Grosse is a French civil engineering and construction firm. It is one of the leading actors on the French market, with a turnover of 720 M€ in 2014 and 2,300 employees. The company was founded by Léon Grosse in 1881 in Aix-Les-Bains and has remained a family-owned company since. It operates in France and its DOM-TOM.

The firm has delivered some prestigious projects such as the Stade Jean Bouin in Paris, the Satellite S4 of Paris Charles de Gaulle Airport, the tower of the European Parliament in Strasbourg or the TGV station of Lyon Saint-Exupéry Airport.
