= Parking Vélos Île-de-France Mobilités =

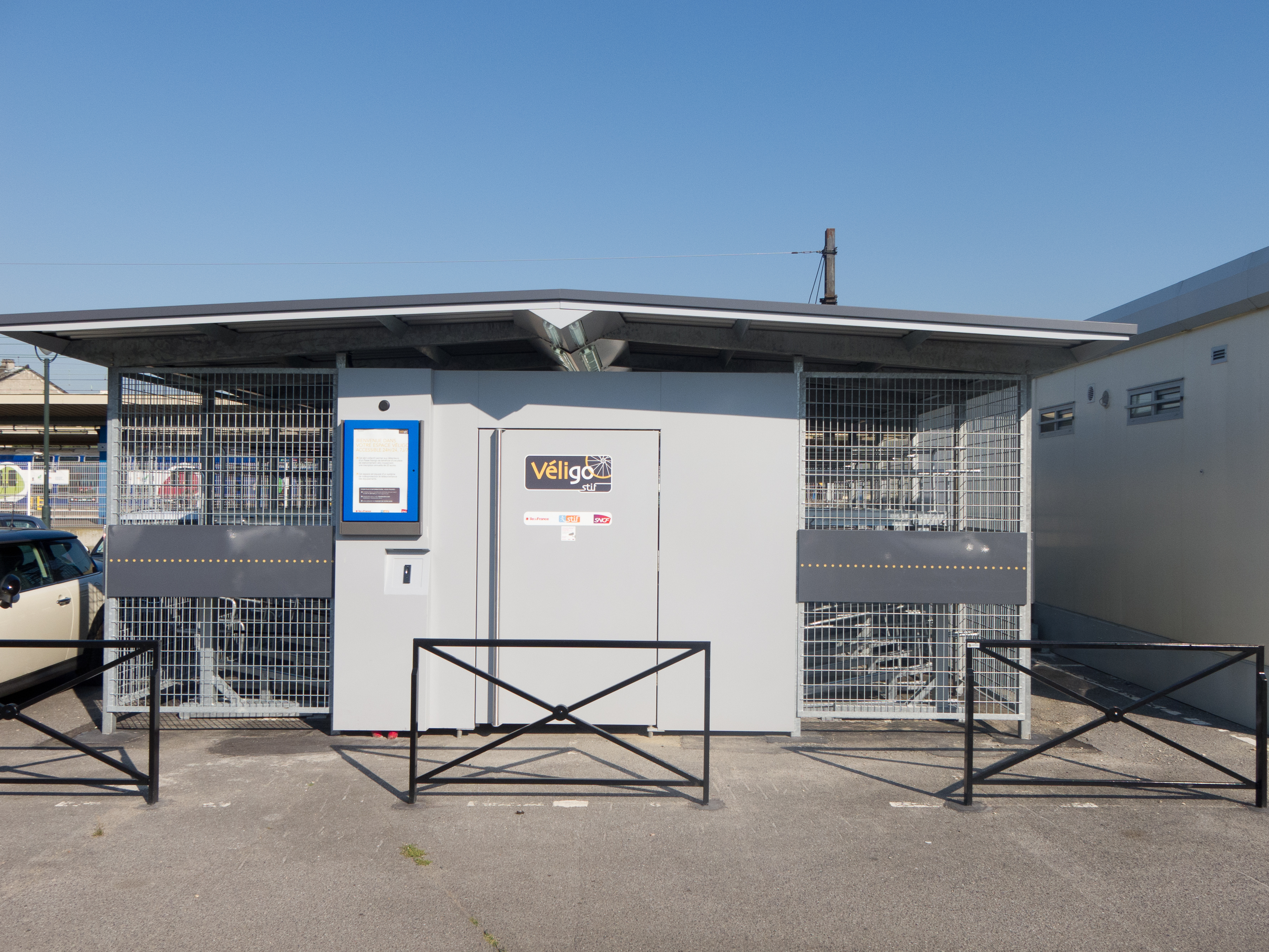
The Véligo shelter of the station of Corbeil-Essonnes .

Parking Vélos Île-de-France Mobilités, formerly Véligo, is a secure shelter service for bicycles available at stations in the Île-de-France region. It designates both a closed shelter, in the form of collective lockers, accessible via the Navigo pass, and an open shelter, freely accessible. The deployment of the device is coordinated by Île-de-France Mobilités.

== Presentation ==
The shelters have a capacity of 5 to 398 places. They are equipped with hoops to hang the frame and the wheels of the bicycles. The closed shelters are accessible only to the holders of a Navigo pass, for a subscription of 4€ per day, 10€ per week, or 30€ per year.

== See also ==
- Bicycle parking rack
- Bicycle theft
