= Casabianca, Tolima =

Coordinates: 5°05′N 75°07′W

- Municipality and town
- Flag Coat of arms

- Location of the municipality and town of Casabianca, Tolima in the Tolima Department of Colombia.
- Country: Colombia
- Department: Tolima Department

Government
  - Mayor: William Cardona Orozco

Area
  - Total: 181.66 km^{2} (70.14 sq mi)
- Elevation: 2,081 m (6,827 ft)

Population (2017)
  - Total: 6,639
  - Density: 36.55/km^{2} (94.65/sq mi)
- Time zone: UTC-5 (Colombia Standard Time)

Casabianca is a town and municipality in the Tolima Department of Colombia. The population of the municipality was 6,684 as of the 2015 census.
