= Casablanca (disambiguation) =

Casablanca ("White House" in Spanish) is a city in Morocco.

Casablanca or Casa Blanca may also refer to:

== Places ==
=== United States ===
- Casa Blanca, Arizona, a census-designated place in Arizona
- Casa Blanca, California, a neighborhood in Riverside, California
- Casa Blanca, New Mexico, an unincorporated community in Cibola County, New Mexico
- Casa Blanca, Puerto Rico, a house museum in San Juan
- Casa Blanca, Texas, an incorporated community in Texas
- Casa Blanca, Starr County, Texas
- Lake Casa Blanca near Laredo, Texas

=== Other countries ===
- Casablanca (volcano) a volcano in southern Chile
- Casablanca, Chile, a municipality in the region of Valparaiso
  - Casablanca Valley, a wine region in Chile
- Casablanca, Havana, a suburb of Havana, Cuba
- Camp Casablanca, a military base in Kosovo
- Grand Casablanca, a region in Morocco which includes the city of Casablanca
- Universidad Casa Blanca, a private university in Culiacán, Sinaloa, Mexico

== Arts, entertainment, and media ==
=== Film ===
- Casablanca (film), a 1942 film starring Humphrey Bogart and Ingrid Bergman
- Casablanca (2019 film), an Egyptian film starring Ghada Adel, Amir Karara and Eyad Nassar

=== Music ===
- Casablanca (band), a Swedish group
- Casablanca (album), by The Saints
- Bümpliz – Casablanca, an album by Züri West
- "Casablanca", a 1982 song by Bertie Higgins from Just Another Day in Paradise
- "Casablanca", a 2007 song by Emarosa from This Is Your Way Out
- "Casablanca", a 2015 song by Markus Feehily from Fire
- "Casablanca", a 2018 song by Saad Lamjarred
- "Casablanca", a 2026 song by Gorillaz from their album The Mountain
- Casablanca Records, a record label

=== Television ===
- Casablanca (1955 TV series), an American television series
- Casablanca (1983 TV series), an American television series
- "Casablanca" (Get Smart), an episode of Get Smart

=== Other uses in arts, entertainment, and media ===
- Casablanca (novella), a 2006 novella based on the film
- "Casablanca", a 1967 short story by Thomas Disch

== People ==
- David Casablanca (born 1977), Spanish retired footballer
- Ted Casablanca (born 1960), American entertainment journalist

== Ships ==
- Casablanca-class escort carriers, a United States Navy World War II ship class
  - USS Casablanca, lead ship of the class

== Sports ==
- Raja Casablanca, a Moroccan professional football club
- Wydad Casablanca, a Moroccan sports club

== Other uses ==
- Casa Blanca Case, arbitrated by Louis Renault in 1909
- Casablanca (beer), a Moroccan beer brand
- Casablanca Conference, a 1943 conference to plan the European strategy of the Allies during World War II
  - Casablanca directive, a World War II Allied aerial bombing directive issued shortly after the Casablanca Conference
- Casablanca Fan Company, a ceiling fan company
- Casablanca Group, a defunct organization of progressive states

== Variants ==
- Kazablan, an Israeli play whose main character hails from Casablanca
  - Kazablan (1973 film), a 1973 adaptation of the play

== See also ==
- Casabianca (disambiguation)
- Casablancas, a surname
- Chazablanca, an album by Chaz Jankel
- José Raúl Capablanca, Cuban chess player
