= August 1903 =

Month in 1903

<<	August 1903					>>
Su	Mo	Tu	We	Th	Fr	Sa
						1
2	3	4	5	6	7	8
9	10	11	12	13	14	15
16	17	18	19	20	21	22
23	24	25	26	27	28	29
30	31

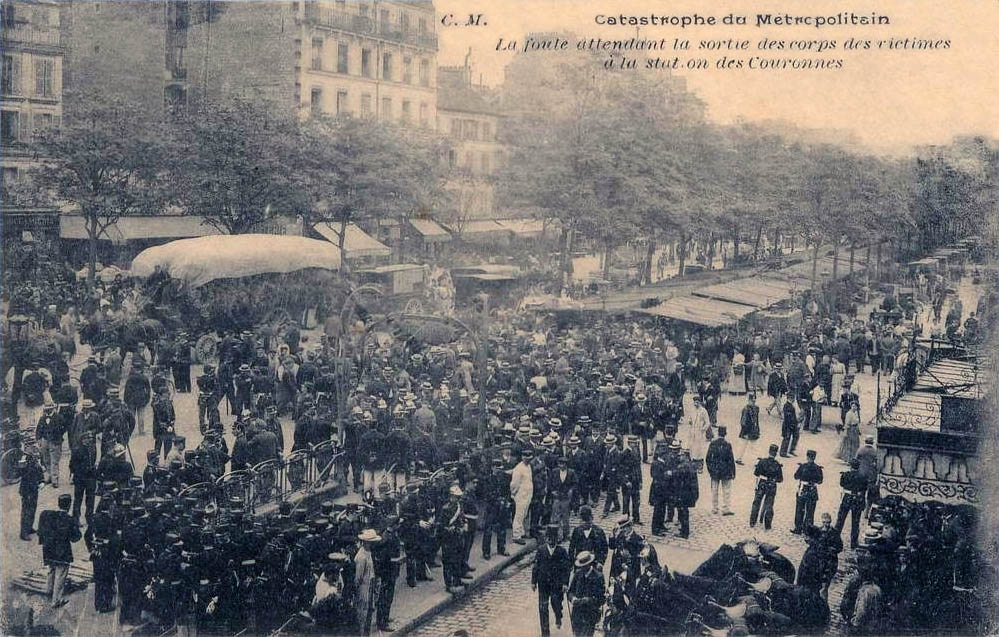
August 10, 1903: Removal of bodies after the Paris Métro train fire

The following events occurred in August 1903:

== August 1, 1903 (Saturday) ==
- Polish Cardinal Jan Puzyna de Kosielsko issued a veto (jus exclusivae) against the nomination of the front runner, Cardinal Mariano Rampolla, in the name of Emperor Franz Josef I of Austria. The veto was refused, but Rampolla lost some of his support.
- Died: Calamity Jane (Martha Jane Canary), frontierswoman and professional scout, 51 (alcohol-related inflammation of the bowel and/or pneumonia)
- Portuguese football Club Boavista F.C. was formed on this day.

== August 2, 1903 (Sunday) ==
- The Ilinden–Preobrazhenie Uprising, organized by the Secret Macedonian-Adrianople Revolutionary Organization, broke out in the Ottoman provinces of Macedonia and Adrianople.
- Pittencrieff Park in Dunfermline, Scotland, was gifted to the people of the town by Dunfermline native Andrew Carnegie.
- The US schooner Tennie and Laura capsized and sank in Lake Michigan, 9 nautical miles (17 km) off Port Washington, Wisconsin. One of the two crew members was killed.
- Göteborgs IF won the final of Sweden's 1903 Svenska Mästerskapet football tournament.

== August 3, 1903 (Monday) ==
- Born:
  - Habib Bourguiba, Tunisian lawyer and politician, President of Tunisia 1957–1987, in Monastir (official birth date) (d. 2000)
  - Fahri Korutürk, Turkish naval officer and politician, President of Turkey 1973–80, in Constantinople, Ottoman Empire (d. 1987)

== August 4, 1903 (Tuesday) ==
- After five rounds of voting by the papal conclave, Pope Pius X (Giuseppe Melchiorre Sarto) succeeded Pope Leo XIII, becoming the 257th pope.
- Born: Helen Kane, US singer, in New York City (died 1966)

== August 5, 1903 (Wednesday) ==
- Born: Prince Nicholas of Romania, second son of King Ferdinand I of Romania and his wife Queen Marie, at Peleş Castle, Sinaia (died 1978)

== August 6, 1903 (Thursday) ==
- King Edward VII of the United Kingdom appointed Henry Northcote, 1st Baron Northcote, as the next Governor-General of Australia, with effect from January 1904.
- Police action forced the 2nd Congress of the Russian Social Democratic Labour Party, presided over by Lenin, to relocate from Brussels, Belgium, to London, UK.
- The second tropical cyclone of the season was observed east of the Windward Islands.

== August 7, 1903 (Friday) ==
- Over 20 people died in a rear end crash between two circus trains in Durand, Michigan. Chief Special Agent Albert W. Large of the Grand Trunk Railroad Police Department was killed, and another special agent was seriously injured in the crash, which was caused by failure of the second train's air brakes.
- Born: Louis Leakey, Kenyan paleoanthropologist and archaeologist, in Kabete, East Africa Protectorate (d. 1972)

== August 8, 1903 (Saturday) ==
- The British government wrote to other parties involved in the Berlin Conference of 1884–5, with details of abuses and atrocities in the Congo for which King Leopold II of Belgium was deemed responsible.
- During a Philadelphia Phillies home game at Baker Bowl, a balcony collapsed, killing four people and injuring many more. The Phillies temporarily moved to Columbia Park pending repairs.

== August 9, 1903 (Sunday) ==
- At his coronation ceremony, Pope Pius X shocked his entourage by wearing a simple pectoral cross made of gilded metal, which he said was the only one he owned.
- The tropical storm observed on August 6 struck Martinique, leaving thousands homeless in Fort-de-France and surrounding villages. Eight people were killed.
- Kerry GAA defeated Cork GAA in the semi-final of the All-Ireland Senior Football Championship - Munster division at Millstreet.

== August 10, 1903 (Monday) ==
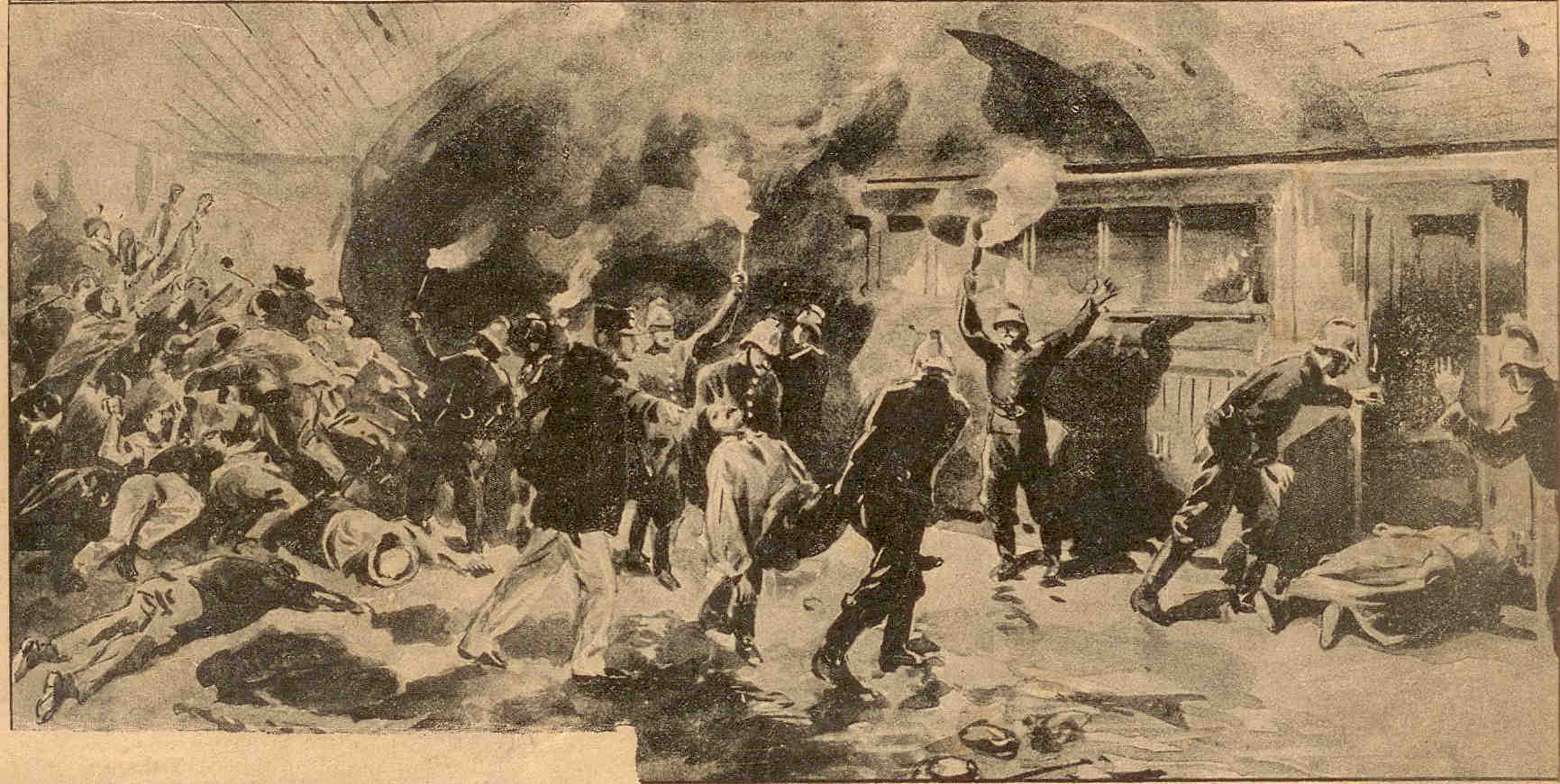
August 10, 1903: Couronnes Disaster in Paris

- Paris Métro train fire: After several attempts to extinguish a fire on the wooden-bodied Train 43–52, the flames got out of control and 84 people were killed, most at Couronnes station.
- The Oseberg Ship, a 9th-century Viking ship, was discovered in a large burial mound at a farm near Tønsberg, Vestfold, Norway.

== August 11, 1903 (Tuesday) ==
- Two people were killed when an earthquake of magnitude 8.1 struck Kythera, Greece.
- A hurricane struck Jamaica, devastating the island's northern shore and wrecking several ships. Between 65 and 90 people were killed.
- Charles Sullivan and John H. Powell shot and killed Special Policeman Robert A. Sample on Folsom Street in San Francisco, California. Sullivan would be convicted of second-degree murder in December; Powell would be convicted of manslaughter on January 2, 1904.
- Died: Eugenio María de Hostos, 64, Puerto Rican lawyer, philosopher and campaigner

== August 12, 1903 (Wednesday) ==
- The hurricane that struck Jamaica on August 11 reached the Cayman Islands, destroying 200 homes and seven churches on Grand Cayman alone.

== August 13, 1903 (Thursday) ==
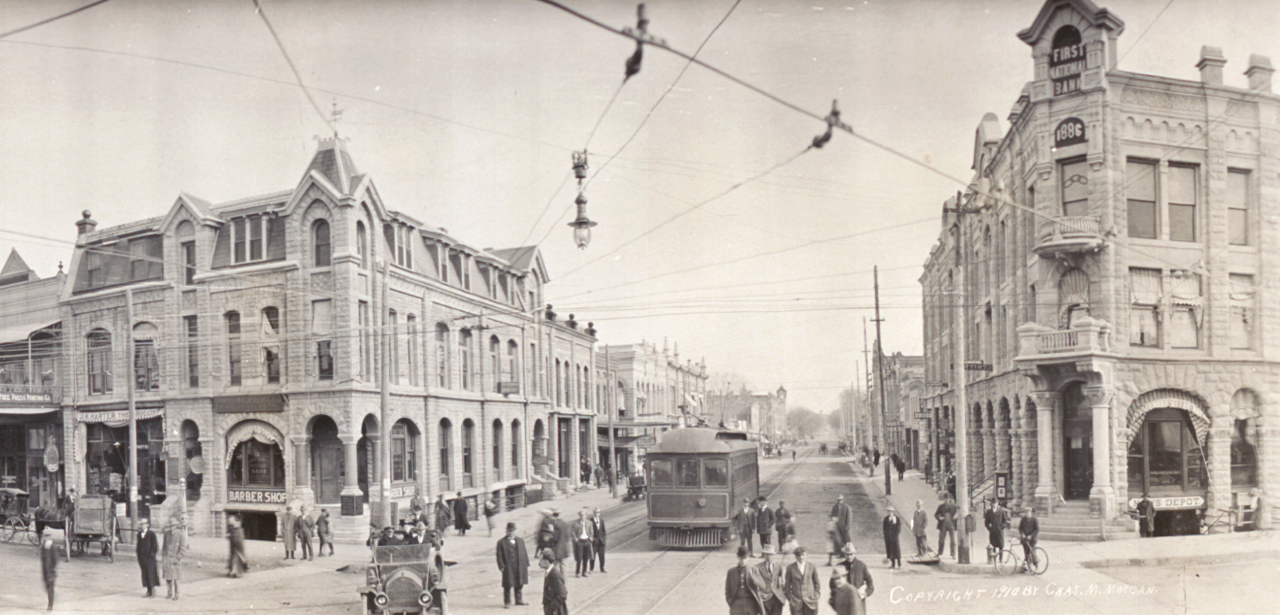
The site of the killing in Winfield at the corner of Ninth and Main, on the right

- A gunman, Gilbert Twigg, killed nine people and wounded 25 others in a mass shooting in Winfield, Kansas, at the time a town of 6,000 people. A crowd of more than 2,000 people was watching a concert by a military band at the corner of Ninth Avenue and Main Street when Twigg fired at random at the audience with a double-barreled shotgun, killing men ranging in age from 15 to 35 years old before killing himself.
- Boxer Frankie Neil won the world bantamweight championship by defeating the reigning titlist, Harry Forbes, with a knockout in the second round at a bout at the Mechanics' Pavilion in San Francisco.
- In Berlin, the Preliminary Conference on Wireless Telegraphy concluded with an agreement among nine nations— Germany, Austria, France, Hungary, Italy, Russia, Spain, the United Kingdom and the United States— on setting worldwide standards for the new technology of wireless telegraphy.
- In the Russian Empire, Admiral Yevgeni Alekseyev was appointed by the Tsar Nicholas II as the Viceroy of the Russian Far East.

== August 14, 1903 (Friday) ==
- The Land Purchase (Ireland) Act 1903 was passed in the House of Commons of the United Kingdom, encouraging landlords to sell their Irish estates to tenants.

== August 15, 1903 (Saturday) ==
- The post of Commanding General of the United States Army was replaced by that of Chief of Staff of the Army; Samuel Baldwin Marks Young was the first to take the new title.

== August 16, 1903 (Sunday) ==
- The hurricane that had already devastated Jamaica dissipated over San Luis Potosí, Mexico, where it caused significant flooding in the area between Tampico and Cárdenas.

== August 17, 1903 (Monday) ==
- The Great Western Railway became the first British railway company to operate its own road motor services when it began running buses between Helston and The Lizard in Cornwall.

== August 18, 1903 (Tuesday) ==
- German inventor Karl Jatho got his motorized heavier-than-air aircraft up to 200 feet (60 m) above the ground.

== August 19, 1903 (Wednesday) ==
- Born: James Gould Cozzens, American novelist, in Chicago (d. 1978)

== August 20, 1903 (Thursday) ==
- In the first of three races for the 1903 America's Cup, the American yacht Reliance, skippered by Charlie Barr and sponsored by the New York Yacht Club, defeated the United Kingdom's challenger, Shamrock III, sponsored by the Royal Ulster Yacht Club.. Reliance won the second and third races on August 25 and September 3, to retain America's possession of the Cup.

== August 21, 1903 (Friday) ==
- Captain Robert Falcon Scott, on his first Antarctic expedition, observed that the expedition's second long polar night had ended when he saw the sun's rim above the northern horizon.

== August 22, 1903 (Saturday) ==
- Died: Robert Gascoyne-Cecil, 3rd Marquess of Salisbury, 73, three time Prime Minister of the United Kingdom

== August 23, 1903 (Sunday) ==
- The Australian screw steamer Narara caught fire at her moorings at Sackville, New South Wales, Australia, and was scuttled. The ship would later be refloated, repaired, and returned to service.

== August 24, 1903 (Monday) ==
- Laurence Doherty defeated William Clothier 6–3, 6–2, 6–3 in the Final of the U.S. Men's National Singles Championship, which took place a day late because of rain the previous day.
- Born: Graham Sutherland, English artist, in Streatham (d. 1980)

== August 25, 1903 (Tuesday) ==
- The Judiciary Act was passed in the Australian parliament, regulating the structure of Australia's judicial system and conferring jurisdiction on Australian federal courts.
- Teresa Urrea's home in Los Angeles, United States, where she had been supporting Mexican workers, was destroyed by fire.

== August 26, 1903 (Wednesday) ==
- The Second Philippine Commission, established in Manila by U.S. Military Governor William Howard Taft, passed the Pensionado Act, establishing a scholarship fund for 100 Filipino students to attend schools in the United States.

== August 27, 1903 (Thursday) ==
- Lord Northcote, Governor of Bombay, informed Lord George Hamilton that he and his wife were leaving India.

== August 28, 1903 (Friday) ==
- A reception was held at Poona, India, for the outgoing Governor of Bombay, Lord Northcote, with an estimated 7,000 people in attendance.

== August 29, 1903 (Saturday) ==
- George Ade's play, The County Chairman, was performed for the first time, at the Auditorium in South Bend, Indiana, United States.

== August 30, 1903 (Sunday) ==
- In the British colony of Rhodesia (now Zimbabwe), Chief Kadungure Mapondera of the Shona people, surrendered to the colonial administrators of the British South Africa Company after having waged a guerrilla war against European settlers from 1900 to 1902. Mapondera was sentenced to seven years of hard labor for murder and sedition, and died within a year.
- Near Rotorua in New Zealand, the sudden eruption of the Waimangu Geyser killed four tourists who had ventured to the edge of the geyser and ignored warnings from tour guide Alfred Warbrick to return to a safe distance. Alfred's brother, rugby union national team member Joe Warbrick was scalded to death, along with David McNaughton and sisters Ruby and Catherine Nicholls. The four were then swept away by a more violent eruption.
- In the U.S. city of Omaha, Nebraska, the Capitol Avenue Market House, built and owned by the city, opened for business with dozens of stalls for produce sellers, along with a restaurant. Despite passage of a city ordinance requiring sellers to relocate to Capitol Avenue, the Omaha Retailer Grocers' Association ignored the law and its members continued to sell from stalls in the old warehouse district. The Market House remained empty and closed in less than a year.

== August 31, 1903 (Monday) ==
- At Mount Vernon, workers began waterproofing the limestone tomb of George Washington with a vulcanizing process.
- Born: Arthur Godfrey, American broadcaster, in Manhattan (d. 1983)
