= September 1903 =

Month in 1903

<<	September 1903					>>
Su	Mo	Tu	We	Th	Fr	Sa
		1	2	3	4	5
6	7	8	9	10	11	12
13	14	15	16	17	18	19
20	21	22	23	24	25	26
27	28	29	30

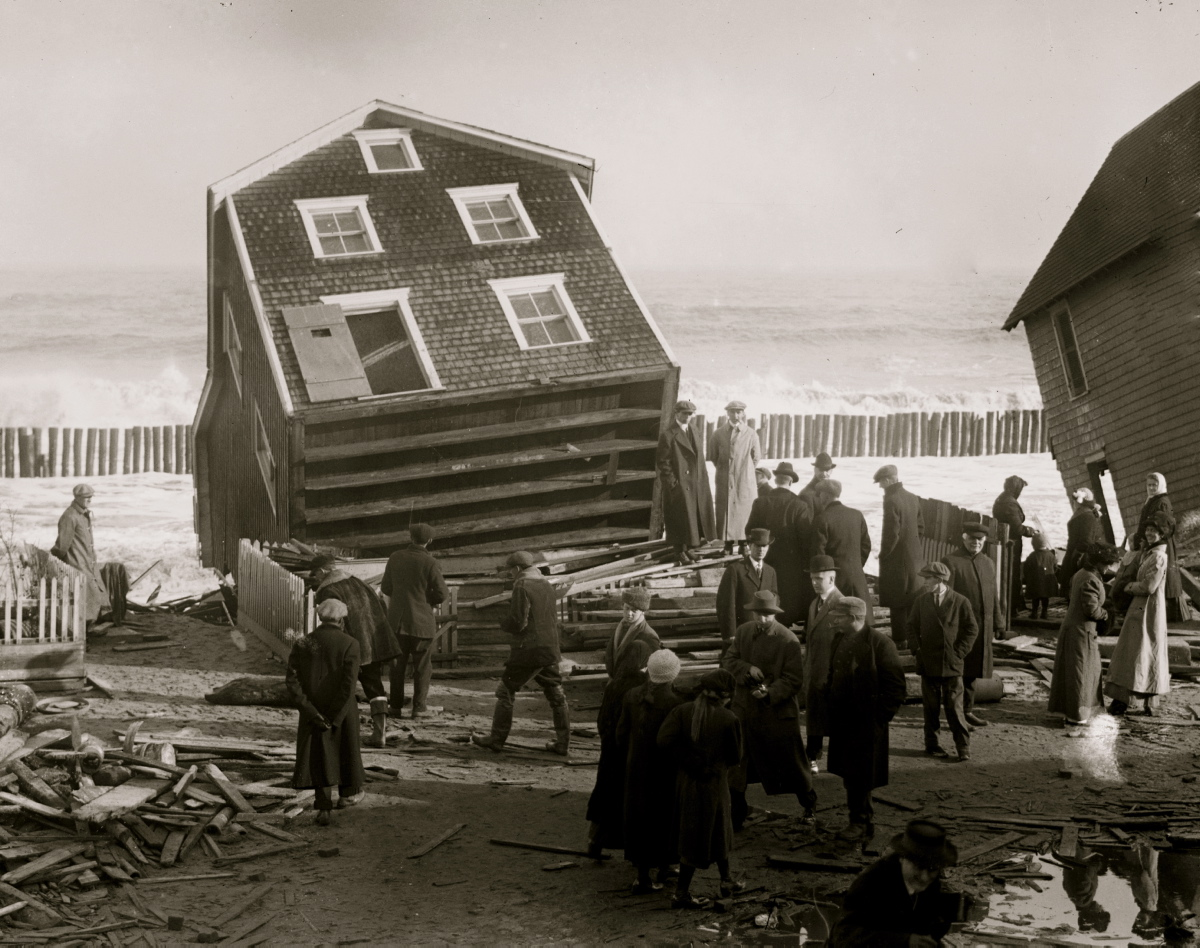
September 16, 1903: Damage from the 1903 New Jersey hurricane

The following events occurred in September 1903:

== September 1, 1903 (Tuesday) ==
- At Dover, England, British swimmer Montague Holbein began his fourth attempt to swim across the English Channel.
- A miners' strike in Idaho Springs, Colorado, United States, that started on May 1, was brought to an end by the Western Federation of Miners.
- Henry Weilbrenner, a farmer from Syosset, Long Island, New York, attempted to assassinate U.S. President Theodore Roosevelt at Sagamore Hill. A United States Secret Service agent foiled the attempt by knocking Weilbrenner's revolver from his hand. Two other men were heard prowling about the grounds at the same time, but Weilbrenner claimed to have acted alone. He would be declared insane on September 2.

== September 2, 1903 (Wednesday) ==
- Montague Holbein abandoned his attempt to swim across the English Channel after the tide turned when he was within 4 miles (6.4 km) of the French coast.
- Born: Fred Pratt Green, British Methodist minister and hymn writer; in Roby, Lancashire (d. 2000)
- Died: Julia McNair Wright, 63, American author

== September 3, 1903 (Thursday) ==
- Reliance, entered by the New York Yacht Club, defeated Shamrock III, representing the Royal Ulster Yacht Club, successfully defending the 1903 America's Cup.

== September 4, 1903 (Friday) ==
- In Widewater, Virginia, a prospective test flight of the Langley Aerodrome was abandoned due to the accidental destruction of the aircraft's port propeller during engine testing. Charles M. Manly, the Aerodrome's test pilot, prevented more serious damage to the aircraft by shutting the engine down. The Aerodrome would make two unsuccessful test flights on October 7 and December 8.
- In Armourdale, Kansas, an unidentified African American man attempted to strangle Mrs. Margaret Gerahn, a white woman. A mob pursued the man to the Kansas River, where he drowned himself in order to avoid being lynched.
- At the Selma, California, post office, J. E. Harris, former Chief of the San Diego Police Department, threatened surveyor W. H. Shafer with a shotgun while under the influence of alcohol. Shafer, who was involved in a dispute with Harris over wood that they both claimed, shot Harris to death with a revolver.
- Died: Hermann Zumpe, 53, German conductor and composer, died of apoplexy.

== September 5, 1903 (Saturday) ==
- Irish painter Henry Jones Thaddeus received permission to paint a portrait of Pope Pius X.
- Dick Molyneux became manager of Brentford football club, leaders of the UK's Southern League First Division.

== September 6, 1903 (Sunday) ==
- The U.S. Revenue Cutter Service ship USRC Manning rescued all 38 passengers and eight crew of the schooner Abbie M. Deering, which had wrecked on one of the Fox Islands in the Alaskan Territory, and delivered them to safety in Unalaska.

== September 7, 1903 (Monday) ==
- Arthur Rowley, playing for Burslem Port Vale against Bolton Wanderers, became the first player in British football history to score from a direct free kick.
- The Federation of American Motorcyclists was founded in New York City.
- Born:
  - Dorothy Marie Donnelly, American poet (d. 1994)
  - Shimaki Kensaku, Japanese author (d. 1945)
  - John "Nap" Kloza, Polish professional baseball player and manager (d. 1962)

== September 8, 1903 (Tuesday) ==
- Boxer Joe Riley (also known as Oliver Knight) collapsed after a six-round fight with Griff Jones in Philadelphia, Pennsylvania. He would die at St. Agnes Hospital on September 10.
- Anderson Garred, an escapee from the Mendocino State Asylum, shot and killed Andrew J. McKinnon, a former Oregon county sheriff, in Guerneville, California. Garred would be captured on December 22 near Red Bluff, California. On May 13, 1904, a jury would pronounce Garred insane.
- Born: Jane Arbor, British author (d. 1994)

== September 9, 1903 (Wednesday) ==
- 18-year-old Special Agent Andrew Creason of the Chicago, Rock Island and Pacific Railway Police Department was assaulted at the railroad's coal and material yard in Chickasha, Oklahoma. Creason was struck on the head with a blunt object, causing multiple fractures to his skull. He would remain unconscious at the company hospital until his death on September 19. No suspects would ever be identified in Creason's murder.
- Texas State University opened in San Marcos, Texas, United States, with Thomas G. Harris as its principal and around 300 students.
- Born:
  - Lev Shankovsky, Ukrainian military historian (d. 1995)
  - Edward Upward, English author (d. 2009)
  - Phyllis A. Whitney, American mystery writer; in Yokohama, Japan (died 2008)

== September 10, 1903 (Thursday) ==
- Born: Cyril Connolly, English critic; in Coventry (died 1974)

== September 11, 1903 (Friday) ==
- An Atlantic hurricane struck Fort Lauderdale, Florida, United States, resulting in 14 deaths and extensive damage.
- The Milwaukee Mile racetrack in West Allis, Wisconsin, United States, then a dirt track, held its first motor race.
- Born: Theodor W. Adorno, German philosopher and sociologist; in Frankfurt am Main, as Theodor Ludwig Wiesengrund (died 1969)

== September 12, 1903 (Saturday) ==
- The U.S. armored cruiser USS Maryland was launched at Newport News Shipbuilding, Virginia.
- Arthur Schnitzler's one-act play, Der Puppenspieler ("The Puppet Master"), was premièred at the Deutsches Theater in Berlin, Germany.

== September 13, 1903 (Sunday) ==
- Vladimir Lenin wrote to Alexander Potresov, apologising for his irascible behaviour but refusing to accept that his recent decisions might be wrong.
- Born:
  - Claudette Colbert, American actress, in Saint-Mandé, France, as Émilie Claudette Chauchoin (died 1996)
  - Alberta Williams King (born Alberta Christine Williams), American civil rights activist, wife of Martin Luther King Sr., and mother of Martin Luther King Jr.; in Atlanta (assassinated 1974)
- Died: Carl Schuch, 56, Austrian painter, died of degenerative disease.

== September 14, 1903 (Monday) ==
- The Serbian football club FK Šumadija 1903 was founded in Kragujevac.
- British prime minister Arthur Balfour agreed to the resignation from the Cabinet of Joseph Chamberlain, the Secretary of State for the Colonies, over the issue of free trade.
- Died: Alice Gordon Gulick, 56, American missionary in Spain, died of tuberculosis.

== September 15, 1903 (Tuesday) ==
- European immigrants Andy Fairbank and Paul Cochlin founded the Brazilian football club Grêmio Foot-Ball Porto Alegrense in Porto Alegre.
- Born:
  - Roy Acuff, American country musician (d. 1992)
  - Yisrael Kristal, Polish-born Israeli supercentenarian, Holocaust survivor, and former world's oldest living man (d. 2017)

== September 16, 1903 (Wednesday) ==
- The 1903 New Jersey hurricane made landfall near Atlantic City, United States, with winds of 80 mph (130 km/h). It is the only hurricane ever known to have hit the state of New Jersey.
- Born: Rabbi Yosef Greenwald to his father Rabbi Yaakov Yehezkiya Greenwald; in Brezovica (Hungary) (d. 1984)

== September 17, 1903 (Thursday) ==
- Born: Karel Miljon, Dutch boxer; in Amsterdam (d. 1984)

== September 18, 1903 (Friday) ==
- Died: Alexander Bain, 85, Scottish philosopher

== September 19, 1903 (Saturday) ==
- John Devoy launched a weekly newspaper, the Gaelic American, in New York, United States.

== September 20, 1903 (Sunday) ==
- Born: Gertrud Arndt, German photographer; in Ratibor, Upper Silesia (d. 2000)

== September 21, 1903 (Monday) ==
- A solar eclipse took place.
- In the Serbian parliamentary elections, Sava Grujić of the People's Radical Party won enough votes to form a government in coalition with several independent members.
- Born: Preston Tucker, American automobile designer (d. 1956)

== September 22, 1903 (Tuesday) ==
- Odds BK won the 1903 Norwegian Football Cup Final.
- Italo Marchiony, an ice cream salesman from New York, United States, filed for a patent of a machine to manufacture ice cream cones.
- Died: Nicholas John Brown, 64, Australian politician, Speaker of the Tasmanian House of Assembly

== September 23, 1903 (Wednesday) ==
- Died: Charles B. Farwell, 80, former United States Senator from Illinois, died of heart disease.

== September 24, 1903 (Thursday) ==
- Edmund Barton, after experiencing health concerns, resigned as Prime Minister of Australia to join the newly established High Court of Australia as a judge. He was replaced by Alfred Deakin.
- British warship HMS Hampshire was launched at Armstrong Whitworth's Elswick shipyard.

== September 25, 1903 (Friday) ==
- An earthquake of magnitude 6.5 struck Razavi Khorasan Province, Persia, killing 350 people.
- Born:
  - Abul A'la Maududi, Pakistani journalist, theologian, and philosopher (d. 1979)
  - Mark Rothko, Latvian/US painter; in Dvinsk, as Markus Yakovlevich Rothkowitz (d. 1970)

== September 26, 1903 (Saturday) ==
- New Zealand became the first country in the world to pass a Wireless Telegraphy Act.

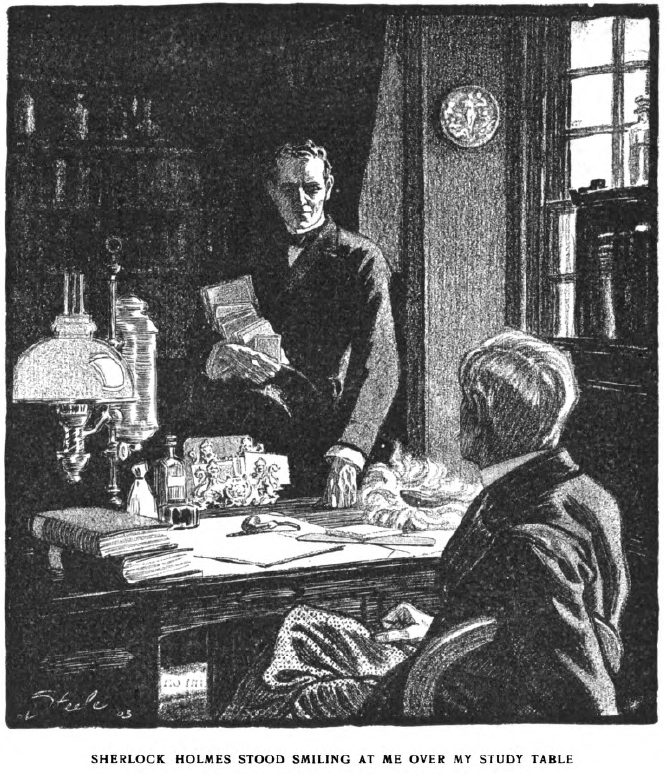
Sherlock Holmes, back from the dead in "The Adventure of the Empty House"

- The Sherlock Holmes short story "The Adventure of the Empty House" by Sir Arthur Conan Doyle was published for the first time in Collier's in the United States. This is the story in which Holmes returns after his apparent death in "The Adventure of the Final Problem".

== September 27, 1903 (Sunday) ==
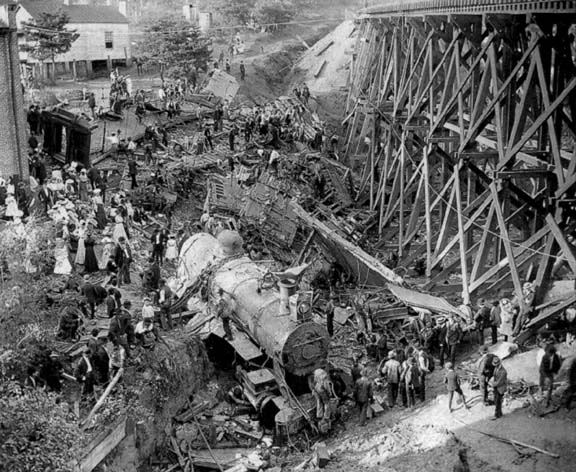
Aftermath of the "Wreck of the Old 97"

- En route from Monroe, Virginia, to Spencer, North Carolina, the "Fast Mail", travelling too fast in order to keep to its timetable, became derailed at the Stillhouse Trestle near Danville, Virginia, United States. Eleven people were killed and seven injured in the disaster, which would become known as the "Wreck of the Old 97".
- Born: Leonard Barr, American stand-up comic, actor and dancer (d. 1980)

== September 28, 1903 (Monday) ==
- Born: Tateo Katō, Japanese fighter ace; in Asahikawa, Hokkaido, Japan (d. 1942, killed in action)
- Died: Samuel A. Ward, 54, American organist and composer, author of the best-known melody for "America the Beautiful"

== September 29, 1903 (Tuesday) ==
- Prussia, part of the German Empire, introduced compulsory driver licensing for motor vehicles.
- Born:
  - Miguel Alemán Valdés, Mexican lawyer and civilian president (1946–1952) (d. 1983)
  - Ted de Corsia, American actor; in New York City (d. 1973)

== September 30, 1903 (Wednesday) ==
- Field Marshal Sir Evelyn Wood opened new school buildings at Gresham's School, Norfolk, England.
- British boxer Bob Fitzsimmons defeated Irishman Con Coughlin by knockout in the first round of a bout at the Washington Sporting Club in Philadelphia, Pennsylvania. Coughlin would die the following day of head injuries sustained in the fight.
- Born: Lyle Goodhue, American chemist, inventor and entomologist; in Jasper County, Iowa (d. 1981)
