= Paris Metro train fire =

1903 train fire in Paris, France

Coordinates: 48.869274°N 2.380155°E

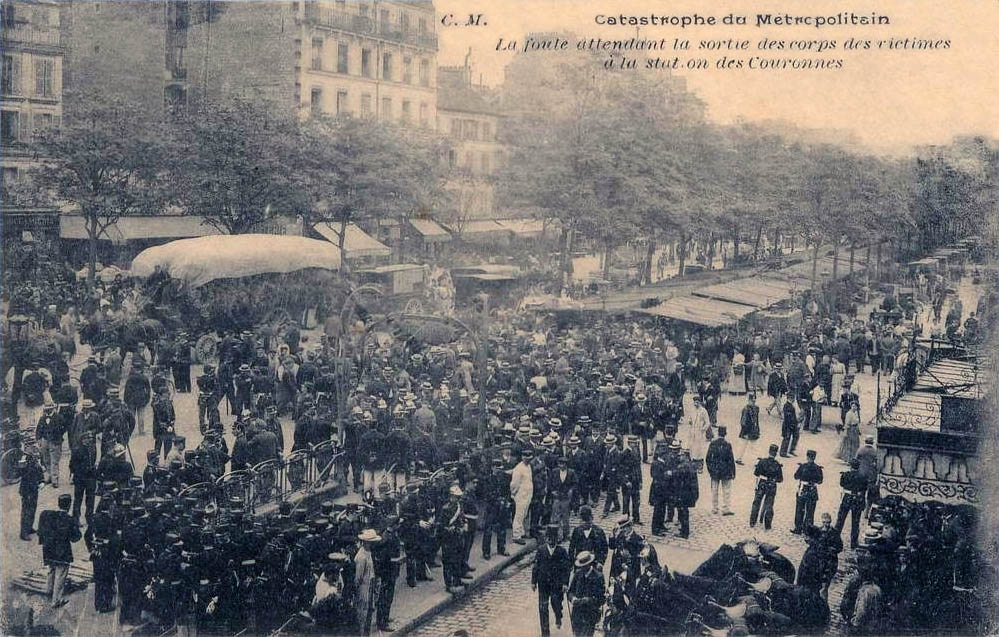
Removal of victims' bodies after the fire

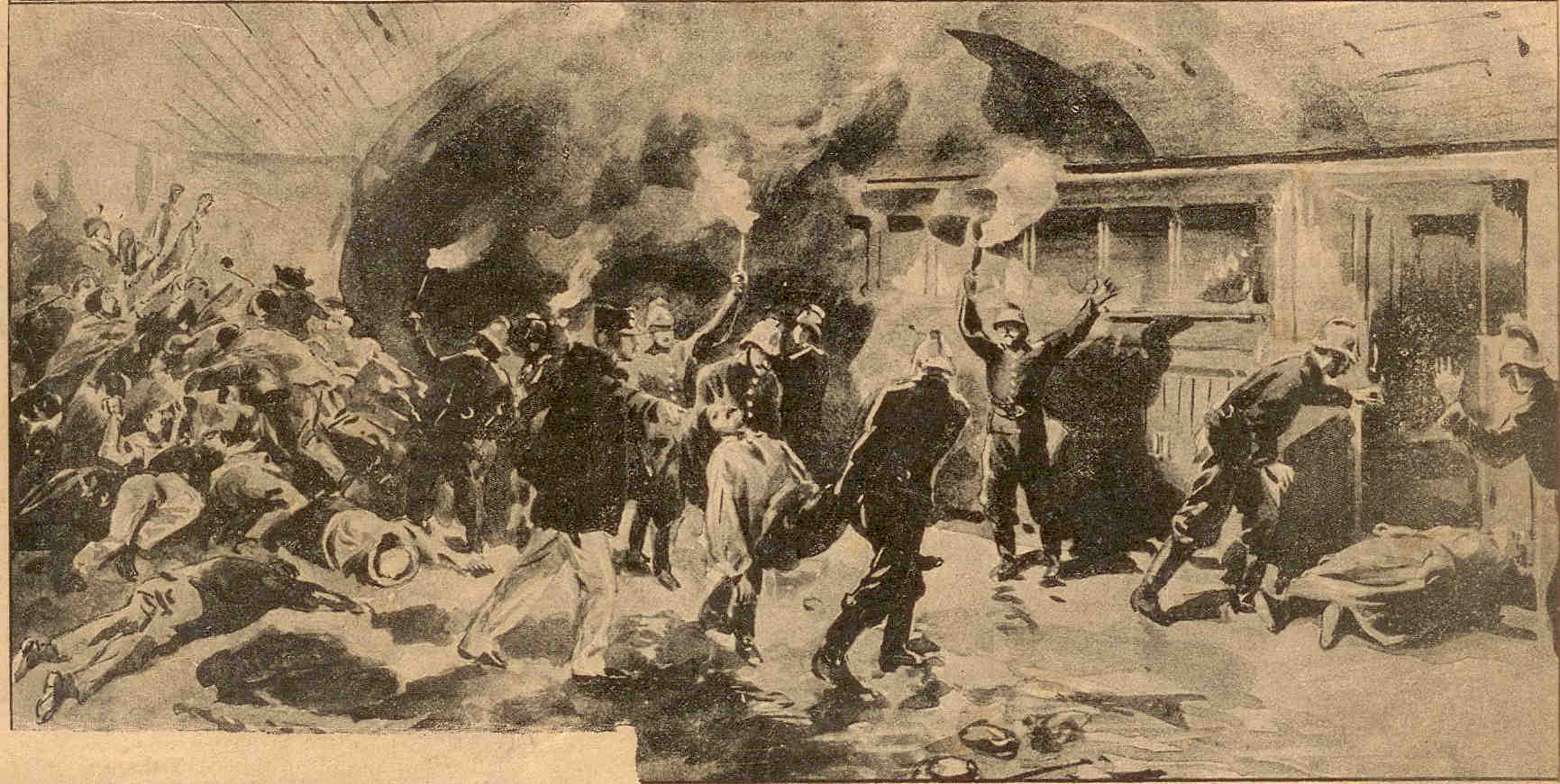
L'Actualité number 187, 16 August 1903

The disastrous Paris Metro train fire occurred on the evening of 10 August 1903, on what was then Line 2 Nord of the system and is now Paris Metro Line 2. There were 84 deaths, most at Couronnes station, so it is also known as the Couronnes Disaster.

== Fire ==
The line, which was less than a year old, was mostly underground, but included an elevated section four stations long from Boulevard Barbès to Rue d'Allemagne (today Barbès – Rochechouart and Jaurès respectively). It was worked by a mixture of 4-car (single) and 8-car (double) trains, of the M1 stock, which turned on loop tracks at each end of the line so that the same car remained in front. On a single train, only the front car had motors; a double train had one motor car at each end, but the power for both cars was routed through the front car, as multiple-unit train control had not yet come into use.

On 10 August 1903, the first sign of trouble happened at 6:53 p.m., when double train 43 completed the climb to the Boulevard Barbès station with heavy smoke pouring from one of the motors on its front car, car M202. The train's passengers were evacuated onto the platform and its shoes were lifted from the third rail to cut off the power, whereupon the burning subsided. But with the station full of annoyed passengers, the staff now focused their attention on restoring service. That meant moving the train, and there was no siding before the line descended back into the tunnel.

The fatal decision was made to lower the shoes and move it under its own power, when in fact the motor had not simply overheated, but had a short circuit. Train 43 left the station at 7:05 p.m. amid a cloud of black smoke, but not two stations later, the fire on car M202 had reignited with greater intensity. Unaware of the severity of the situation, the driver kept the train moving until it was back in the tunnel, and only then stopped for help at the next station (Combat, now Colonel Fabien). Again, the shoes were lifted and the burning stopped — and again power was reapplied, and the fire restarted. This time the wooden paddles used to lift the shoes were consumed.

The driver was still focused on moving the train off the line, but clearly it could not be driven from the front, and there was no way to electrically disconnect the motor cars and drive it from the rear. So he now asked for a push. By this time the passengers waiting at Barbès had boarded the next train (single train 52), which had then advanced as far as Rue d'Allemagne and was waiting for the signal to continue. It was now unloaded in turn onto the platform there and driven to Combat, where it coupled onto the rear of train 43. At 7:32 p.m. the triple train began moving slowly forward, powered by a single motor car and with the short circuit on the front car M202 still live and feeding the fire.

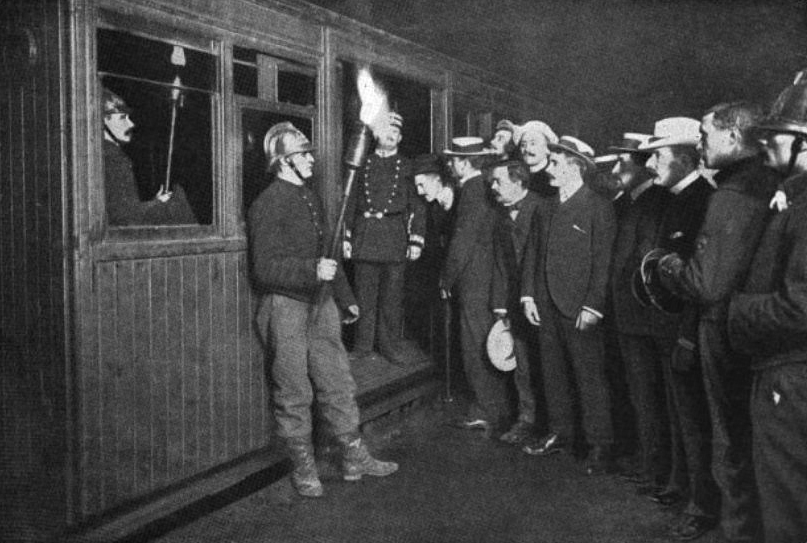
Firemen inspecting a train at the Couronnes station

Meanwhile, the following train (train 48, another single train), advanced to Rue d'Allemagne and the passengers from trains 43 and 52 crowded onto its four cars. The combined train 43-52 next passed the Belleville station. At this station there was a siding, but the failed train could not be put into it; it would have to continue to the end of the line at Nation, 8 stations later. As the train limped past the next station, Couronnes, its stationmaster was justifiably alarmed at the obvious signs of fire. By the time train 48 arrived there with its triple load of passengers, eddying smoke was visible in the tunnel ahead. Rather than pulling forward to the station exit as usual, the driver stopped his short train halfway along the platform to confer with the stationmaster.

With the danger finally understood, the decision was made to evacuate to the street — but by now the passengers, some of them having already been ejected from two trains, were becoming uncooperative. A fare refund was demanded, a lively altercation ensued, but by then it was too late. Train 43-52 had barely reached the next station, Ménilmontant, when the fire grew out of control and the crew fled for their lives. Power was cut at the nearest substation, but since the line was not divided into electrically isolated sections, the shorted motor was still receiving power from other substations.

At about 8 p.m. the fire destroyed the one circuit supplying the station lighting. Couronnes station was plunged into darkness just as a dense, choking cloud of smoke emerged from the tunnel leading to Ménilmontant. In less than a minute, the station had become a death trap. Disoriented by the smoke and far from the exit, many people wandered the wrong way until they succumbed to asphyxia.

In all, 84 people were killed: 75 at Couronnes, seven at Ménilmontant, and two who tried to escape through the tunnel. The wooden-bodied train was completely destroyed.

== Hazards corrected ==
Just eight days after the disaster, the Métro system was ordered to undertake a series of corrective measures:

- Immediately
  - Responsible managers must be assigned to each section of each line, ready to take charge in case of any incident
  - Drivers must be told to isolate short-circuited motors from the power supply
  - Exits must have lighted signs
  - Temporary firefighting stations must be provided until hydrants are installed
  - Stations must have unobstructed exit routes
- Within 15 days
  - Electrical components must be fully insulated
  - Flammable materials must be eliminated, particularly from drivers' cabs
  - Fire hydrants must be installed
  - A second, protected lighting power supply must be installed (this was placed under the track)
- By 1 November 1903
  - Each line must be divided into electrically isolated sections
  - Station exits must be widened

The double trains were quickly reduced from eight cars to seven, with the two motor cars now placed together at the front. But within a few years, in perhaps the disaster's most enduring legacy, multiple-unit trains were adopted. By using much lower currents in their control circuits, these greatly decreased the risk of fire in the case of a traction power failure.

== See also ==
- Lists of rail accidents
