= Ménilmontant (disambiguation) =

Ménilmontant is a neighborhood of Paris, France.

Ménilmontant may also refer to

- Ménilmontant station, a Paris Metro station
- Ménilmontant (1926 film), a silent film by Dimitri Kirsanoff
- Ménilmontant (1936 film), a French film
- "Ménilmontant", a 1938 song by Charles Trenet, covered by Patrick Bruel
