= July 1903 =

Month in 1903

<<	July 1903					>>
Su	Mo	Tu	We	Th	Fr	Sa
			1	2	3	4
5	6	7	8	9	10	11
12	13	14	15	16	17	18
19	20	21	22	23	24	25
26	27	28	29	30	31

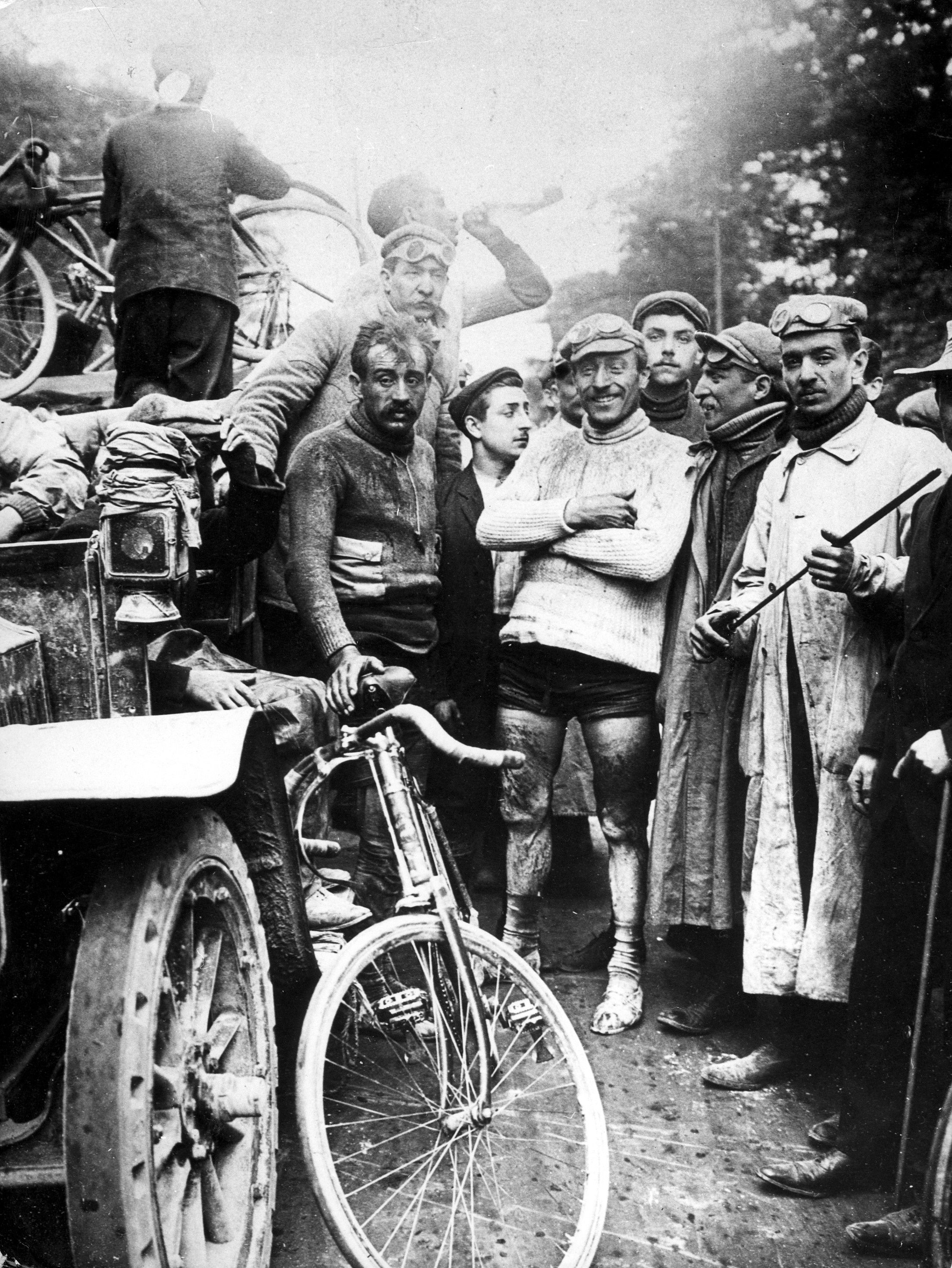
July 1903: Finish of the first Tour de France

The following events occurred in July 1903:

== July 1, 1903 (Wednesday) ==
- The first Tour de France bicycle race, sponsored by the French newspaper L'Auto in an effort to boost sales, was launched from the Café au Réveil-Matin in Paris.
- The metre gauge section of the Rhaetian Railway (RhB) in Switzerland opened, passing through the 1,370-metre-high (4,490 ft) Albula Tunnel in the Alps.
- The 1903 Wimbledon Championships drew to a close, with Laurence Doherty emerging as Men's Singles champion and Dorothea Douglass as Ladies' Singles champion.
- Raymond, Alberta, was incorporated as a town in Canada's North-West Territories.
- Born: Amy Johnson, English aviator, in Hull (died 1941)

== July 2, 1903 (Thursday) ==
- The 1903 Gordon Bennett Cup motor race was held at the Athy Circuit in Ireland and was won by Camille Jenatzy of Belgium.
- Under the Cuban–American Treaty of Relations, signed in May 1903, the United States and Cuba signed a second lease on Guantánamo Bay, as a result of which the U.S. would send a payment to the Cuban government each year in return for permission to use the land as a coaling and naval station.
- Born: Alec Douglas-Home, British politician, Prime Minister of the United Kingdom 1963–64, in London (died 1995); King Olav V of Norway, at Sandringham, UK (died 1991)
- Died: Ed Delahanty, American Major League Baseball left fielder and infielder, fall into Niagara River (born 1867)

== July 3, 1903 (Friday) ==
- Born:
  - Ace Bailey, Canadian ice hockey player, in Bracebridge, Ontario (died 1992)
  - Ralph Samuelson, American inventor of water skiing (died 1977, cancer)
- Died: Harriet Lane, 73, First Lady of the United States during the presidency of her uncle, James Buchanan

== July 4, 1903 (Saturday) ==
- Inaugural World Light Heavyweight Boxing Champion Jack Root lost his title, by a technical knockout, to George Gardiner at Fort Erie, Ontario, Canada, less than three months after winning it.

== July 6, 1903 (Monday) ==
- Born: Hugo Theorell, Swedish scientist and Nobel laureate, in Linköping (died 1982)

== July 9, 1903 (Thursday) ==
- French writer Jacques d'Adelswärd-Fersen was arrested on suspicion of indecent behavior with minors and offending the public decency; he was incarcerated at La Santé Prison.
- Pennsylvania State Constable Harry Foster "Darby" Bierer of Westmoreland County, Pennsylvania was shot and killed by Charles E. Kruger, whom he was trying to arrest for dynamiting a mine building in Luxor, Pennsylvania. After Kruger was arrested, he confessed to 18 murders, including the August 12, 1902, killings of Patrolmen Timothy T. Devine and Charles Pennell of the Chicago Police Department. Kruger would be hanged on February 11, 1904.

== July 11, 1903 (Saturday) ==
- Born: O. E. Hasse, German film actor and director, in Obersitzko (died 1978)

== July 13, 1903 (Monday) ==
- Born: Kenneth Clark, English art historian and broadcaster, in London (died 1983)

== July 15, 1903 (Wednesday) ==
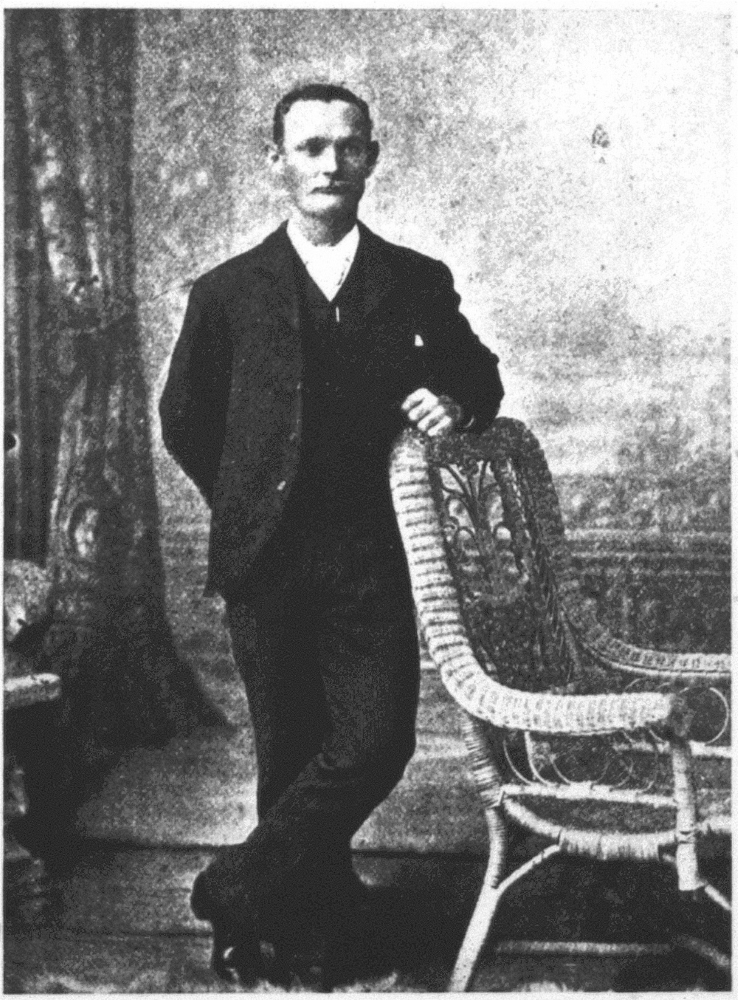
Night watchman Thomas Whelan

- At 7 p.m., a massive explosion destroyed a privately owned explosives magazine at Robb's Jetty, in what is now North Coogee, City of Cockburn, Western Australia, and killed night watchman Thomas Whelan. Although Whelan himself would initially be suspected of sabotage, head caretaker Robert Carrick would become the prime suspect, but would never be charged due to a lack of evidence.

== July 16, 1903 (Thursday) ==
- Born: Adalberto Libera, Italian Modernist architect, in Trentino (died 1963)

== July 17, 1903 (Friday) ==
- Died: James McNeill Whistler, 69, American painter

== July 18, 1903 (Saturday) ==
- The U.S. paddle steamer North Pacific lost its course in foggy conditions, struck a rock off Marrowstone Island, Washington state, and sank.

== July 19, 1903 (Sunday) ==
- The pre-race favourite, France's Maurice Garin, won the inaugural Tour de France.
- King Edward VII of the United Kingdom made his first visit to Ireland since becoming king in 1901.
- At the county jail in Basin, Wyoming, a lynch mob of about 50 men shot and killed Deputy Sheriff C. E. Pierce of the Big Horn County, Wyoming Sheriff's Office, who was guarding two murder suspects, Gorman and Walters. The mob then broke down the jail's doors with telephone poles and shot and killed the two prisoners.

== July 20, 1903 (Monday) ==
- Died: Pope Leo XIII, 93, Italian prelate (born Vincenzo Gioacchino Raffaele Luigi Pecci)

== July 21, 1903 (Tuesday) ==
- The first tropical cyclone of the Atlantic hurricane season developed northeast of the Samaná Peninsula of the Dominican Republic.

== July 23, 1903 (Thursday) ==
- The first Ford Model A automobile was sold to Chicago dentist Ernest Pfennig.

== July 24, 1903 (Friday) ==
- In the by-election at Barnard Castle in the UK, brought about by the death of sitting Liberal MP, Sir Joseph Pease, Arthur Henderson took the seat for Labour, becoming the first Labour candidate to win against both Liberal and Conservative opposition, and only the fifth Labour MP in the House of Commons.

== July 25, 1903 (Saturday) ==
- The weekly magazine Truth was launched in Perth, Western Australia, under the editorship of John Norton.

== July 26, 1903 (Sunday) ==
- Argentina's soccer champions, Alumni Athletic Club, lost their first match in four years, and the only one of the season, to Belgrano AC.
- Horatio Nelson Jackson, Sewall K. Crocker and a bulldog named Bud finished the first cross country roadtrip, using a car, from San Francisco to New York City.

== July 27, 1903 (Monday) ==
- Construction work began on the Baghdad Railway in present-day Turkey.
- Glasgow St Enoch rail accident: A Glasgow and South Western Railway train collided with buffer stops at St Enoch railway station, resulting in 17 deaths.
- Officer William Leopold Cotter of the California Department of Corrections and Rehabilitation was stabbed to death during the escape of 13 prisoners from the Folsom Penitentiary. Several other prison staff members were seriously wounded, and two members of the state militia would be shot and killed during the manhunt for the prisoners.
- Born: Michail Stasinopoulos, Greek politician, President 1974–75, in Kalamata (died 2002)

== July 28, 1903 (Tuesday) ==
- Idaho Springs miners' strike of 1903: Philip Fire, a striking union miner, died in an attempt to dynamite the transformer house at the "Sun and Moon" mine.

== July 29, 1903 (Wednesday) ==
- An explosion at a United States Cartridge Company magazine in Tewksbury, Massachusetts, United States, killed 22 employees and local residents; a further 70 people were injured.

== July 30, 1903 (Thursday) ==
- The 2nd Congress of the Russian Social Democratic Labour Party opened in Brussels, chaired by Lenin.

== July 31, 1903 (Friday) ==
- Papal conclave, 1903: The Papal conclave brought about by the death of Pope Leo XIII began at the Sistine Chapel, Apostolic Palace, in Rome, Italy.
