= June 1903 =

Month in 1903

<<	June 1903					>>
Su	Mo	Tu	We	Th	Fr	Sa
	1	2	3	4	5	6
7	8	9	10	11	12	13
14	15	16	17	18	19	20
21	22	23	24	25	26	27
28	29	30

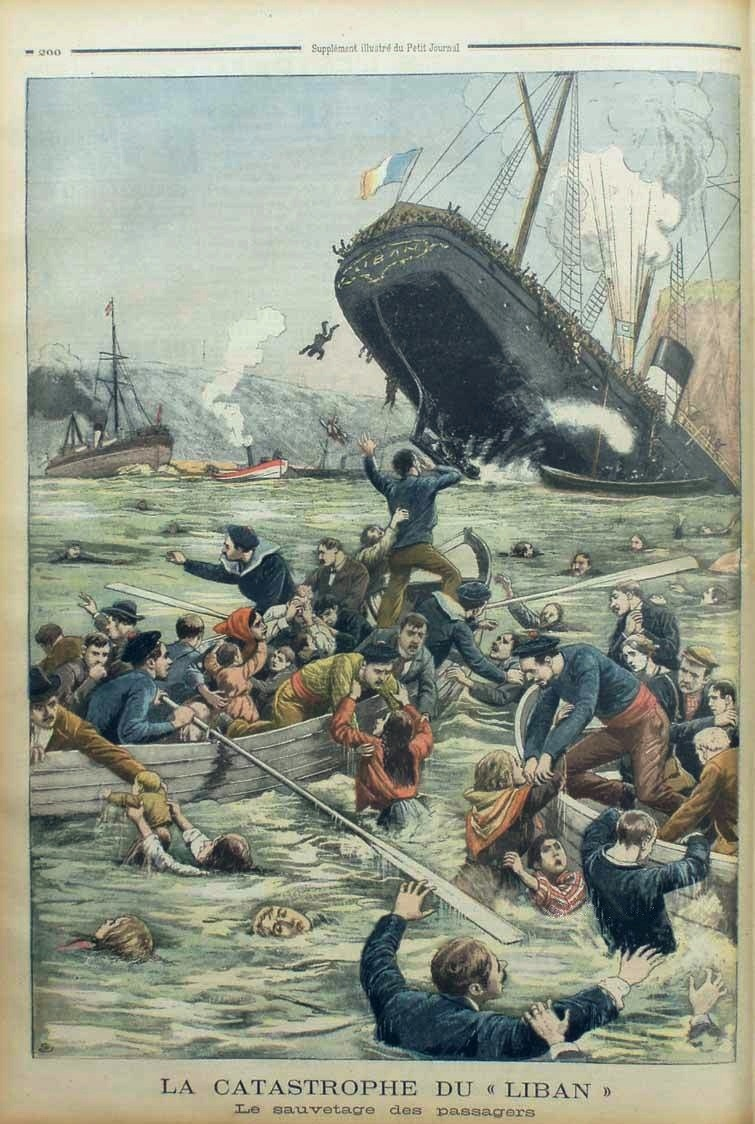
June 7, 1903: French liner Liban sinks after collision, killing 97 people.

The following events occurred in June 1903:

== June 1, 1903 (Monday) ==
- The International Congress of Miners, representing 1,271,500 miners, opened in Brussels in Belgium. The Congress adopted a resolution the next day for a guaranteed minimum wage, and pledging that members would participate in politics.
- In Philadelphia, the 90,000 unionized textile workers went on strike for shorter hours and higher wages.
- In Canada, the Premier of British Columbia was dismissed by the province's Lieutenant Governor.
- The Congress of Chile opened its new session.
- Born: Vasyl Velychkovsky, Ukrainian bishop and martyr, in Stanislav (died 1973)

== June 2, 1903 (Tuesday) ==
- An earthquake of 6.9 magnitude struck the Alaska Peninsula, part of the territory of the United States.
- A tornado killed 64 people in the U.S. state of Georgia, and injured more than 200.

== June 3, 1903 (Wednesday) ==
- English artist Laura Johnson married painter Harold Knight.

== June 4, 1903 (Thursday) ==
- In the U.S. state of Kansas, a collision between two trains on the Sante Fe line killed nine people and injured 28 others at Paola, Kansas, one mile north of Stillwell.

== June 5, 1903 (Friday) ==
- Six days before the assassination of King Alexander of Serbia and his wife, a new constitution was promulgated in Serbia to further restrict the powers of the monarch and to increase the accountability of government officials.

== June 6, 1903 (Saturday) ==
- Sir Edward Elgar conducted his oratorio, The Dream of Gerontius, at Westminster Cathedral, the first time it had been performed in London.
- U.S. President Theodore Roosevelt reutrned to Washington after his tour of the western United States, having traveled 14,000 miles and having made 263 speeches.
- Born: Aram Khachaturian, Armenian composer, in Tiflis, Russian Empire (died 1978)

== June 7, 1903 (Sunday) ==
- The sinking of the French steamer Liban killed 97 of more than 200 passengers and crew, with most of the fatalities being women and children.

== June 8, 1903 (Monday) ==
- The Legislative Assembly in the South African colony of Transavaal voted to exclude limit voting to white residents.
- A force of 3,500 men of the French Foreign Legion crossed from French Algeria into the Sultanate of Morocco to attack villages in the Figuig district.
- Born: Marguerite Yourcenar, Belgian-French author, in Brussels (died 1987)

== June 9, 1903 (Tuesday) ==
- Trinity College, Dublin, announced its intention to accept women as full members in the following year. "Steamboat ladies" from Oxford and Cambridge would be among the first recipients.
- Died: Gaspar Núñez de Arce, 68, Spanish poet

== June 10, 1903 (Wednesday) ==
- The Belgian steam Rubens capsized and sunk in the North Sea, killing 11 of its 15 crew.
- Born: Theo Lingen, German actor (d. 1978)

== June 11, 1903 (Thursday) ==
  - King Alexander I of Serbia and his wife Queen Draga were assassinated in a coup d'état in Belgrade by conspirators from the Black Hand (Crna Ruka) society. The assassins also shot and killed the Serbian prime minister and several members of his cabinet, and two of the Queen's brothers.
- Harry Vardon of Jersey won the 1903 Open Championship golf tournament at Prestwick in Scotland.
  - Nikolai Bugaev, 65, Russian mathematician

== June 12, 1903 (Friday) ==
- An edict by the Russian Empire was passed to place all property of the Armenian Church under Tsarist Imperial control, prompting the founding of the Armenian Revolutionary Federation, a militia to act as guards of the churches and protesters for religious freedom.
- The Kitemark service quality mark of product approval was started by the British Standards Institution, now the BSI Group.
- Sigma Alpha Iota, an honorary fraternity for musicians, was founded at the School of Music at the University of Michigan.

== June 13, 1903 (Saturday) ==
- Italy's Prime Minister, Giuseppe Zanardelli, resigned after losing a vote in the Italian Chamber of Deputies. He would reconsider the next day, and would remain in the post until November.

== June 14, 1903 (Sunday) ==
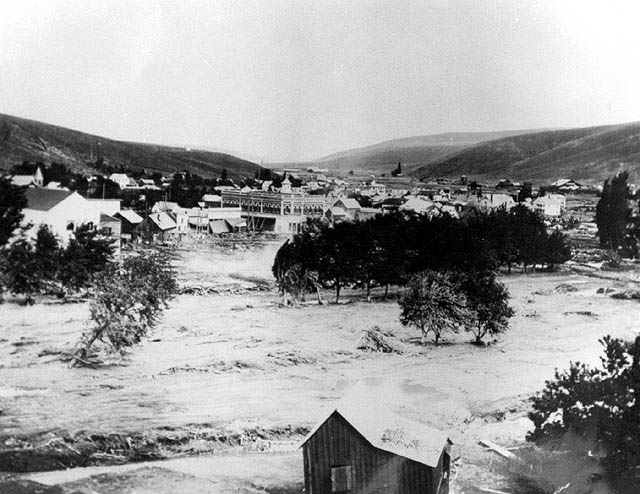
June 14, 1903: Downtown Heppner, Oregon, during the flood

- Heppner flood of 1903: The town of Heppner, Oregon, was nearly destroyed by a cloud burst that resulted in a flash flood that killed an estimated 247 people.

== June 15, 1903 (Monday) ==
- Prince Peter Karageorgevitch was unanimously selected as the new King of Serbia by the kingdom's Senate, four days after King Alexander's assassination.

== June 16, 1903 (Tuesday) ==
- In Germany's federal election, the Social Democratic Party (SPD) won the popular vote, but the Centre Party remained the largest party in the Reichstag.
- In the Danish Folketing election, the Venstre Reform Party, under incumbent Council President Johan Henrik Deuntzer, won 73 of the 114 seats.
- Norwegian explorer Roald Amundsen set off from Oslo in an attempt at the first east–west navigation of the Northwest Passage.
- The Ford Motor Company was incorporated in Detroit by Henry Ford.
- Prime Minister Kálmán Széll of Hungary resigned along with his cabinet after tendering his resignation to the Emperor of Austria-Hungary.

== June 17, 1903 (Wednesday) ==
- The British ironclad turret ship HMS Scorpion foundered in the Atlantic Ocean while being towed from the United Kingdom to the United States to be scrapped, and was lost. The Royal Navy ship had already been decommissioned, sunk as a target, and raised for its scrap value.

== June 18, 1903 (Thursday) ==
- In England, an explosion of lyddite at an arsenal in Woolwich killed 16 men and seriously injured 17 others.
- Born:
  - Jeanette MacDonald, American singer and actress, in Philadelphia (died 1965)
  - Raymond Radiguet, French author, in Saint-Maur (died 1923)

== June 19, 1903 (Friday) ==
- The United States military officially adopted the M1903 Springfield rifle.
- A minor earthquake (4.9 magnitude) struck an area of North Wales, UK, centred on the town of Caernarfon.
- Born:
  - Lou Gehrig, American baseball player, in New York City (died 1941)
  - Wally Hammond, English cricketer, in Dover (died 1965)
- Died: Herbert Vaughan, 71, English Catholic cardinal and Archbishop of Westminster

== June 20, 1903 (Saturday) ==
- The U.S. magazine The Saturday Evening Post began its serialization of Jack London's third novel, The Call of the Wild.

== June 21, 1903 (Sunday) ==
- Born:
  - Al Hirschfeld, American caricaturist, in St Louis (died 2003)
  - Alf Sjöberg, Swedish theatre and film director, in Stockholm (died 1980)

== June 22, 1903 (Monday) ==
- Born:
  - John Dillinger, American gangster, in Indianapolis (died 1934)
  - Jiro Horikoshi, Japanese aircraft designer, in Fujioka (died 1982)
  - Ben Pollack, American jazz drummer and bandleader, in Chicago (died 1971)

== June 23, 1903 (Tuesday) ==
- George White, an African-American suspected of murdering Helen Bishop, a minister's daughter, was lynched in New Castle County, Delaware.
- Born: Anthony Veiller, American screenwriter and film producer, son of screenwriter Bayard Veiller and actress Margaret Wycherly, in New York City (died 1965)

== June 24, 1903 (Wednesday) ==
- Wilbur Wright made a presentation to the Western Scoeity of Engineers in Chicago to give details of the progress that he and his brother Orville Wright had made in 1902 with their glider experiments, but avoided any mention of their plans to make the first engine-powered flight, which would take place almost six months later on December 17, 1903, at Kitty Hawk, North Carolina.
- The Ignace Bourget Monument, sculpted by Louis-Philippe Hébert in honor of the Roman Catholic Bishop of Montreal, Ignace Bourget (1799–1885).

== June 25, 1903 (Thursday) ==
- Born:
  - Pierre Brossolette, French journalist and resistance fighter, in Paris (died 1944)
  - George Orwell, English author, in Motihari, Bengal Presidency, British India, under the name Eric Arthur Blair (died 1950)

== June 26, 1903 (Friday) ==
- Croydon Mental Hospital, the first institution to be referred to as a "mental hospital" or a "mental institution" (as opposed to a "lunatic asylum") was opened at Warlingham, Surrey, south of London a research hospital for psychiatric treatment. Considered an improvement, the hospital's treatment research included now-discredited procedures including psychosurgery (including the lobotomy) and electruc shock therapy.
- The Culebra Naval Reservation was established by U.S. President Theodore Roosevelt at Culebra Island in the newly acquired U.S. territory of Puerto Rico for military exercises and training, and would operate until 1975.
- The White Star Line ocean liner SS Arabic, with accommodation for 1,400 passengers, began its maiden voyage from Liverpool in the United Kingdom, arriving in New York City in the U.S. on July 5. The Arabic would be sunk by a German submarine during World War One, on August 19, 1915.
- Born:
  - Vice-Admiral Harry DeWolf, Royal Canadian Navy officer who commanded HMCS Haida during World War II; in Bedford, Nova Scotia (d.2000)
  - Vice-Admiral John Lancaster, British Royal Navy officer (d. 1992)

== June 27, 1903 (Saturday) ==
- Almost 200 train passengers were killed in an accident in Spain.
- Count Károly Khuen-Héderváry formed a new cabinet as Prime Minister of Hungary.
- American socialite Aida de Acosta, age 19, became the first woman to fly a powered aircraft solo when she piloted Santos-Dumont's motorized dirigible, "No. 9", from Paris to Château de Bagatelle in France.
- Elisabeth Moore won the Women's Singles competition at the 1903 U.S. National Championships tennis tournament.

== June 28, 1903 (Sunday) ==
- The Goethe Monument, with a statue created by Carl Seffner, was dedicated in the German city of Leipzig.
- The first international New Thought convention was held at the grand hall on the top of the Masonic Temple Building in Chicago and attended by 1,200 adherents of the movement from 20 organizations.
- Born:
  - Adrian Rollini, American jazz saxophonist known for his choices for unusual wind instruments, including the couesnophone and the hot fountain pen clarinet; in New York City (d. 1956)
- Died: Thomas Chalmers, 87, American industrialist and co-founder of the Allis-Chalmers industrial equipment company

== June 29, 1903 (Monday) ==
- A meteorite fall, classification H5, was observed in Uberaba, Minas Gerais, Brazil.
- Willie Anderson of Scotland won the U.S. Open golf tournament.
- Born: Alan Blumlein, British electronics engineer, in London (died 1942)

== June 30, 1903 (Tuesday) ==
- A meteorite fall, classification L6, was observed in Rich Mountain (Watauga County, North Carolina), United States.
