= Rue de Ménilmontant =

Street in Paris

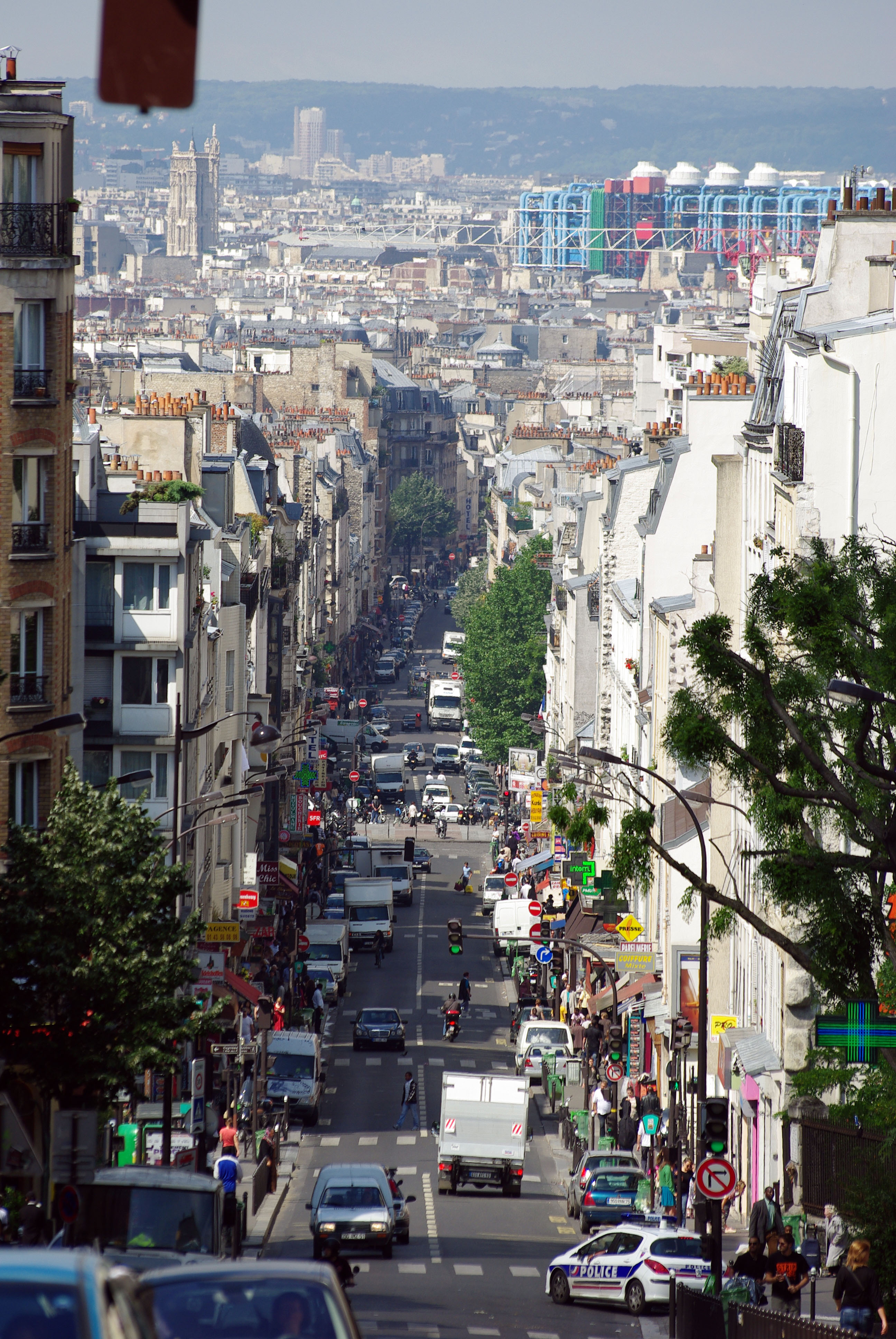
- Rue de Ménilmontant

- Location within Paris
- Former names: Chemin du Ménil-Mautemps; Chaussée ou avenue de Ménilmontant
- Length: 1,230 m (4,040 ft)
- Width: 13.7 m (45 ft)
- Arrondissement: 20th
- Quarter: Belleville; Saint-Fargeau; Père-Lachaise
- Coordinates: 48°52′4.79″N 2°23′12.91″E
- From: 2, boulevard de Belleville; 152, boulevard de Ménilmontant
- To: 105, rue Pelleport

The Rue de Ménilmontant is a street which runs through the 20th arrondissement of Paris, France.

== History ==
The street, formerly a chemin (path), took its name from the hamlet of Mesnil-Maudan, that it led to, in the 13th century. In 1732, the street was altered to be less steep; in 1733, it was made wider; and in 1734, by order of King Louis XV, trees were planted on both sides. From 1777 to 1806, it was separated in three parts. The first part between the Rue de la Folie-Méricourt and the Rue Popincourt was called the Rue du Chemin de Ménilmontant, the second part ending the Rue Saint-Maur was called the Rue de la Roulette, the third and last part was called Haute-Borne. Since 1806, the whole length has been entirely known as the Rue de Ménilmontant. In 1860, Baron Haussmann integrated the village of Ménilmontant into Paris, making the Rue de Ménilmontant a street of Paris.

== Name origin ==
The word mesnil (from the latin masnilium) meant "country house" and was also sometimes used to designate a hamlet. The name later became Mesnil-Mautemps then Mal-Temps and finally Mesnil-Montant, probably due to the steepness of the street (montant meaning "climbing").

== Closest transport ==
Metro: Ménilmontant; Saint-Fargeau

Bus: 26, 60, 61, 96
