= 1903 America's Cup =

12th America's Cup
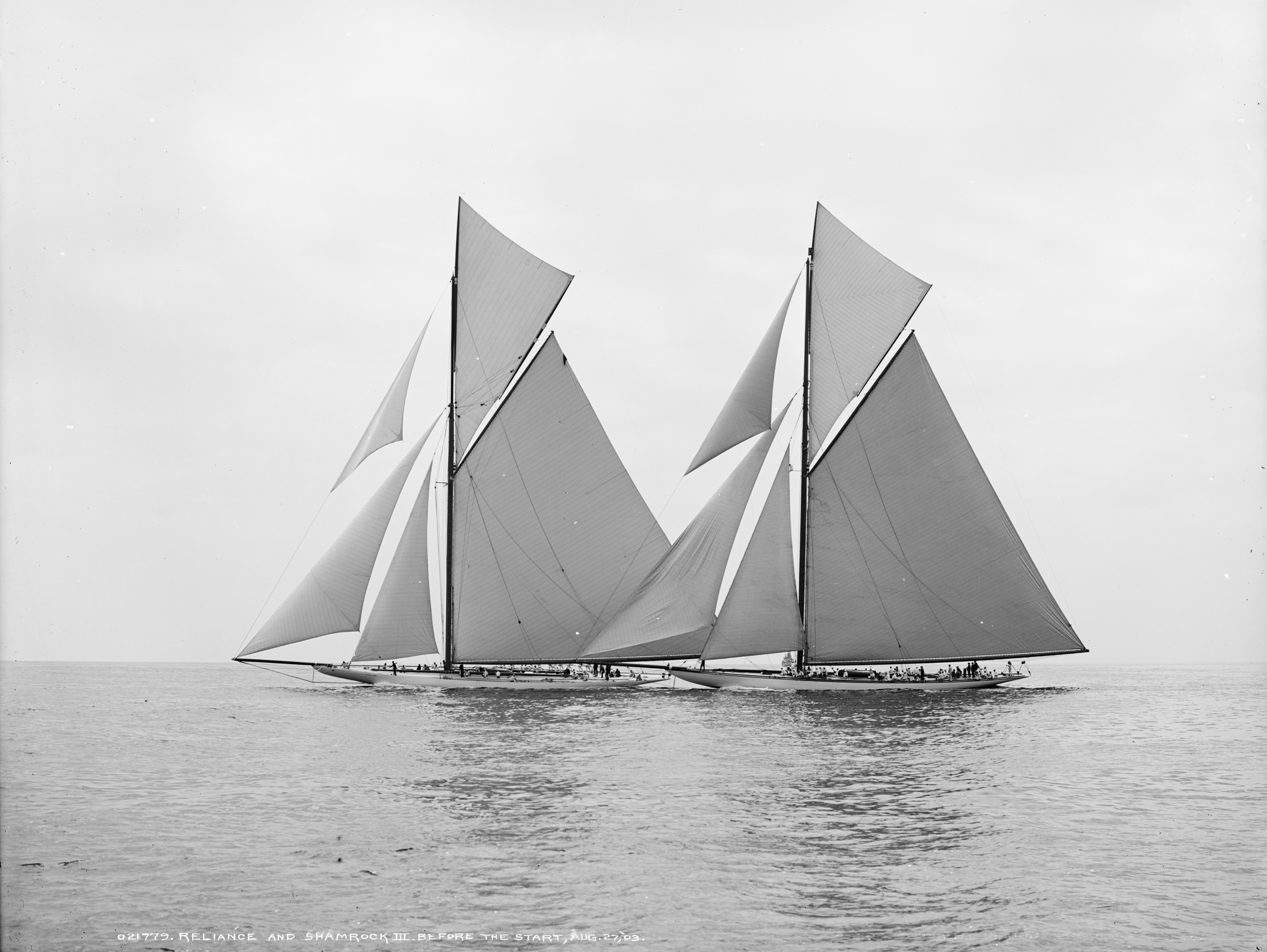
- Reliance (left) and Shamrock III (right) before the race

Defender United States
- Defender club: New York Yacht Club
- Yacht: Reliance

Challenger United Kingdom
- Challenger club: Royal Ulster Yacht Club
- Yacht: Shamrock III

Competition
- Location: New York City
- 40°40′N 74°02′W
- Dates: 1903
- Rule: Seawanhaka
- Winner: New York Yacht Club
- Score: 3–0

The 1903 America's Cup was the 12th challenge for the Cup. It took place in the New York City harbor and consisted of a best of five series of races between Reliance, the fourth of Nathaniel Herreshoff's defenders for the cup, entered by the New York Yacht Club; and Shamrock III, representing the Royal Ulster Yacht Club and also the third of Sir Thomas Lipton's Cup challengers. Reliance won the first three races, defending the cup. It was the last race for the America's Cup that would take place under the Seawanhaka rule.

== Reliance ==
Reliance was designed by Nathaniel Herreshoff, designer of all of the early 20th century America's Cup defenders. She was designed to take full advantage of the fact that the Seawanhaka rule did not take weight into account, leading to a very light and therefore, somewhat unstable yacht. At 144 feet (44 m) long and 199 feet (61 m) tall with 16,160 square feet (1,501 m^{2}) of sail the yacht was the largest gaff-rigged cutter ever built.

== Race ==
Reliance won all three races, finishing far enough ahead that Shamrock III was forced to retire before finishing the third race.

The course for the race was laid out by Lewis Blix.
