= Idaho Springs miners' strike of 1903 =

The Idaho Springs miners strike of 1903 was a labor strike by members of the Western Federation of Miners (WFM) against gold mines in the vicinity of Idaho Springs, Colorado. It is one of the strikes of 1903-1904 that are collectively known as the Colorado Labor Wars. The union demanded a reduction in the working day to eight hours, without a corresponding reduction in pay. The strike began on 1 May 1903, and was called off on 1 September 1903. The strike is noted for a dynamite attack on the Sun and Moon mine, and the forcible deportation of 19 union officials and union members from the area.

== Background ==
The Western Federation of Miners (WFM) had mixed success in Colorado. After a highly successful strike in the Cripple Creek mining district in 1894, the WFM had suffered a stinging defeat in the Leadville Miners' strike of 1896-1897. The loss at Leadville radicalized the WFM leadership into espousing revolutionary socialism. The union's open use of firearms at Telluride in 1901 helped them win that strike, and eject the nonunion miners from Telluride. But a year after the strike, in 1902, someone killed mine manager Arthur Collins with a shotgun blast through a window in his Telluride home. No one was ever arrested for the crime, but mine owners and mine managers blamed the WFM. Some mine officials saw the murder of Arthur Collins as an example of what could happen to themselves if the WFM were not stopped. The socialist rhetoric of the WFM leadership cost the union allies among businessmen and the middle class. And knowing that the WFM strove toward a world without mine owners, the mine owners were even less inclined than before to deal constructively with the union.

Miners in Colorado particularly resented the lack of an 8-hour work day. The legislature had passed a bill for a mandatory 8-hour workday, only to have the courts declare that it violated the US constitution. A second bill was passed, modeled after a Utah 8-hour bill that survived a US Supreme Court challenge, but the Colorado Supreme Court ruled that the second bill violated the state constitution. A ballot measure to establish the 8-hour day by amending the state constitution passed overwhelmingly in November 1902, but the Republican-controlled legislature meeting in 1903 refused to pass enabling legislation. Blocked politically, the WFM made it a priority to win the 8-hour day for its Colorado members through collective bargaining.

In February 1903, the WFM had won the 8-hour day for employees of the ore processing mills at Colorado City, despite the presence of Colorado National Guard troops protecting the ore mills and the nonstriking workmen. The union victory was due in part to a threatened sympathy strike by gold miners in nearby Cripple Creek, to stop shipments of ore to the offending ore processing mills.

== The strike ==
In April 1903, WFM officials approached managers of the gold mines around Idaho Springs, and proposed that the normal workday be reduced to 8 hours, with no reduction in pay. The owners all refused.

On 1 May 1903, the WFM local at Idaho Springs declared a strike against six gold mines, demanding the 8-hour day with no reduction in wages. About 250 miners walked out, idling six mines. Two mines reopened on 18 May with nonunion miners, but paid the nonunion men the union-demanded wage for an 8-hour day. When these mines, along with a third mine, agreed to take back striking union miners and also pay them the old wage for eight-hour days, the union declared the strike off for those mines. But the other three mines also reopened with nonunion men, and did not go to 8-hour shifts.

Mine owners and businessmen banded together in the Citizens Protective League to counter what its members saw as the violent tendencies of a radical union. Such organizations were forming in many towns in Colorado. The city and county hired 14 extra deputies to protect the mines and miners. In response, the WFM local issued a statement that the deputies were a waste of taxpayer money, because the striking miners were law-abiding. The union noted that many of their members were homeowners and long-time residents of the area: "... we are not dynamiters and thugs."^{p. 76}

== Dynamite and deportations ==
Close to midnight on 28 July, the night watchman at the Sun and Moon mine, one of the remaining strike targets, saw two or three men up on the ridge above the mine, and a brief light, as if one of the men had struck a match. He shouted at the men, one of whom shot at him. Almost immediately, an explosion destroyed the transformer house, below where the men were seen. The dynamiters had left behind one of their number, Philip Fire, a striking union miner mortally injured by a blast, who died before dawn. The Sun and Moon employees surmised that the men on the ridge had prepared two kegs of dynamite to roll down the hill, perhaps one at the compressor house, and one at the shaft house, but, startled by the watchman, they had released the kegs prematurely; one had hit and destroyed the transformer house, and the other keg hit some object and exploded close to the saboteurs, fatally wounding one of them. Had one of the kegs exploded at the shafthouse, it might have killed the four miners in the building, as well as 14 more miners working underground.^{p. 77}

On the same night as the explosion, deputy sheriffs began arresting officers and members of the WFM local.

The next evening, the Citizens' Protective League, which had organized at the beginning of the strike, held an emotional meeting at the Idaho Springs Opera House, chaired by the city attorney. A number of speakers blamed the dynamite attack on the national and local WFM leadership. The deputy district attorney, who was not a member, told the meeting that the legal process would handle the case, and warned against any mob actions. One mine manager, Lafayette Hanchette, accused the WFM of plotting to kill himself and other mine managers, the same as mine manager Arthur Collins had been murdered in Telluride the year before. Referring to a recent incident in which union miners in the Cripple Creek district had ordered a group of arriving miners to turn around and leave the area, Hanchette said: "I think that if it is good law for the Western Federation of Murderers at Victor to walk five Austrians out of town, it is good law for us citizens to adopt here tonight." A motion to expel the top WFM members from Idaho Springs passed with a shout.^{p. 152-154}

A group of 500 marched to the Idaho Springs jail, demanded that 14 of the union men behind bars be released to them, and took the 14 to the city limits, and ordered them to keep walking, and never to return to Clear Creek County. Five more union members were deported from town over the next few days. Among those expelled were the president, vice president, secretary, and treasurer of the WFM local.

In a statement the next day, the Citizens' Protective League blamed the dynamite attack on the rhetoric of "agitators of socialist principals" among the union organizers, whether or not they planned or participated in the incident. The text declared: "We have more sympathy for the Italians touching the fuse that destroyed the transformer house and resulting in the death of one of them, than we have for the agitators who inspired them to do it."^{p. 155}

In late August, 1903, the Western Federation of Miners called off the strike effective 1 September. The union asked only that union members not be discriminated against.

== Consequences ==
The deportation of union miners was followed by a legal stalemate. On one side was district judge Frank Owers in the county seat of Georgetown, who insisted that the deportations had been highly illegal, and castigated the district attorney for not prosecuting members of the Citizens' Protective League. Owers issued bench warrants for 129 league members for participating in the deportation. On the other side was District Attorney H. G. Thurman, who refused to prosecute members of the Citizens' Protective League, but went after union members he suspected of complicity in the explosion at the Sun and Moon mine. The deportees appealed for help to governor Peabody, who answered that they had not exhausted their legal remedies. Eight of the deported union men returned to Idaho Springs, only to be promptly arrested for conspiring in the dynamite attack. Five WFM members were eventually tried, but were acquitted in Clear Creek County. But they then went through another trial on similar charges in Gilpin County, because while the ridgetop was in Clear Creek County, the transformer house was just over the line in Gilpin County. In July 1904, the last of the accused union members was acquitted in Gilpin County.^{p. 157-159}

The Idaho Springs strike was one of the early events in the Colorado labor war. The WFM also called unsuccessful strikes in Denver, Durango, and Telluride. The fiercest struggle of the Colorado labor war was the WFM strike called in August 1903, in its long-time union stronghold of Cripple Creek. The Cripple Creek strike was defeated by the Colorado National Guard and the imposition of martial law. The result was that the Western Federation of Miners was essentially finished as a power in Colorado.

== See also ==
Colorado Labor Wars
