= Ménilmontant station =

Métro station in Paris, France

Ménilmontant
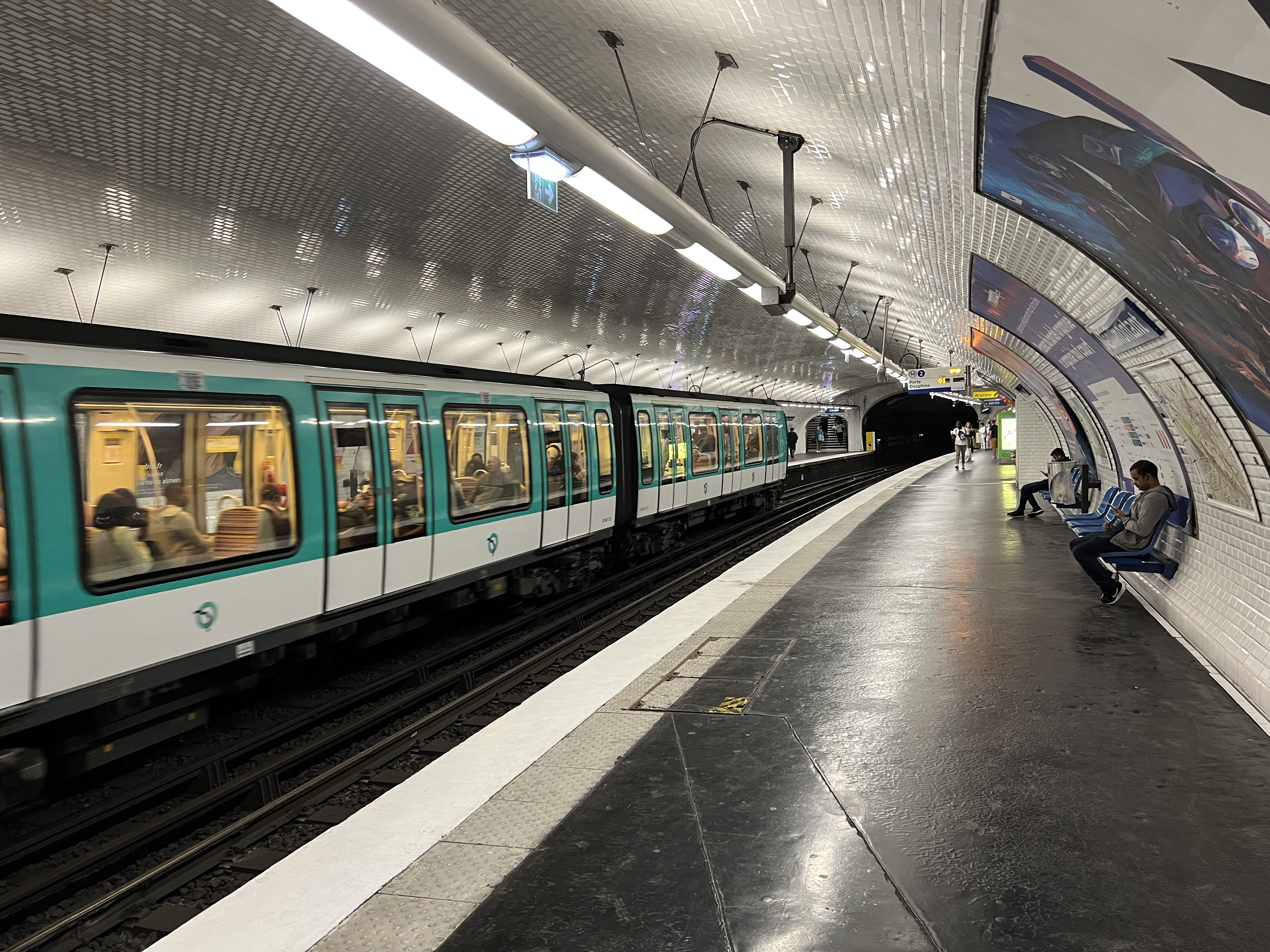

General information
- Location: 139, Boul. de Ménilmontant; 11th arrondissement of Paris; Île-de-France; France
- Coordinates: 48°51′58″N 2°23′01″E
- Owner: RATP
- Operator: RATP

Other information
- Fare zone: 1

History
- Opened: 31 January 1903

Services
Preceding station	Paris Metro	Following station
Couronnes towards Porte Dauphine	Line 2	Père Lachaise towards Nation
Route map
Location
- Location within Paris

Ménilmontant (French pronunciation: [menilmɔ̃tɑ̃]) is a station on Line 2 of the Paris Métro, on the border of the 11th and 20th arrondissements.

== Location ==
The station is established at the start of Boulevard de Ménilmontant at its junction with Boulevard de Belleville, at the intersection with Rue de Ménilmontant and Rue Oberkampf. Oriented approximately along a north-west / south-east axis, it is located between the Couronnes and Père Lachaise stations.

== History ==
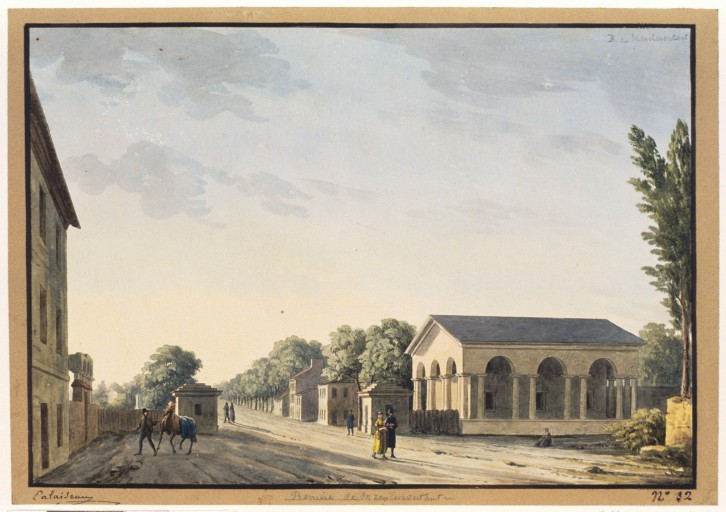
The Barrière de Ménilmontant, a gate of the Wall of the Farmers-General

The station was opened on 31 January 1903 as part of the extension of line 2 (known at the time as "2 Nord") from Anvers to Bagnolet (now called Alexandre Dumas). It is named after the Boulevard de Ménilmontant, which was named after a hamlet, annexed by Belleville before the French Revolution and in turn by Paris in 1860. It was the location of the Barrière de Ménilmontant, a gate built for the collection of taxation as part of the Wall of the Farmers-General; the gate was built between 1784 and 1788 and demolished during the 19th century.

On 10 August 1903, the station was one of the locations of the most serious accident on the Paris metro. A fire in a wooden train, empty of passengers, killed seven people in the station, but the spread of toxic fumes and heat to the neighboring station at Couronnes would claim the lives of 77 others.

As part of the RATP's Metro Renewal program, the entire station was renovated around the year 2000.

On 9 October 2019, half of the nameplates on the station's platforms are temporarily replaced by the RATP in order to celebrate the 60th anniversary of Astérix and Obélix, as in eleven other stations. Taking up in particular the typography characteristic of the comics of René Goscinny and Albert Uderzo, Ménilmontant is humorously renamed Menhirmontant in reference to the animated film Asterix and the Big Fight (Astérix et le coup du menhir) .

In 2019, 3,943,809 travelers entered the station which placed it at the 120th position of the metro stations for its usage.

== Passenger services ==
=== Access ===
The station has a single access entitled Boulevard de Ménilmontant, leading to the central reservation of this boulevard facing no. 137. Consisting of a fixed staircase, it is adorned with a Guimard entrance, which was subject to a registration as historic monument by the decree of 12 February 2016.

=== Station layout ===
Street Level

B1	Mezzanine for platform connection

Platform level	Side platform, doors will open on the right
Platform level	Platform 1	← toward Porte Dauphine (Couronnes)
Platform level	Platform 2	toward Nation (Père Lachaise) →
Platform level	Side platform, doors will open on the right

=== Platforms ===
Ménilmontant is a metro station with a slight curve with a standard configuration. It has two platforms separated by the metro tracks and the vault is elliptical. The decoration is of the style used for most metro stations with bevelled white ceramic tiles covering the walls, the vault, the tunnel exits, and the end of the corridors, while the lighting is provided by two tube strips. The advertising frames are metallic, and the name of the station is written in Parisine font on enamelled plates. The seats are in the blue Motte style. Access is via the northwest end.

=== Bus connection ===
The station is served by lines 20, 71 and 96 of the RATP Bus Network and, at night, by lines N12 and N23 of the Noctilien bus network.

== Gallery ==
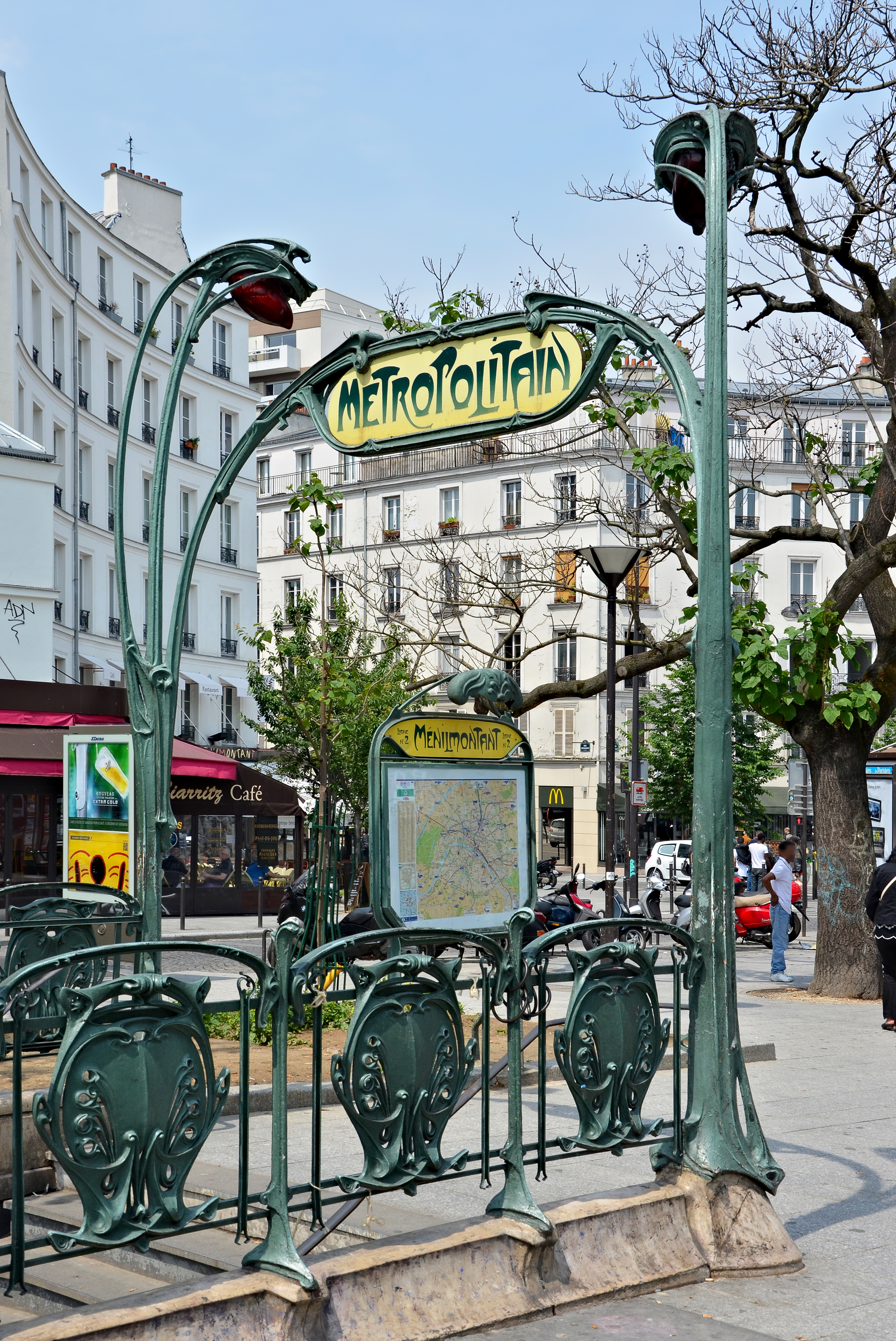
Street-level entrance at Ménilmontant

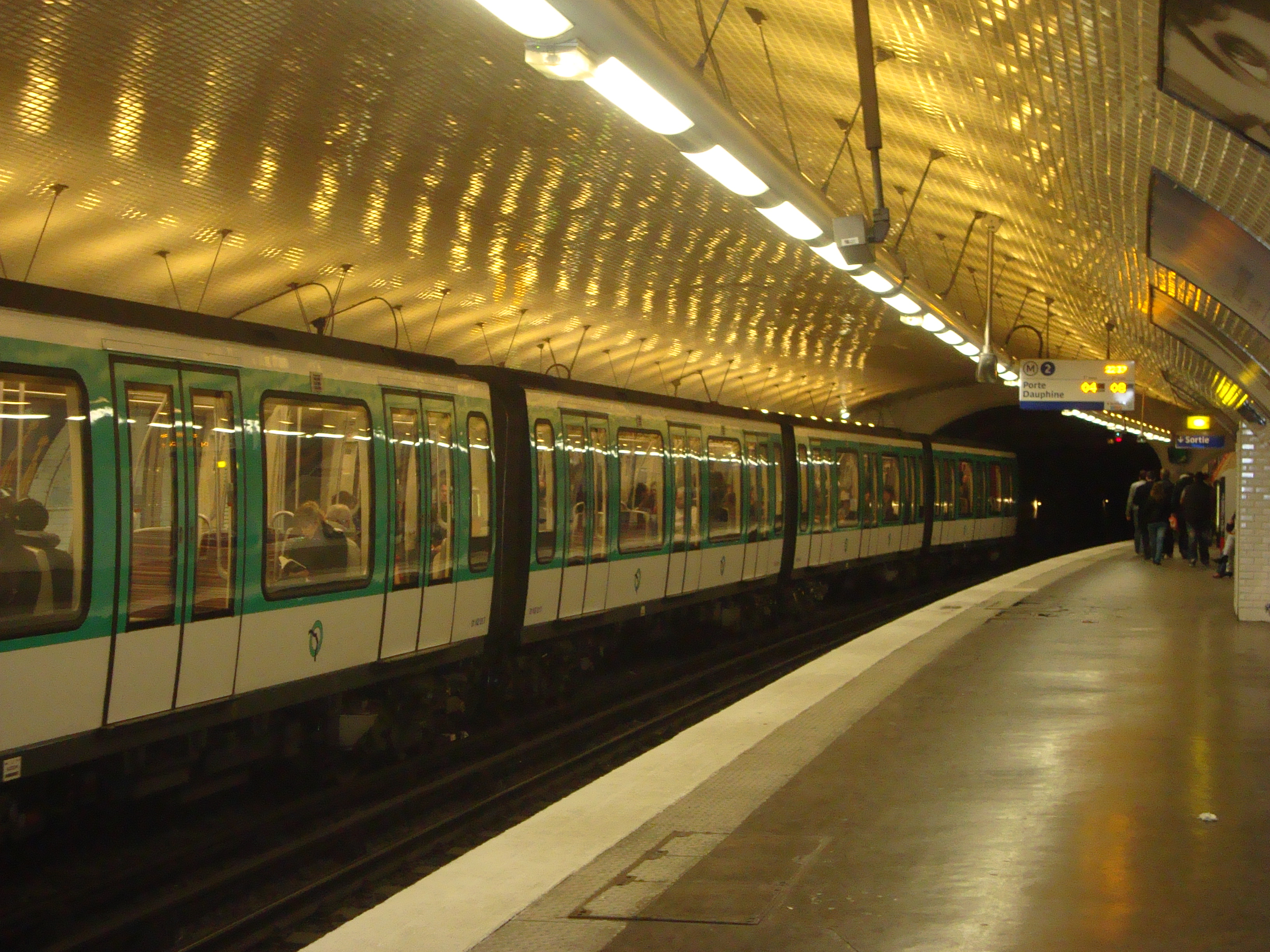
MF 2000 rolling stock on Line 2 at Ménilmontant

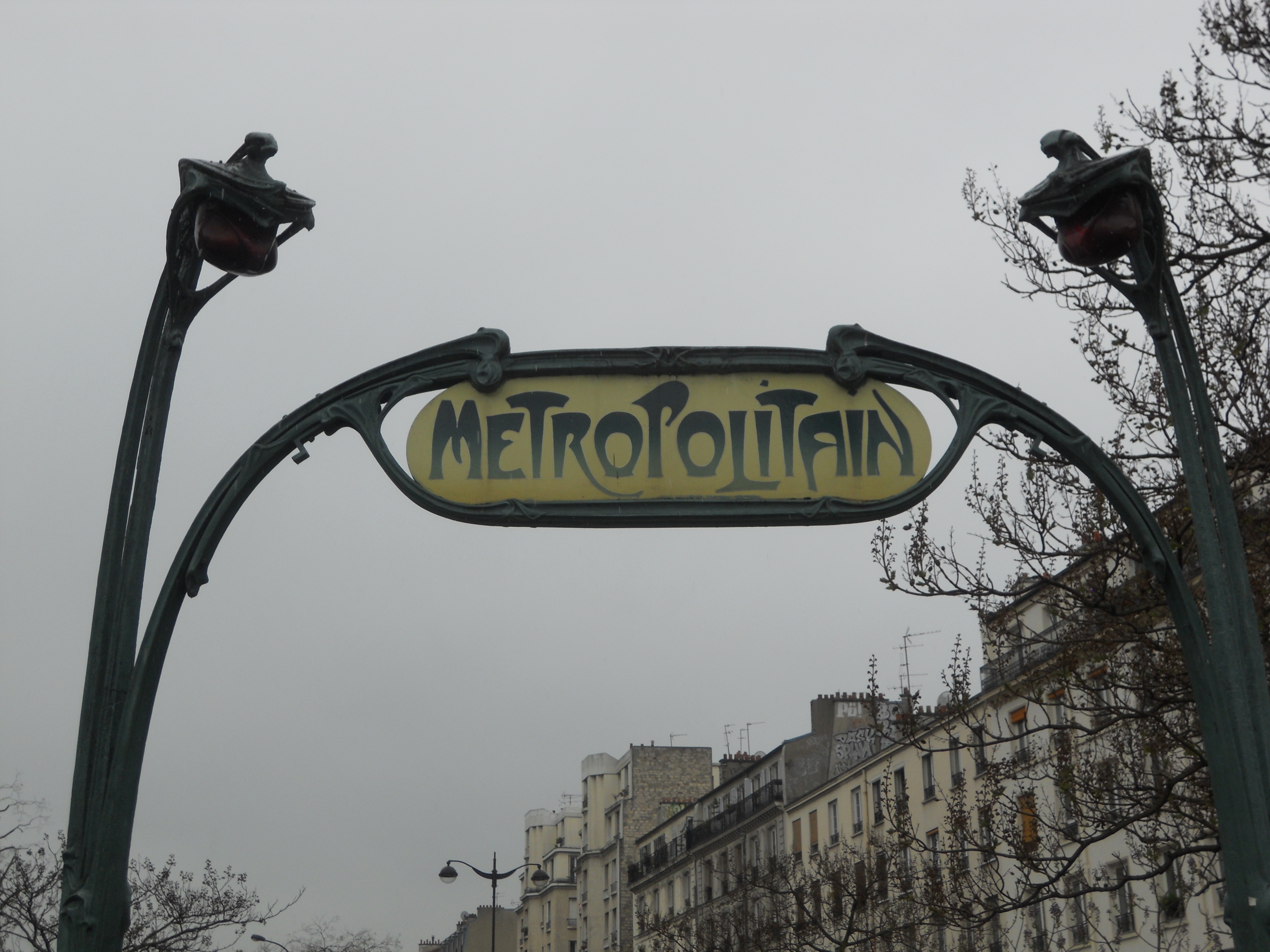
Subway entrance
