= Shamrock III =

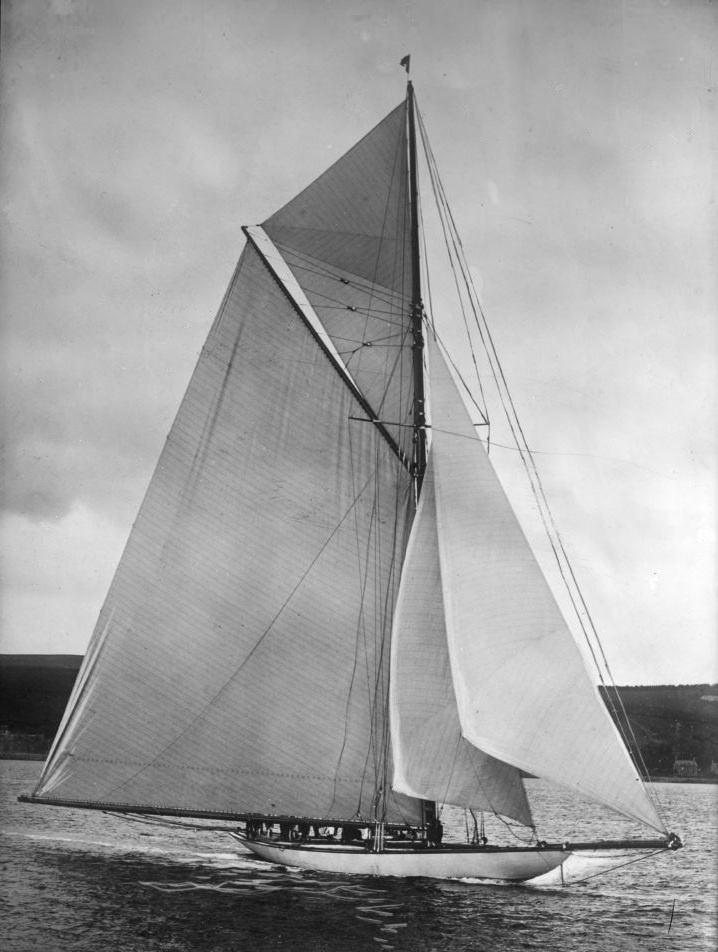

Shamrock III was a yacht that was the Royal Ulster Yacht Club's entry for the 1903 America's Cup.

== History ==
The yacht was designed by William Fife, and was built by William Denny and Brothers of Dumbarton, Scotland. The yacht was launched on 17 March 1903. Captained by Robert Wringe with second Captain Charles Burbridge Bevis; it participated in the 1903 America's Cup and was defeated by the New York Yacht Club's Reliance in all three races, on 20 August 1903, 25 August 190, and 3 September 1903. In 1920 the yacht was used for test racing against Shamrock IV and afterward was scrapped.
