= Couronnes station =

Métro station in Paris, France

Couronnes
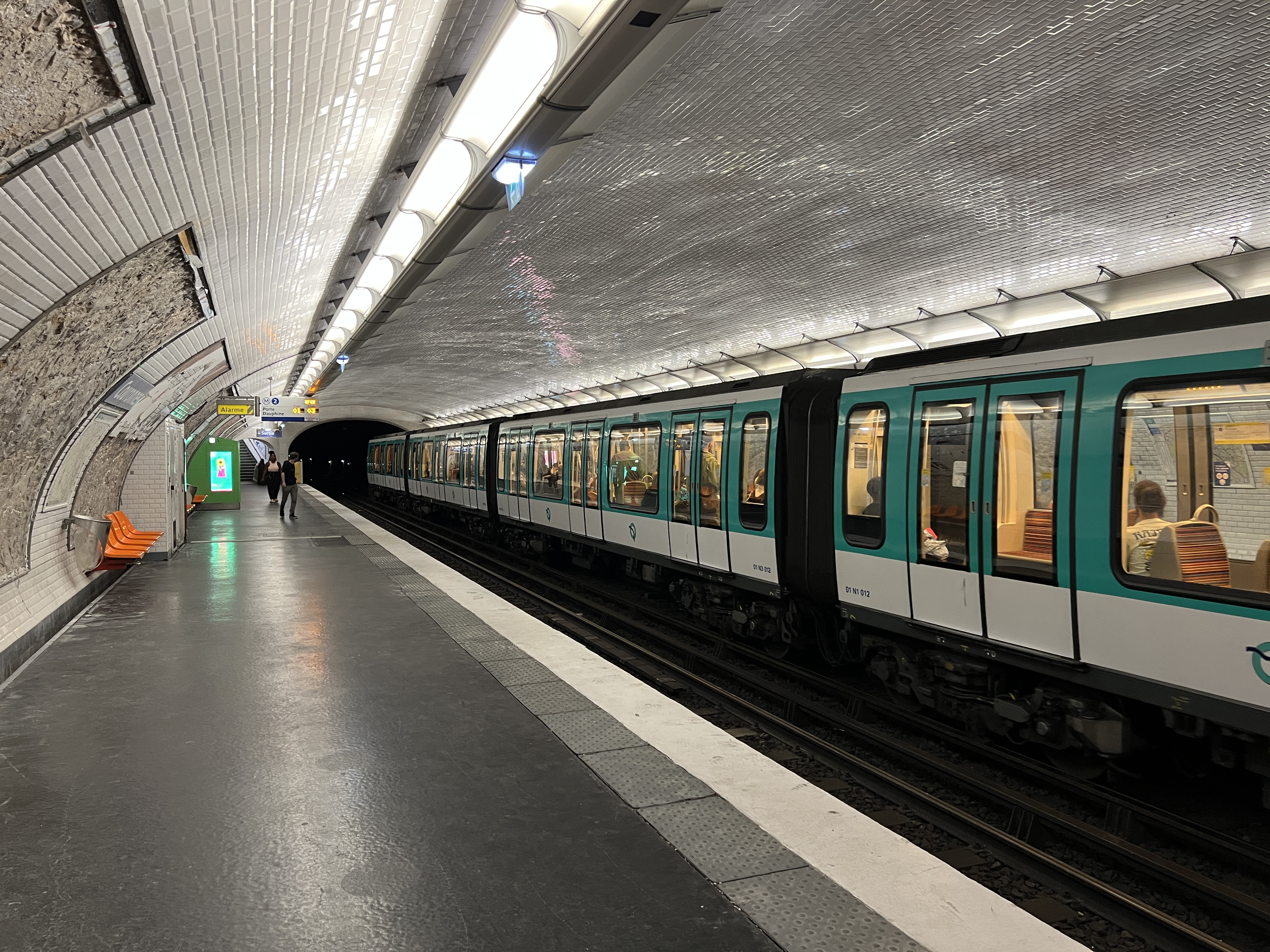

General information
- Location: 37, Boul. de Belleville; 11th arrondissement of Paris; Île-de-France; France
- Coordinates: 48°52′10″N 2°22′47″E
- Owner: RATP
- Operator: RATP

Other information
- Fare zone: 1

History
- Opened: 31 January 1903

Services
Preceding station	Paris Metro	Following station
Belleville towards Porte Dauphine	Line 2	Ménilmontant towards Nation
Route map
Location
- Location within Paris

Couronnes (French pronunciation: [kuʁɔn]) is a station on Line 2 of the Paris Métro, on the border of the 11th and 20th arrondissements.

== History ==
The station was opened on 31 January 1903 as part of the extension of line 2 (known at the time as "2 Nord") from Anvers to Bagnolet (now called Alexandre Dumas). It is named after the Rue des Couronnes, which was named after either the local village of Les Couronnes-sous-Savies, or from a tavern called Les Trois Couronnes. It was the location of the Barrière des Trois-Couronnes, a gate built for the collection of taxation as part of the Wall of the Farmers-General; the gate was built between 1784 and 1788 and demolished during the 19th century.

In 2020, with the COVID-19 crisis, 1,623,475 passengers entered this station, that places it in 157th position for metro stations in terms of attendance.

=== 1903 disaster ===
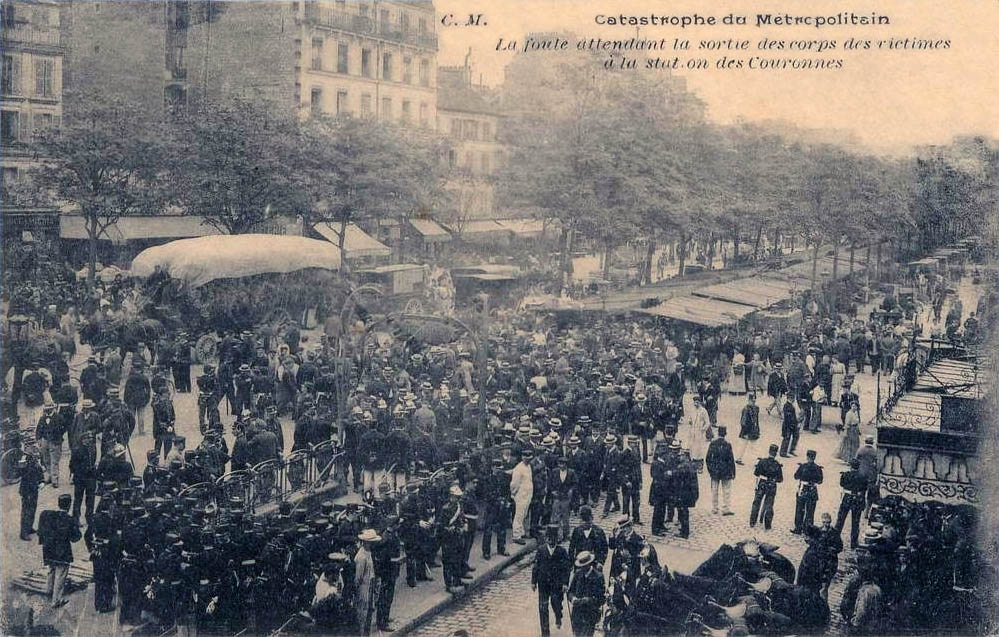
The aftermath of the disaster

The station was the site of a fire and stampede that caused the worst catastrophe in the history of the Paris Métro, killing 84 people on 10 August 1903 (earlier estimates had put the number of fatalities at over 100).

== Passenger services ==
=== Access ===
The station has a single entrance that leads to the central reservation of Boulevard de Belleville, facing no. 37.

=== Station layout ===
Street Level

B1	Mezzanine for platform connection

Platform level	Side platform, doors will open on the right
Platform level	Platform 1	← toward Porte Dauphine (Belleville)
Platform level	Platform 2	toward Nation (Ménilmontant) →
Platform level	Side platform, doors will open on the right

=== Platforms ===
Couronnes is a station of standard configuration. It has two platforms separated by the metro tracks and the vault is elliptical. The decoration is of the style used for the majority of metro stations: the lighting canopies are white and rounded in the Gaudin style of the metro renovation of the 2000s, and the bevelled white ceramic tiles cover the walls, the vault, and the tunnel exits. The advertising frames are metallic and the name of the station is in Parisine font on an enamel plate. The seats are red Motte style.

=== Bus connections ===
The station is served by lines 20, 71 and 96 of the RATP Bus Network and, at night, by lines N12 and N23 of the Noctilien network.

== Gallery ==
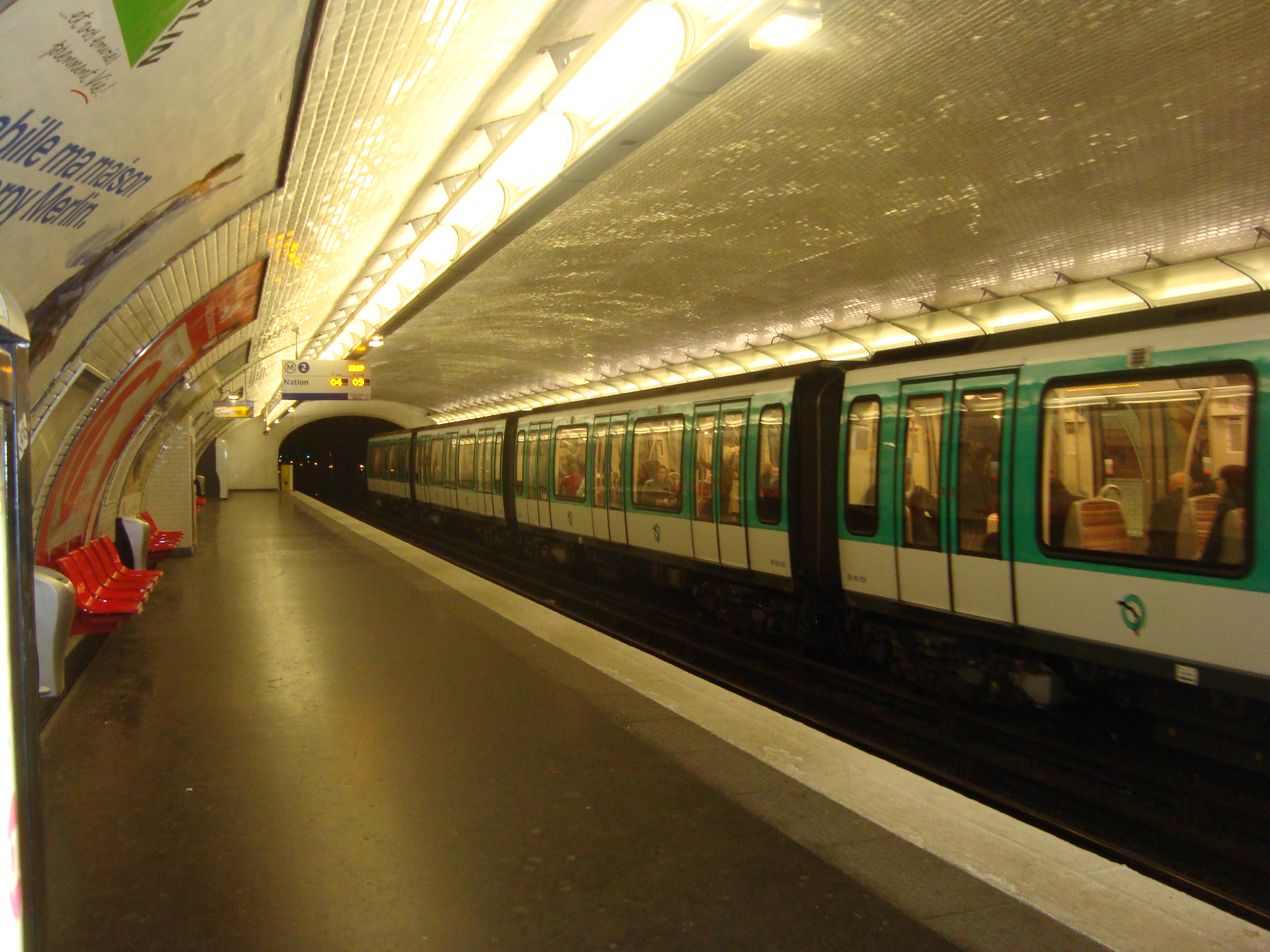
MF 01 rolling stock on Line 2 at Couronnes
