= Reliance (yacht) =

Winning yacht of the 1903 America's Cup

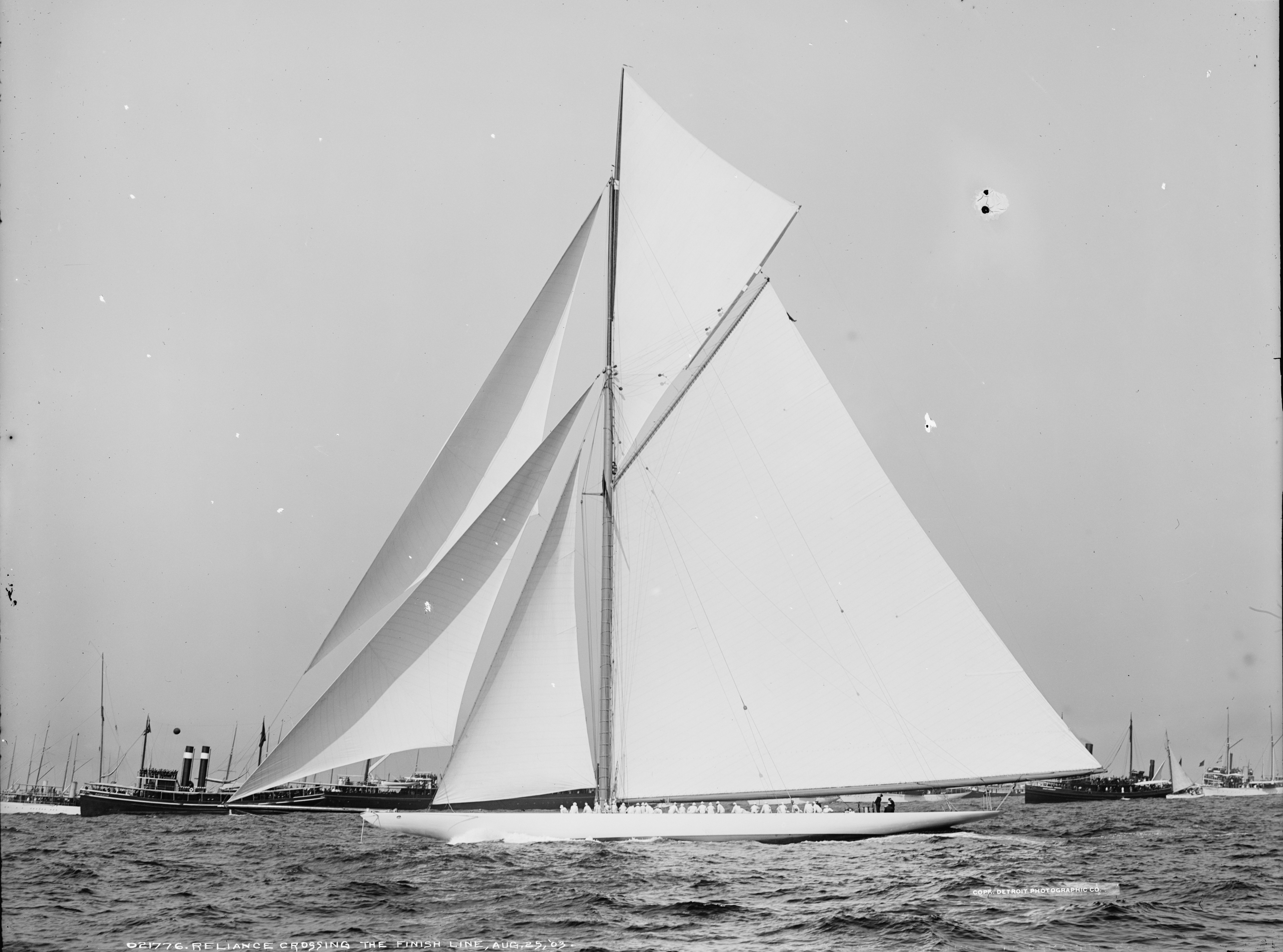
- Reliance crossing finish line August 25, 1903
- Yacht club: New York Yacht Club
- Nation: United States
- Designer(s): Nathanael Greene Herreshoff
- Builder: Herreshoff Manufacturing Company
- Launched: 1903
- Owner(s): Cornelius Vanderbilt III syndicate
- Fate: Scrapped 1913

Racing career
- Skippers: Charlie Barr
- Notable victories: 1903 America's Cup
- America's Cup: 1903

Specifications
- Type: Gaff cutter
- Displacement: 189 tons
- Length: LOA 201 ft 0 in (61.26 m); LWL 90 ft 0 in (27.43 m)
- Beam: 26 ft 0 in (7.92 m)
- Draft: 20 ft 0 in (6.10 m)
- Sail area: 1,501 m^{2} (16,160 sq ft)
- Crew: 64

Reliance was the 1903 America's Cup defender designed by Nat Herreshoff.

Reliance was funded by a nine-member syndicate of members of the New York Yacht Club headed by Cornelius Vanderbilt III.

Reliance was designed to take full advantage of the Seawanhaka '90-foot' rating rule and was suitable only for use in certain conditions. The 1903 America's Cup was the last to be raced according to the Seawanhaka rule.

== Design ==
The design took advantage of a loophole in the Seawanhaka "90-foot" rating rule, to produce a racing yacht with long overhangs at each end, so that when heeled over, her waterline length increased dramatically. Because a boat's hull speed is a function of its waterline length, Reliance's top speed therefore was dramatically higher.

To save weight, she was completely unfinished below deck, with exposed frames. Reliance was the first racing boat to be fitted with winches below decks, in an era when her competitors relied on sheer man-power. Despite this a crew of 64 was required for racing due to the large sail plan.

From the tip of her bowsprit to the end of her 108-foot (33 m) boom, Reliance measured 201 feet (61 m), and the tip of her mast was 199 feet (61 m) above the water (the height of a 20-story building). Everything else was to an equally gargantuan scale; her spinnaker pole was 84 feet (26 m) long, and her total sail area of 1,501 m^{2} (16,160 sq ft) was the equivalent of eight 12 meter class yachts.

Reliance was built for one purpose: to successfully defend the America's Cup.

Call the boat a freak, anything you like, but we cannot handicap ourselves, even if our boat is only fit for the junk heap the day after the race.

— Cornelius Vanderbilt

Design of Reliance
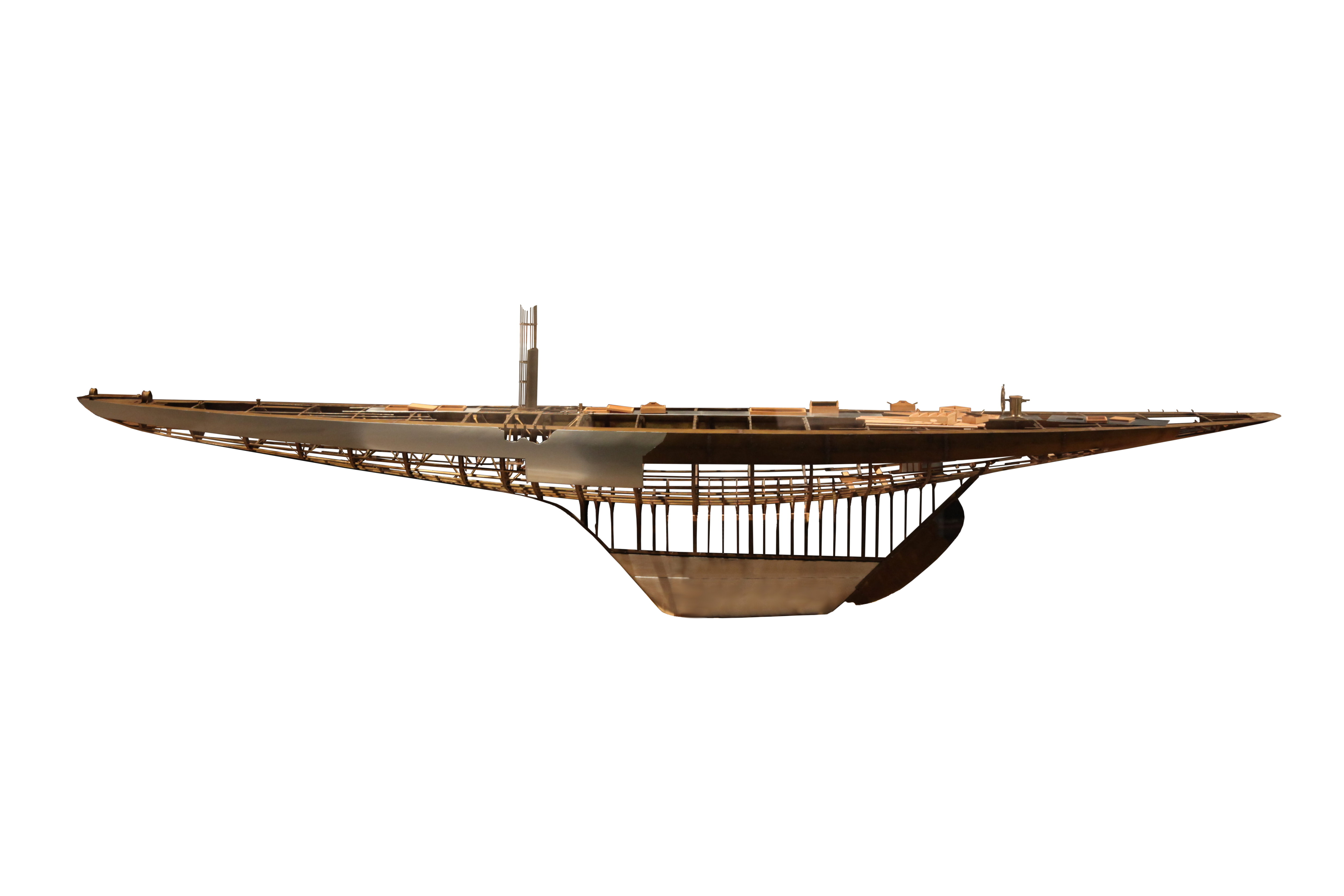
The extreme design of the hull

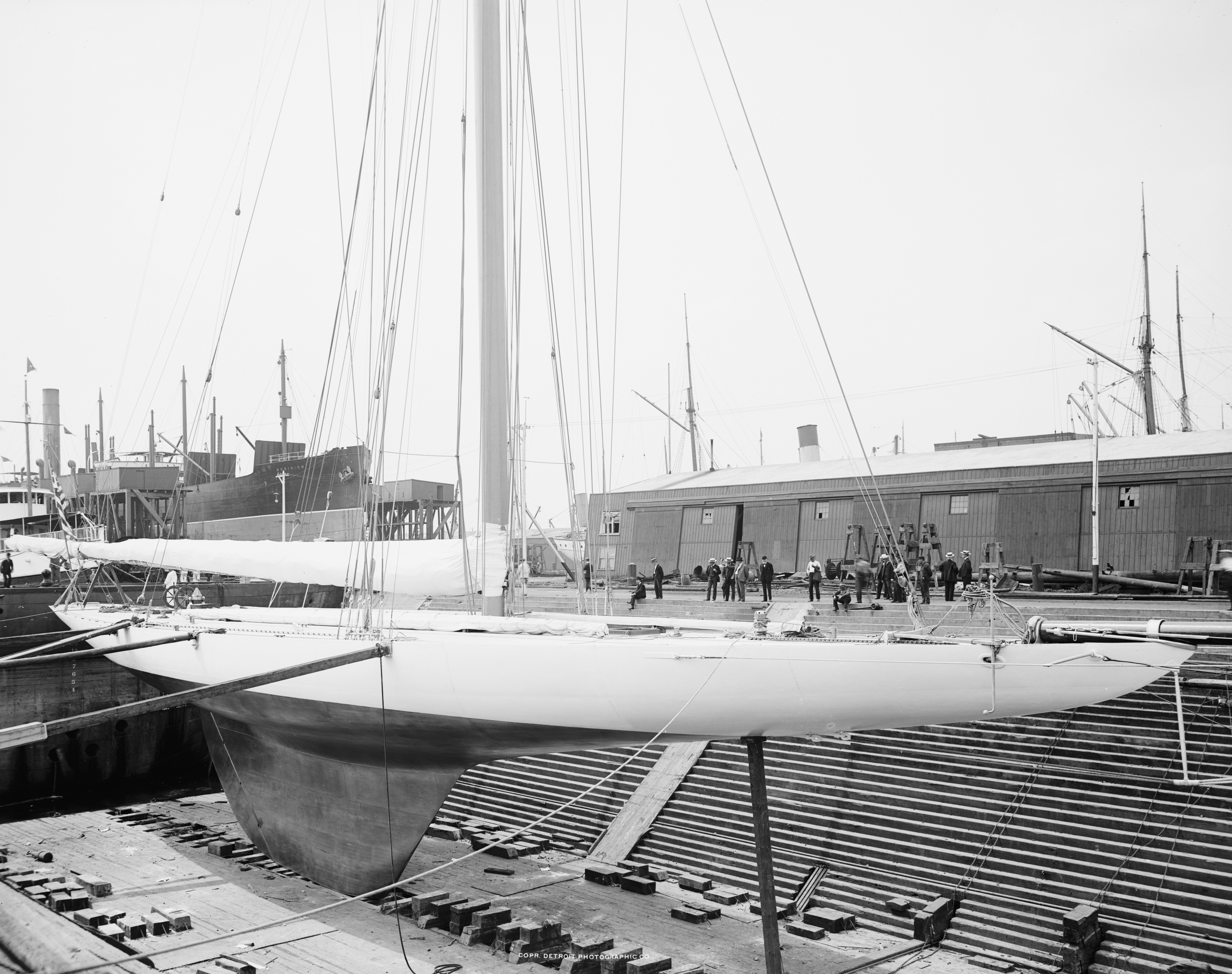
Reliance in drydock

== Career ==
Her racing career was extraordinarily brief – and undefeated. She bested her America's Cup challenger, Sir Thomas Lipton's Shamrock III, designed by William Fife, in all three races, with Shamrock III losing by such a margin in the third that she was forced to retire. Reliance's designer, Nathanael Herreshoff, immediately proposed the Universal rating rule to avoid such extreme, dangerous and expensive vessels, which made Reliance an inadequate contestant in subsequent races. There was much speculation as to whether Reliance's victory was due to the design of the yacht or the skill of Charlie Barr in sailing her. Lipton himself proposed to allow the two boats to swap crew after the race to decide the matter, but the offer was refused by the owners of Reliance. Her very successful career was short-lived, and she was sold for scrap in 1913.

They tell me I have a beautiful boat. I don't want a beautiful boat. What I want is a boat to lift the Cup – a Reliance. Give me a homely boat, the homeliest boat that was ever designed, if she is as fast as Reliance.

— Sir Thomas Lipton, after his 1903 defeat

Photographs of Reliance under way
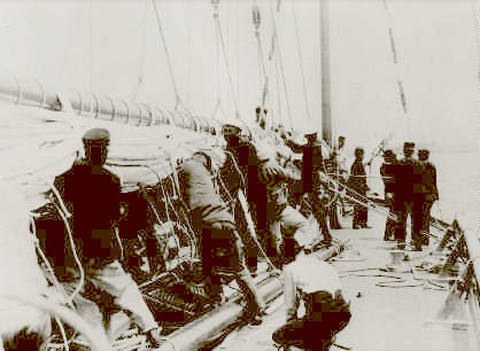
Crew of Reliance

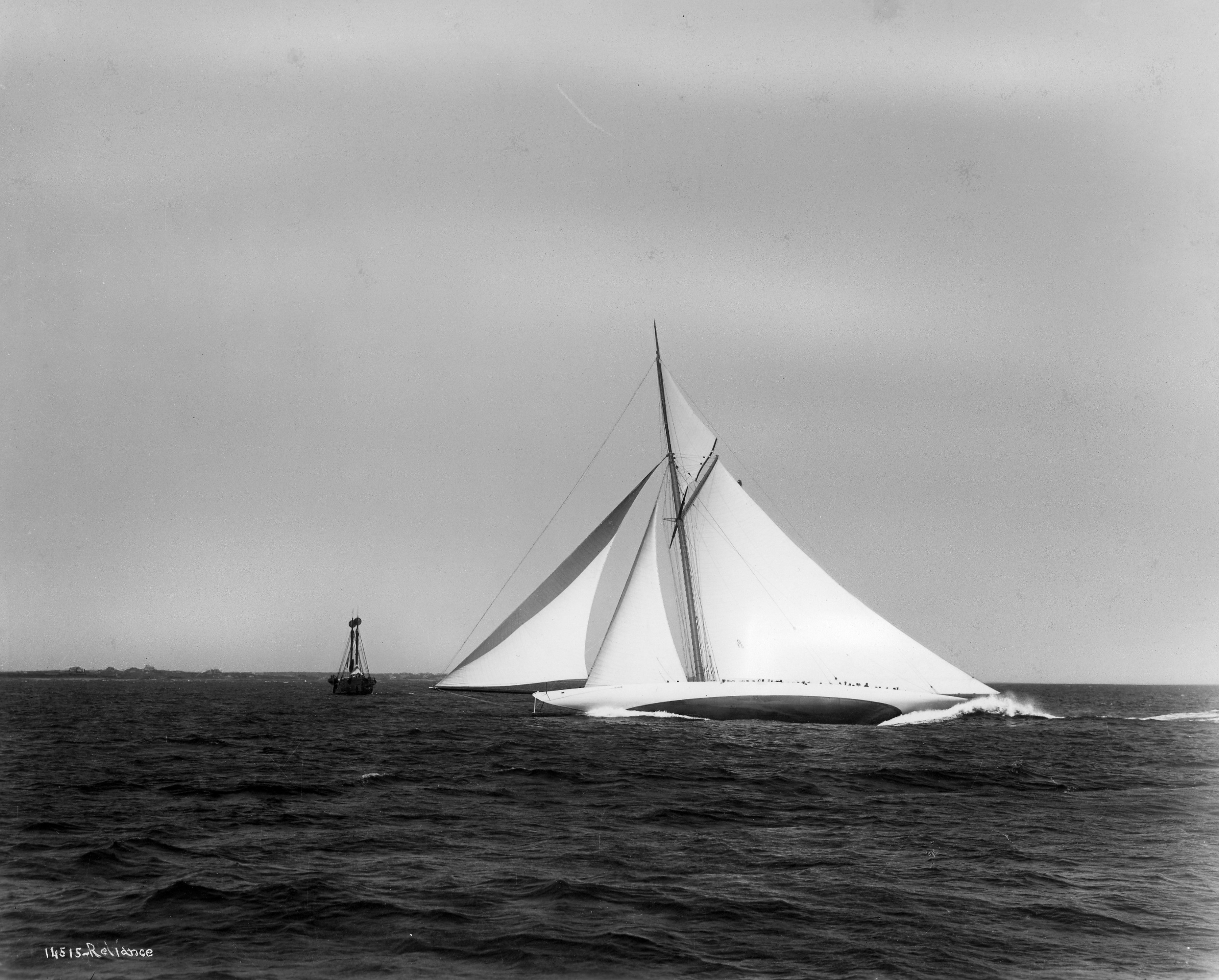
Reliance passing the Brenton Reef light ship at high speed, 1903. Photograph by Nathaniel Livermore Stebbins.

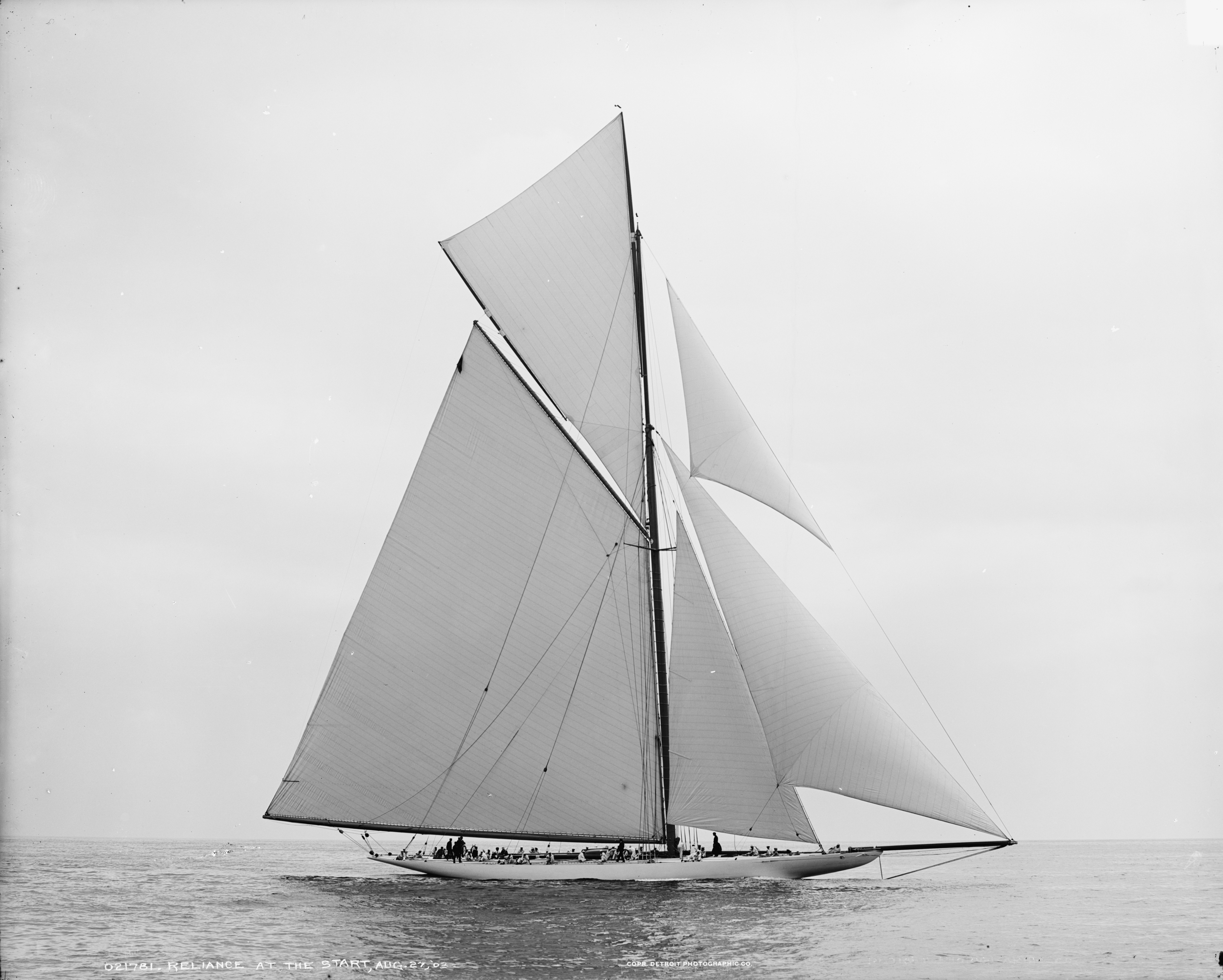
Reliance America's Cup defender Reliance at the start, August 25th, 1903.

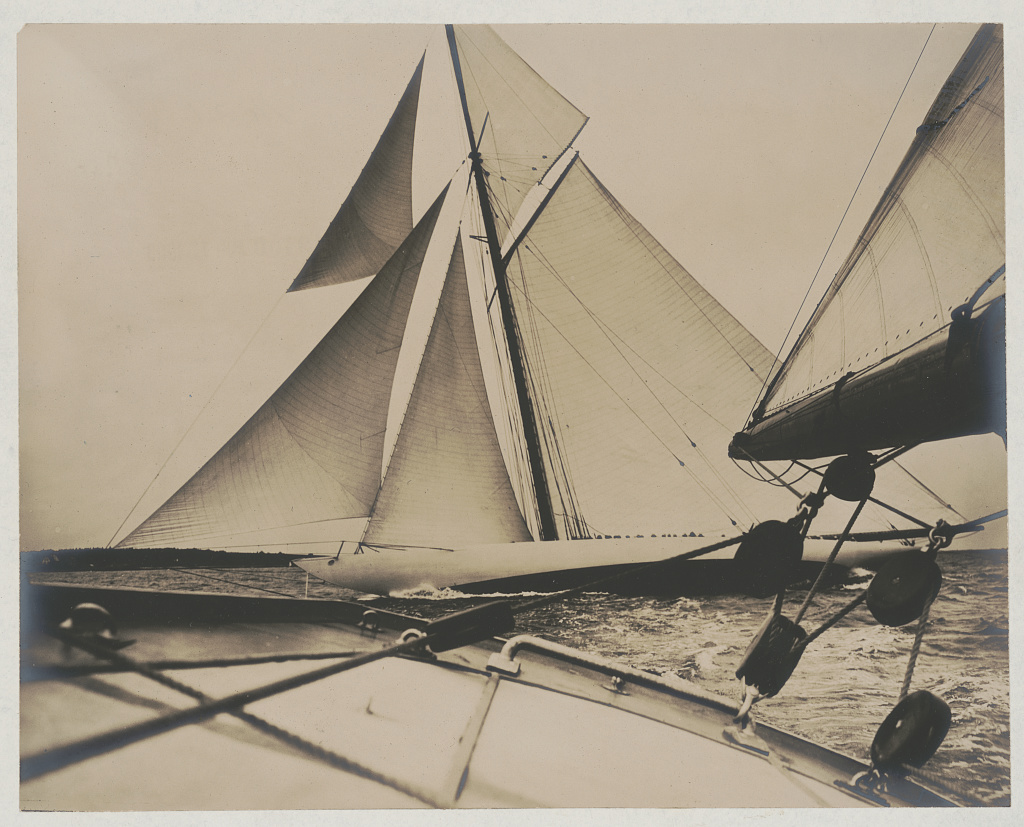
Side view from unidentified sailboat
