= List of parks and gardens in Paris =

Map of green spaces in Paris.

Paris today has more than 421 municipal parks and gardens, covering more than three thousand hectares and containing more than 250,000 trees. The following is a partial list of public parks and gardens in the city.

== Woodlands ==
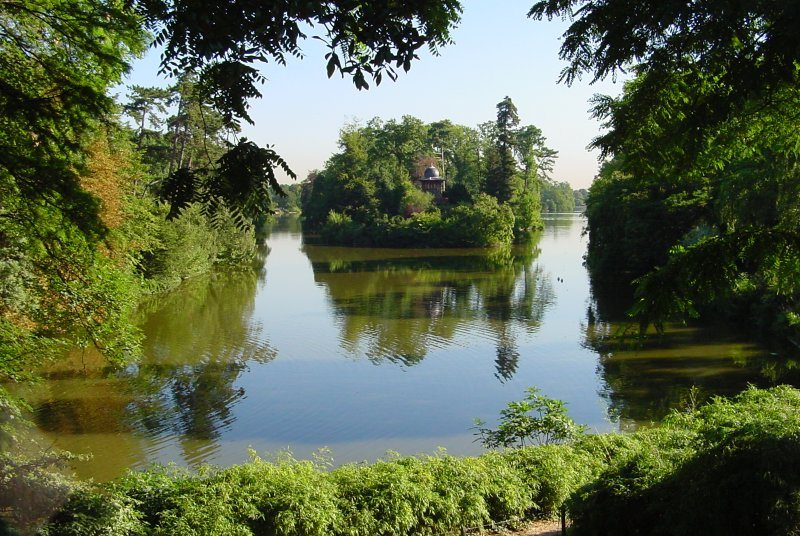
The Bois de Boulogne (16th arrondissement)

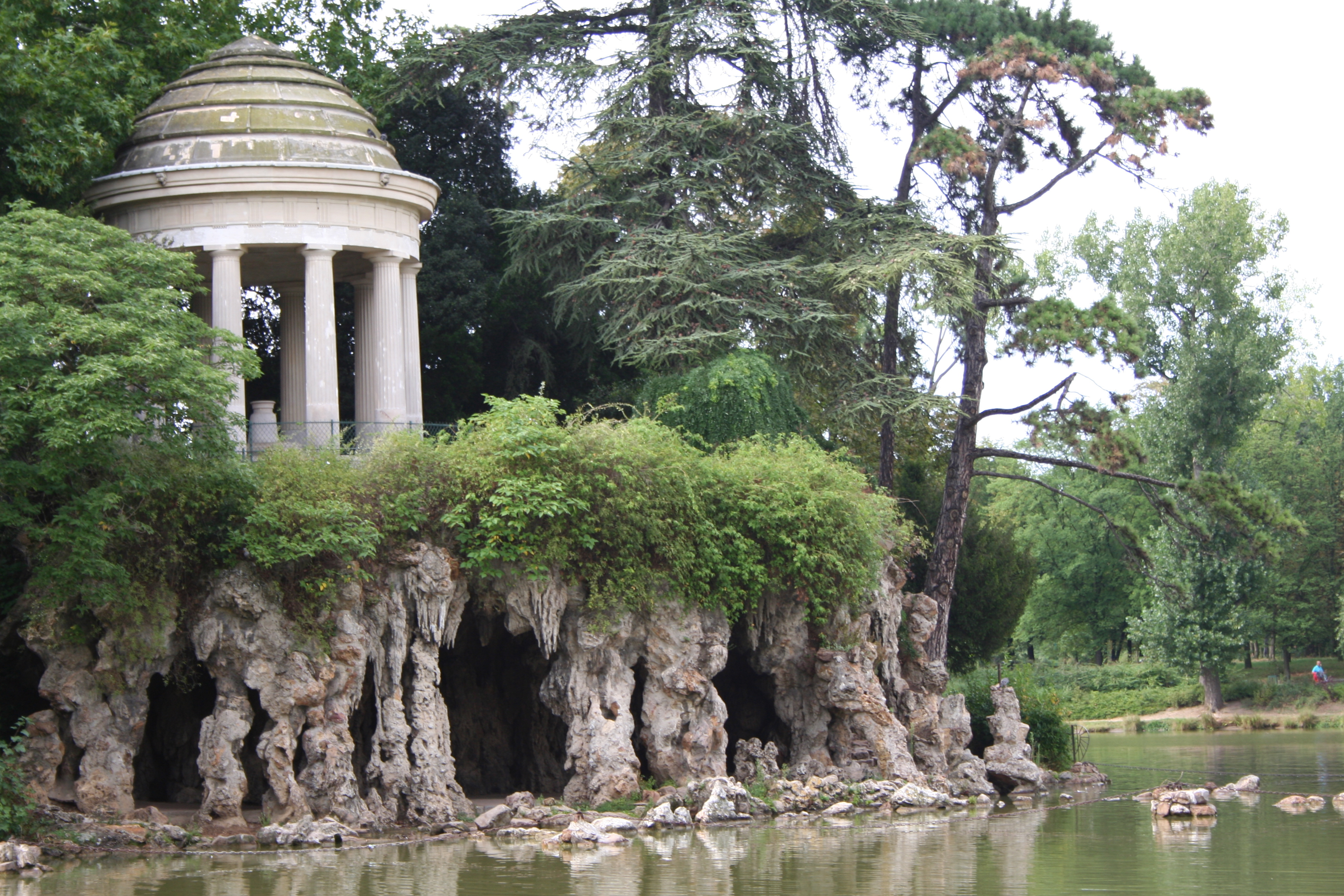
Bois de Vincennes (12th arrondissement)
- Bois de Boulogne
- Bois de Vincennes

== Parks ==
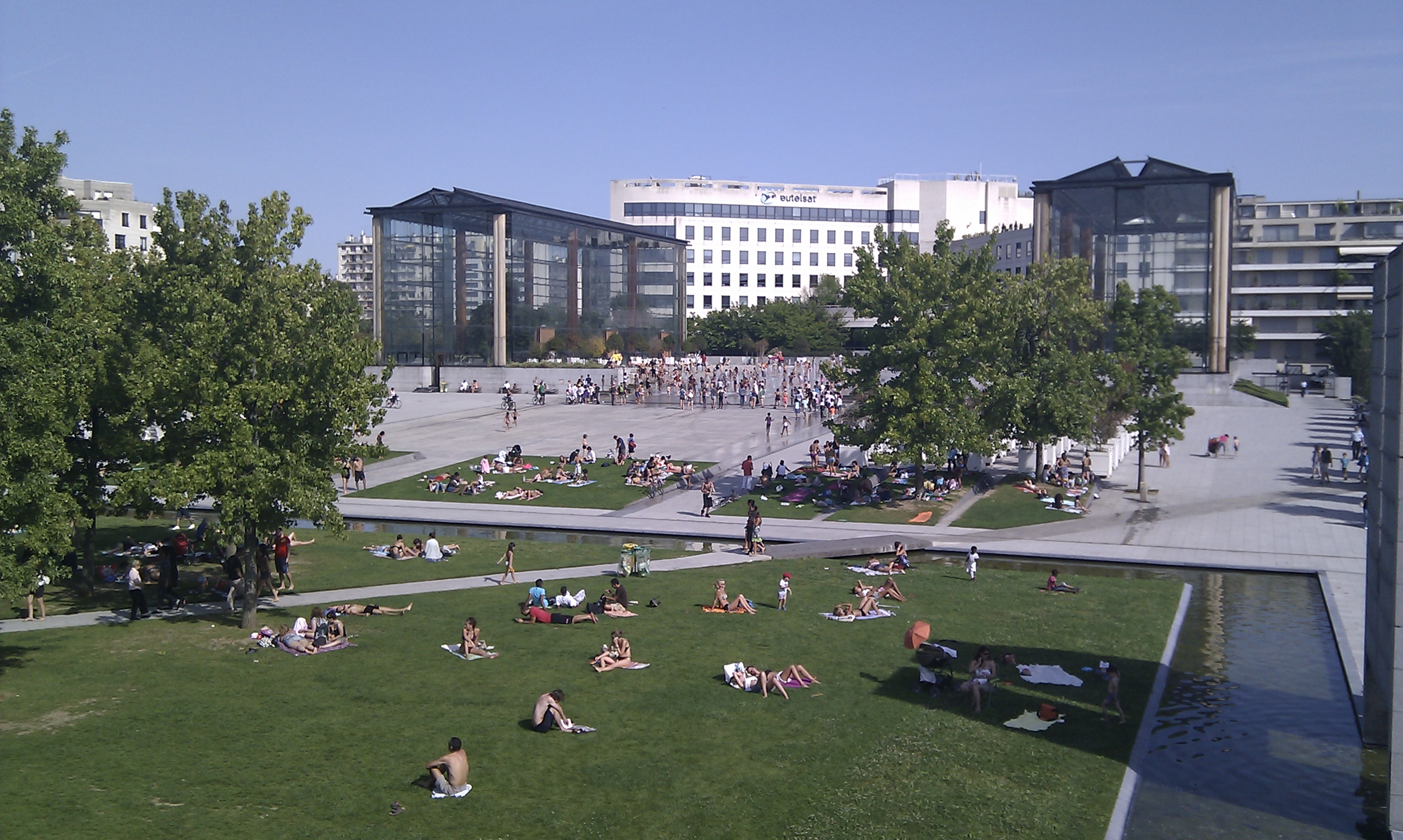
Parc André Citroën (15th arrondissement)

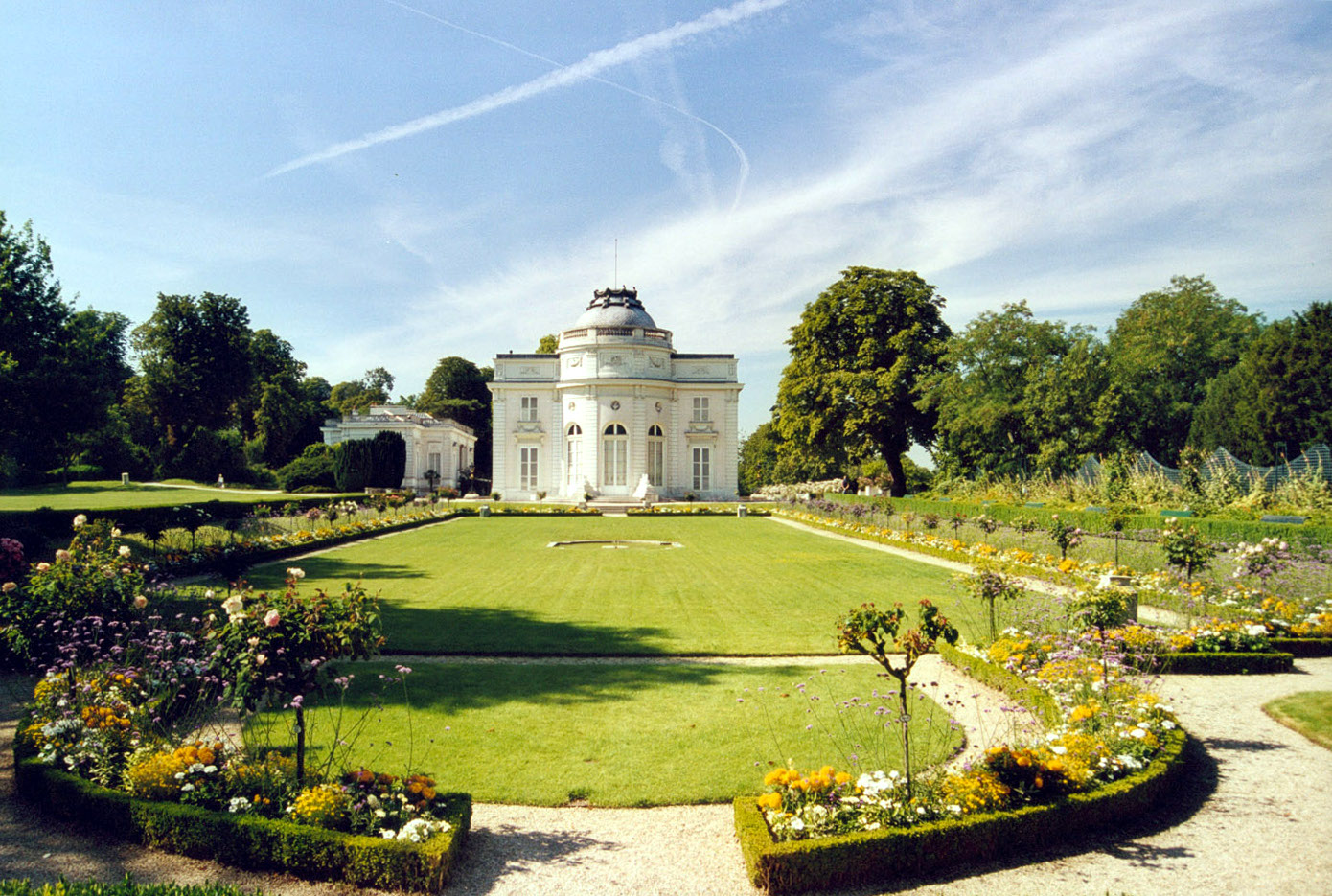
The Parc de Bagatelle (16th arrondissement)

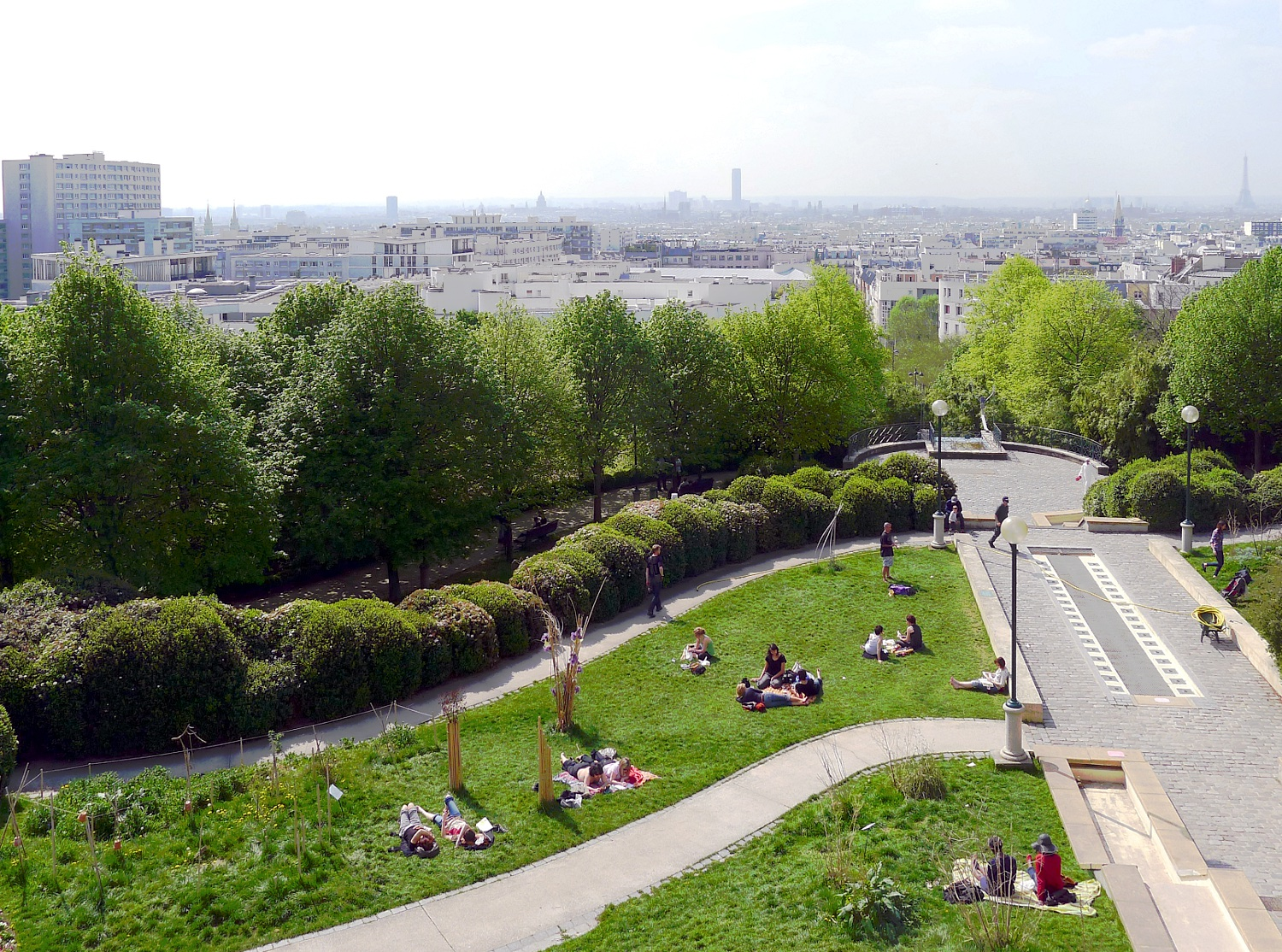
The Parc de Belleville (20th arrondissement)

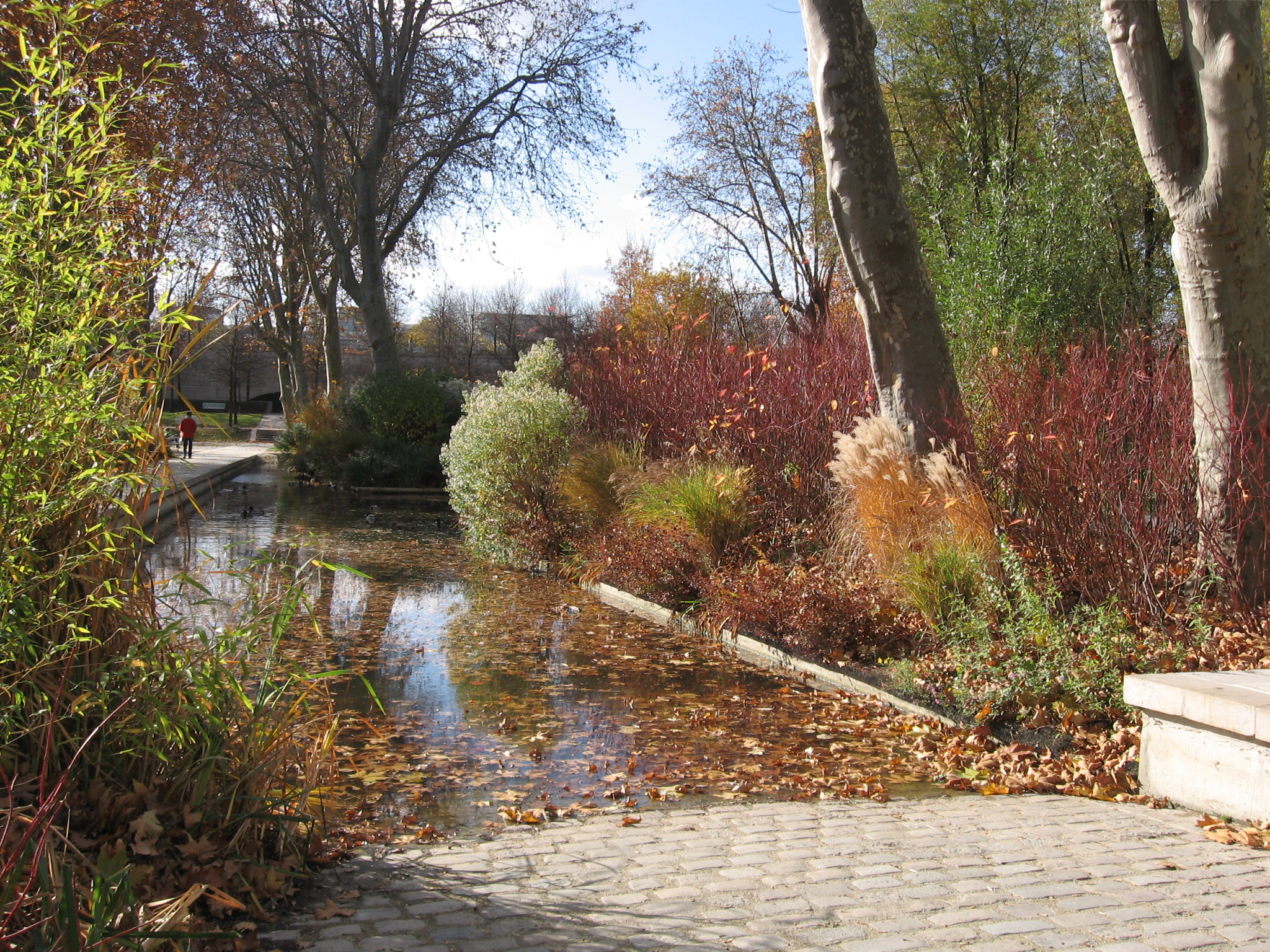
The Parc de Bercy (12th arrondissement)

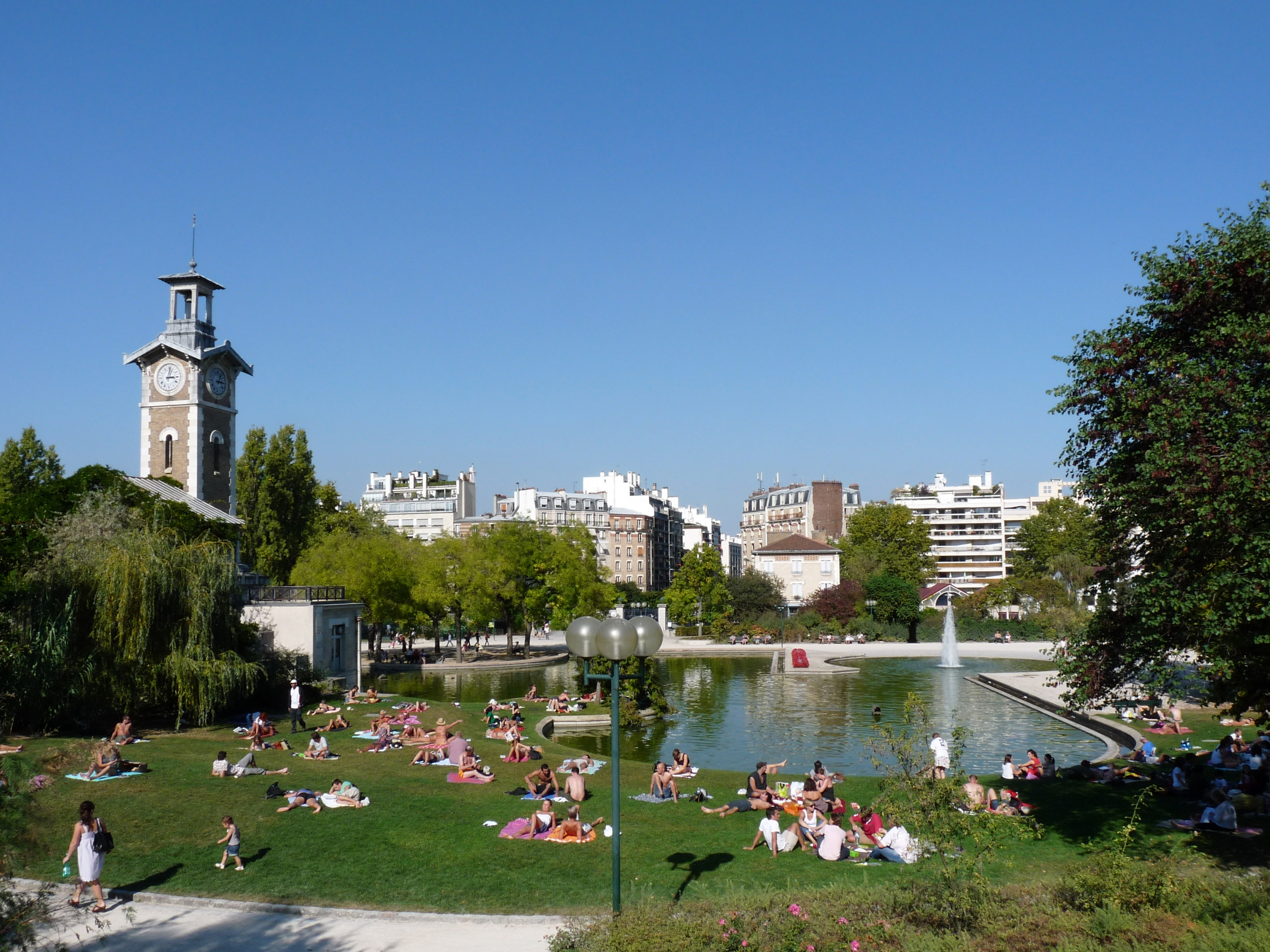
Parc Georges-Brassens (15th arrondissement)

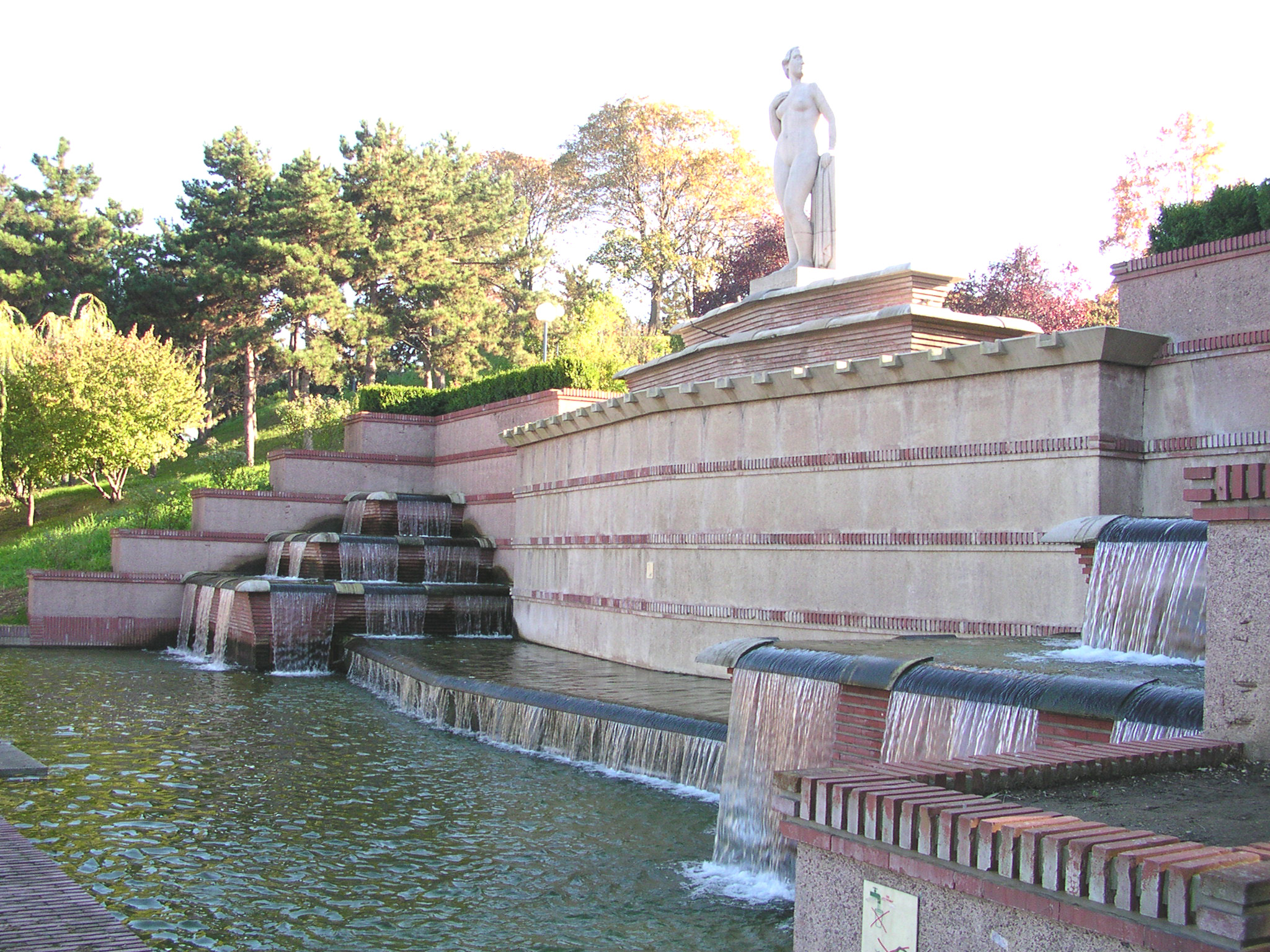
The Parc de la Butte-du-Chapeau-Rouge (19th arrondissement)

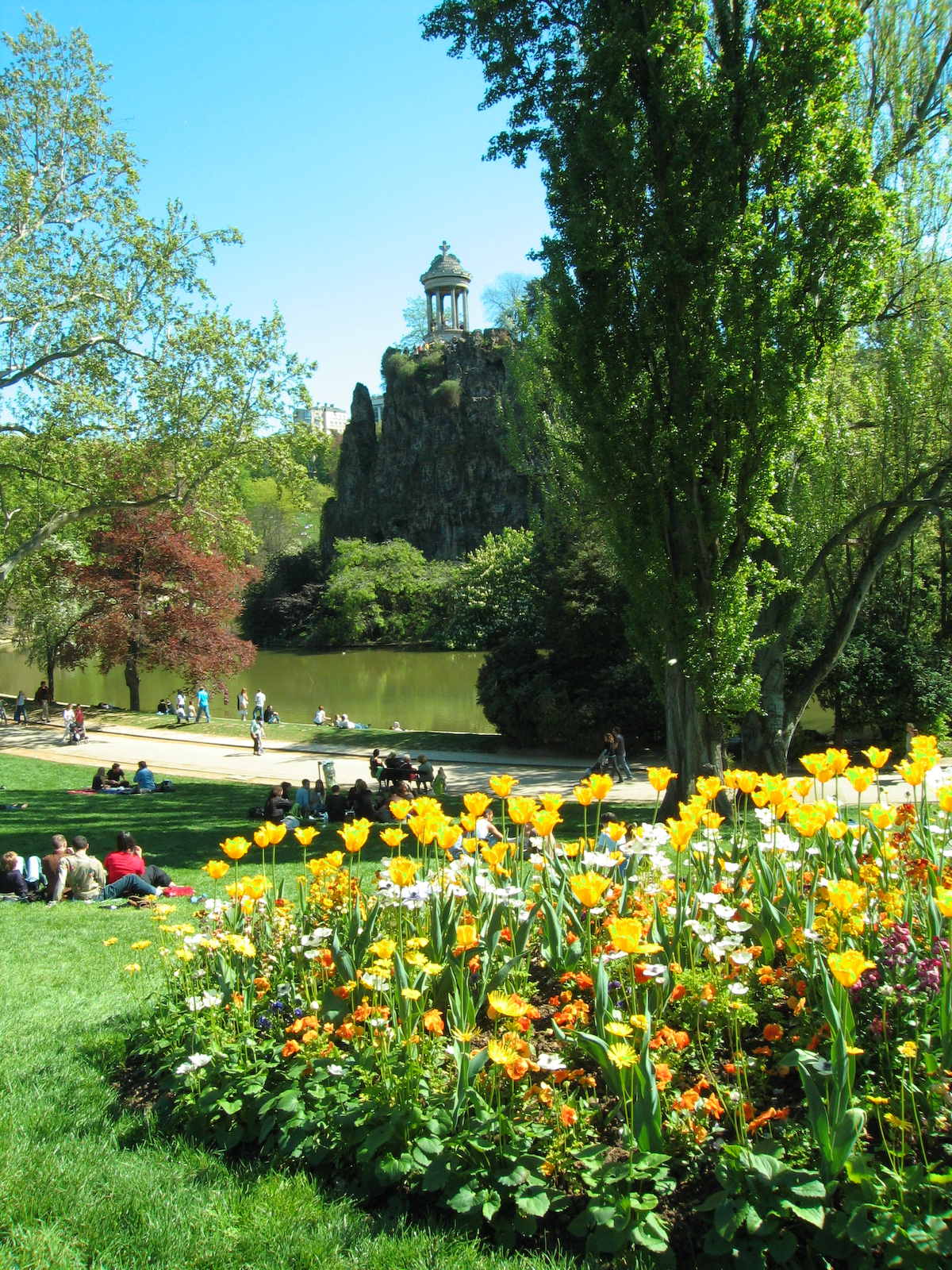
The Parc des Buttes Chaumont (19th arrondissement)

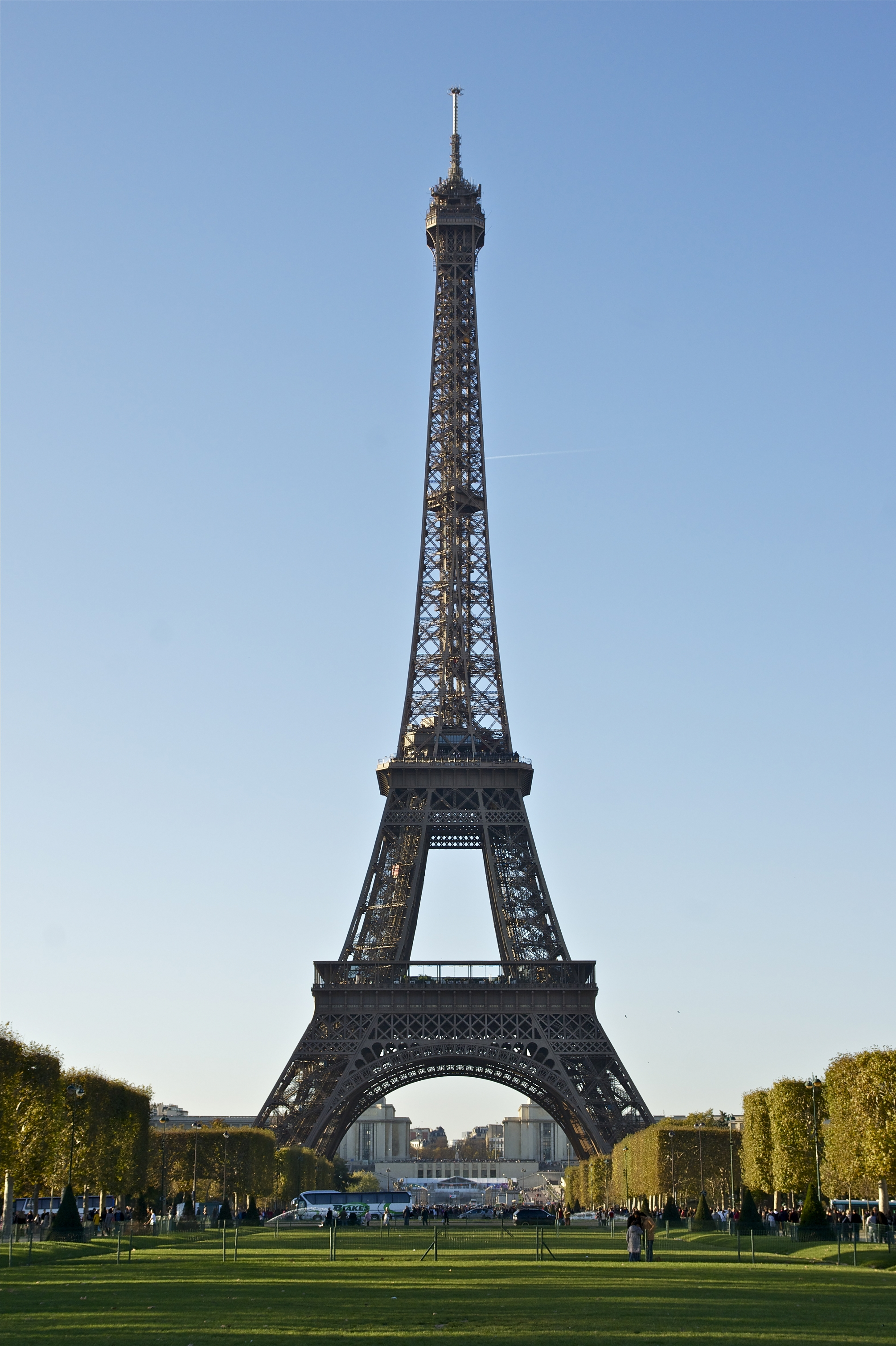
The Parc du Champs-de-Mars (7th arrondissement)

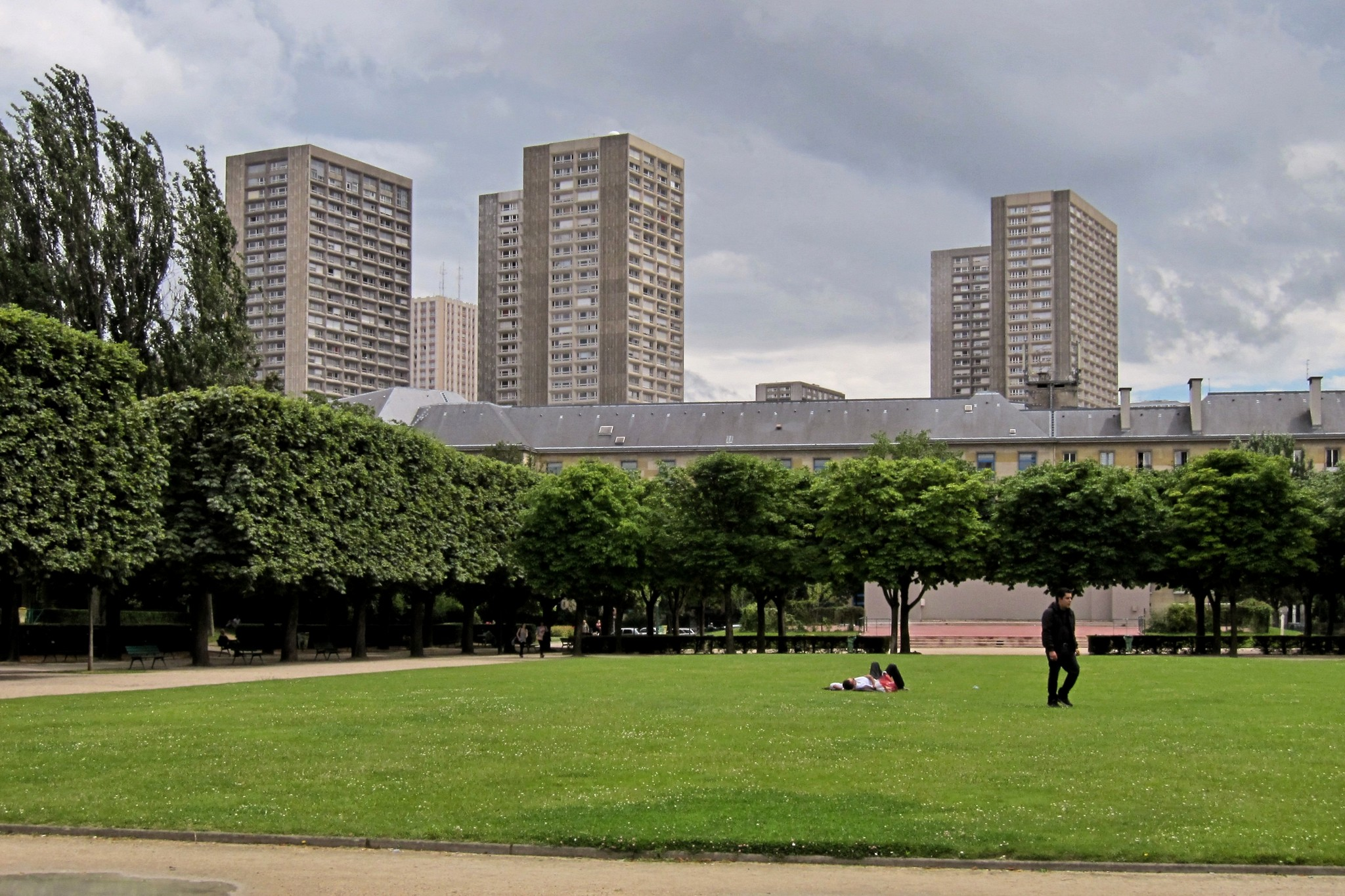
The Parc de Choisy (13th arrondissement)

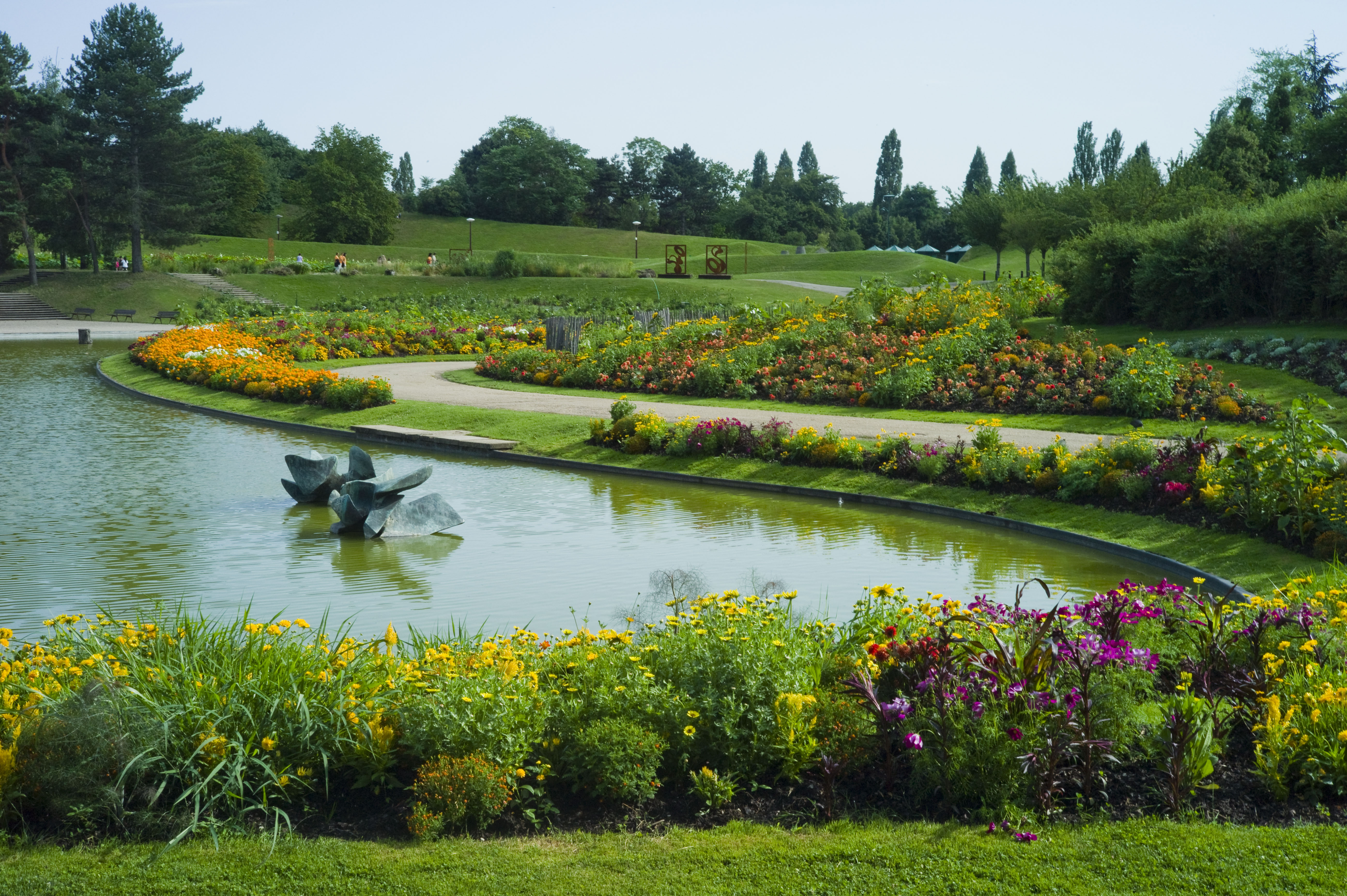
Parc floral de Paris (12th arrondissement)

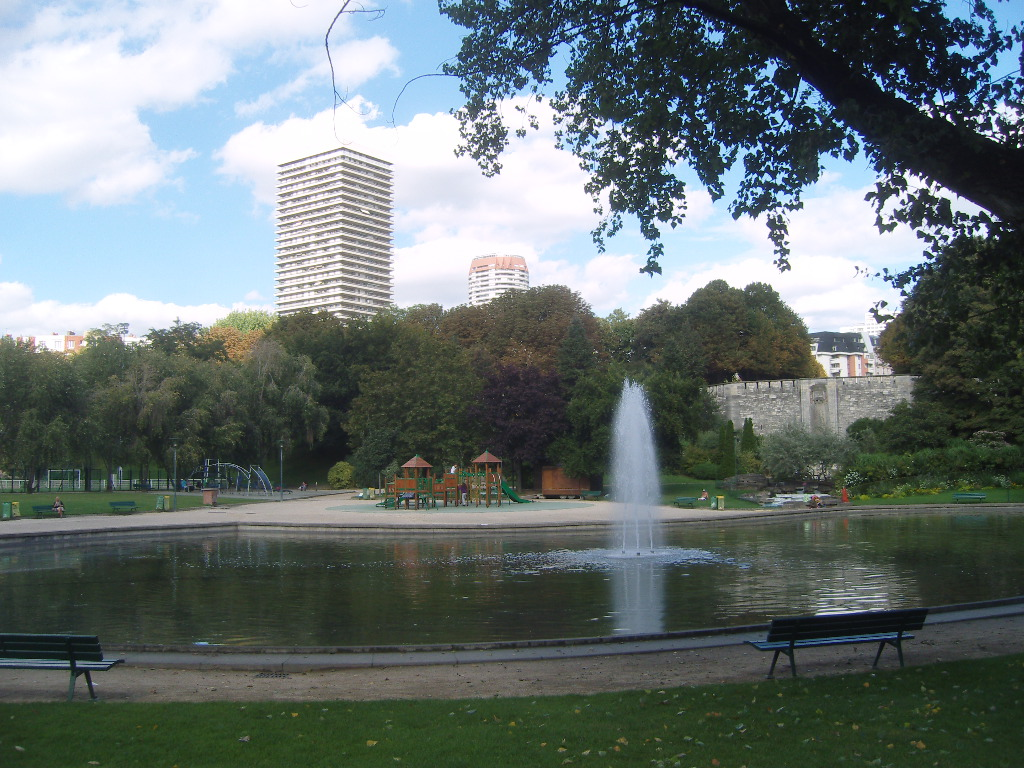
Parc Kellermann (13th arrondissement)

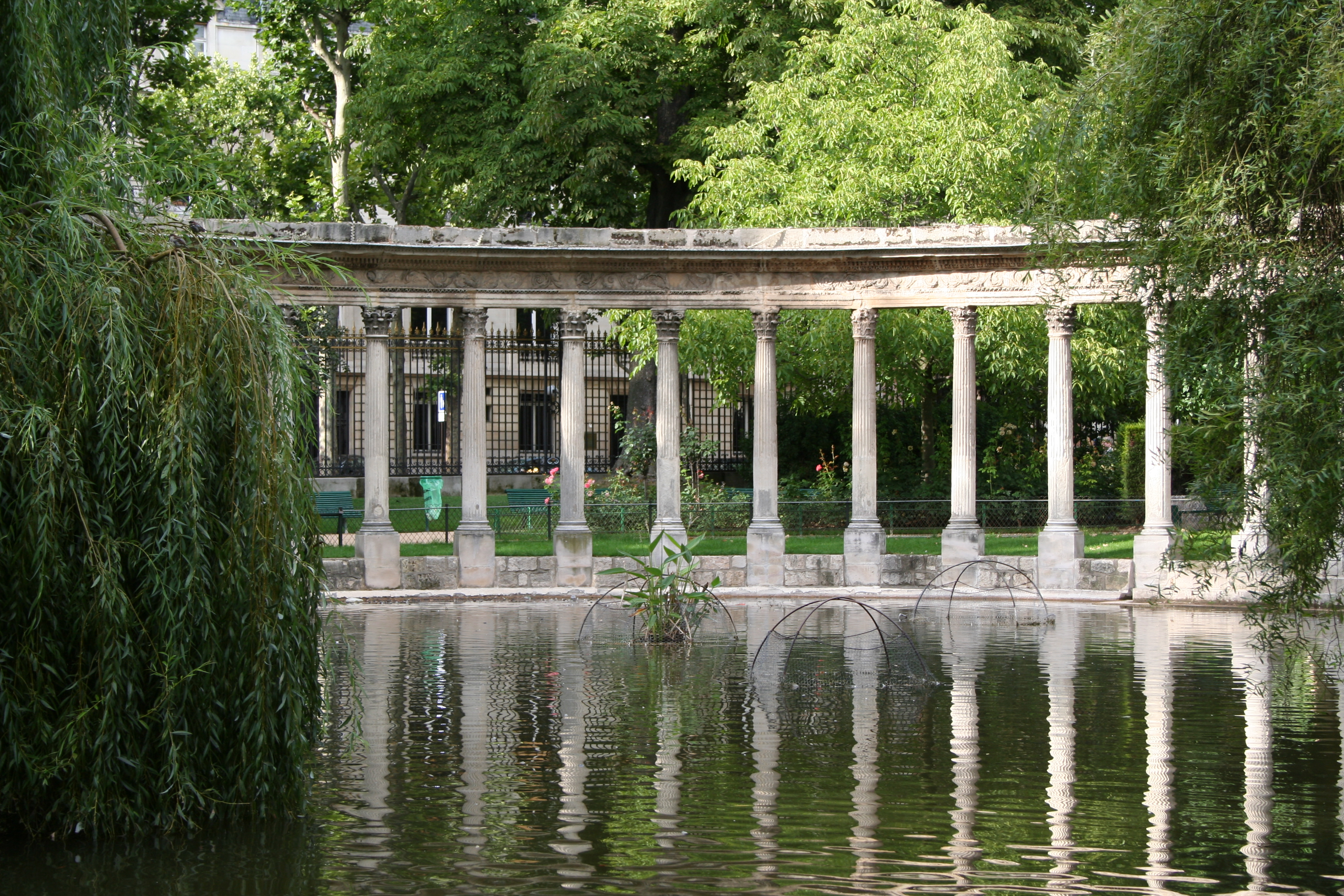
Parc Monceau (8th arrondissement)

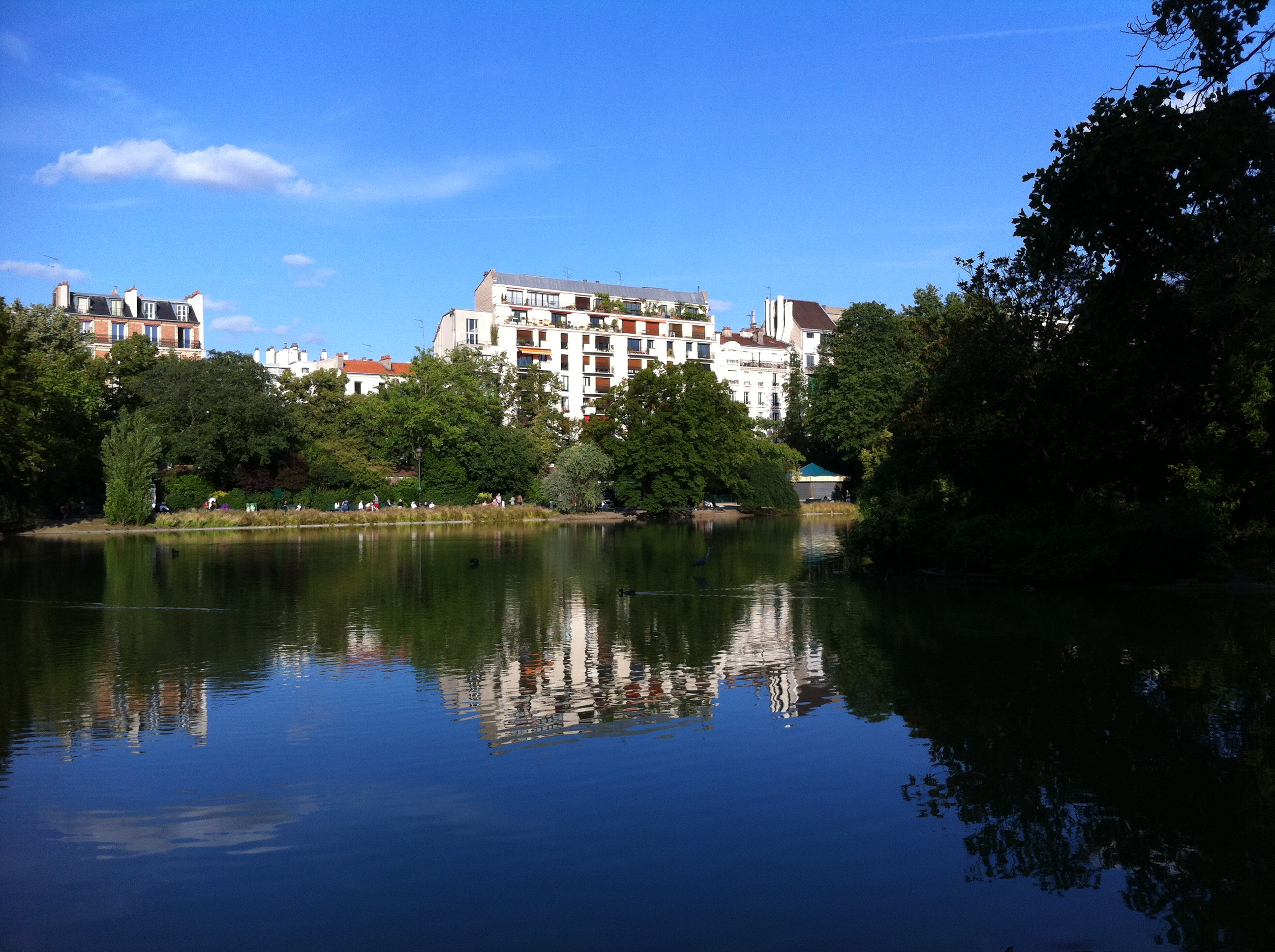
Parc Montsouris (14th arrondissement)

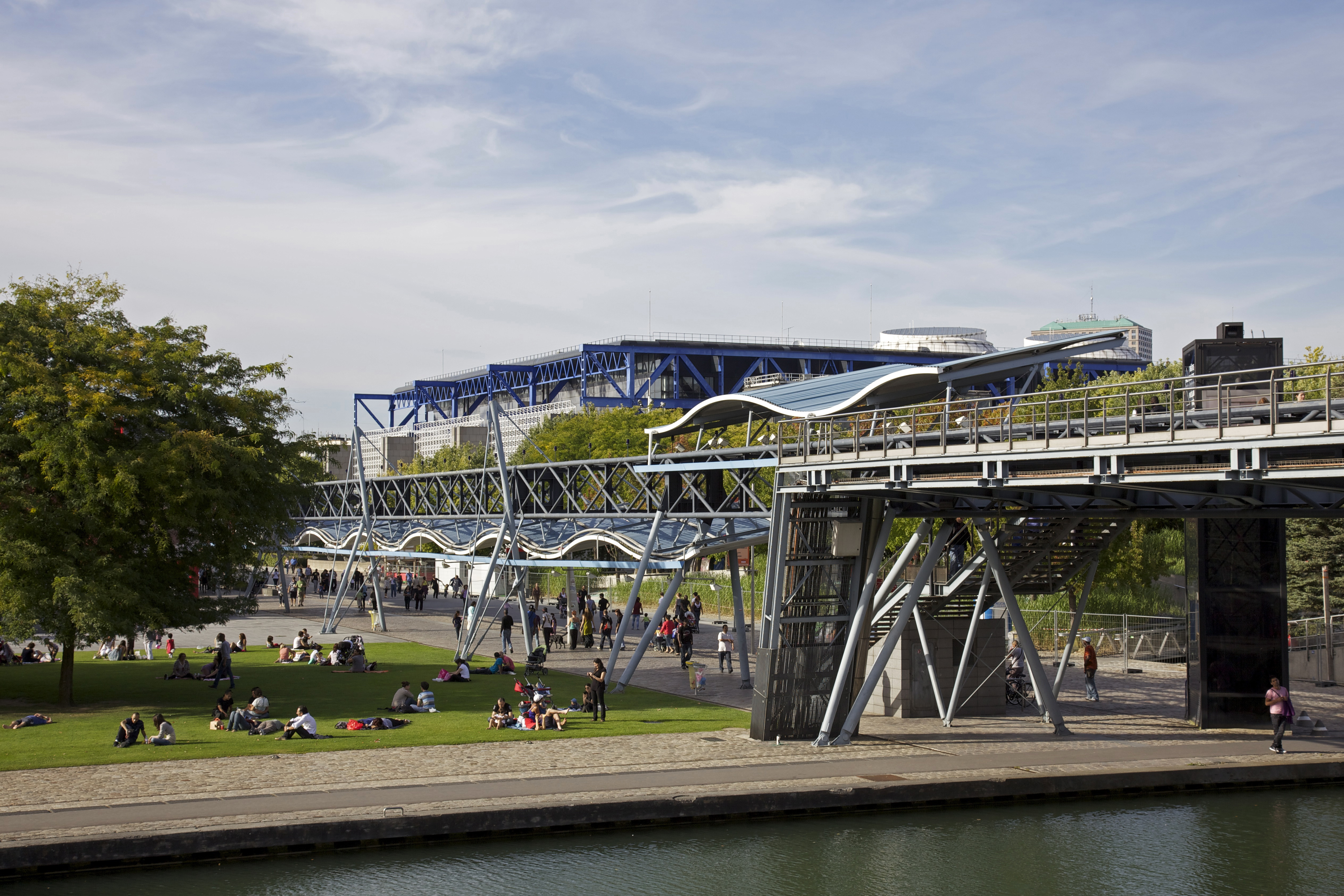
The Parc de la Villette (19th arrondissement)
- Parc André Citroën
- Parc de Bagatelle
- Parc de Belleville
- Parc de Bercy
- Parc Georges-Brassens
- Parc de la Butte-du-Chapeau-Rouge
- Parc des Buttes Chaumont
- Parc du Champ de Mars
- Parc de Choisy
- Parc floral de Paris
- Parc Kellermann
- Parc Monceau
- Parc Montsouris
- Parc Rives-de-Seine
- Parc de la Villette
- Parc Clichy Batignolles Martin Luther King

== Gardens ==
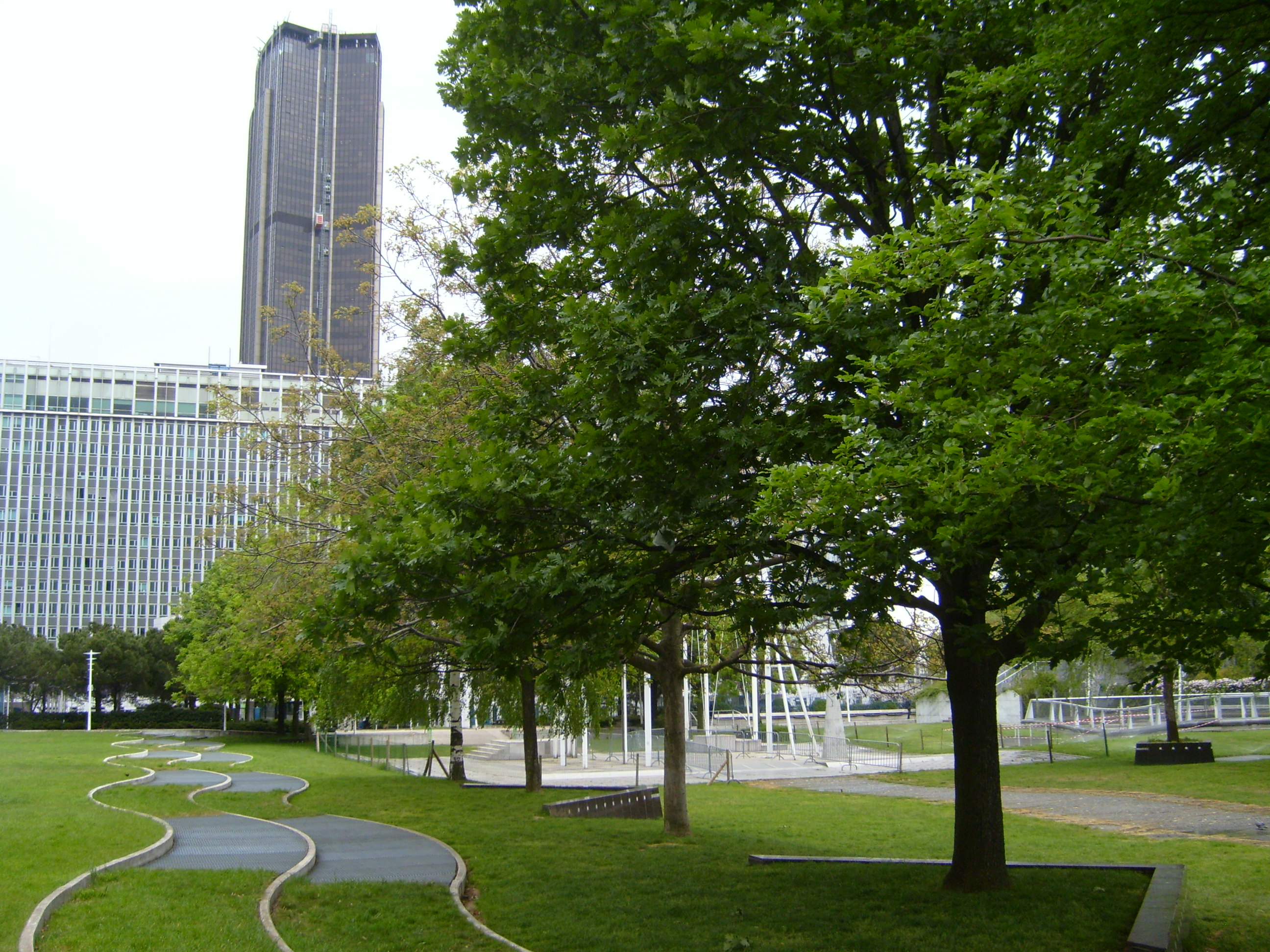
The Jardin Atlantique (15th arrondissement)

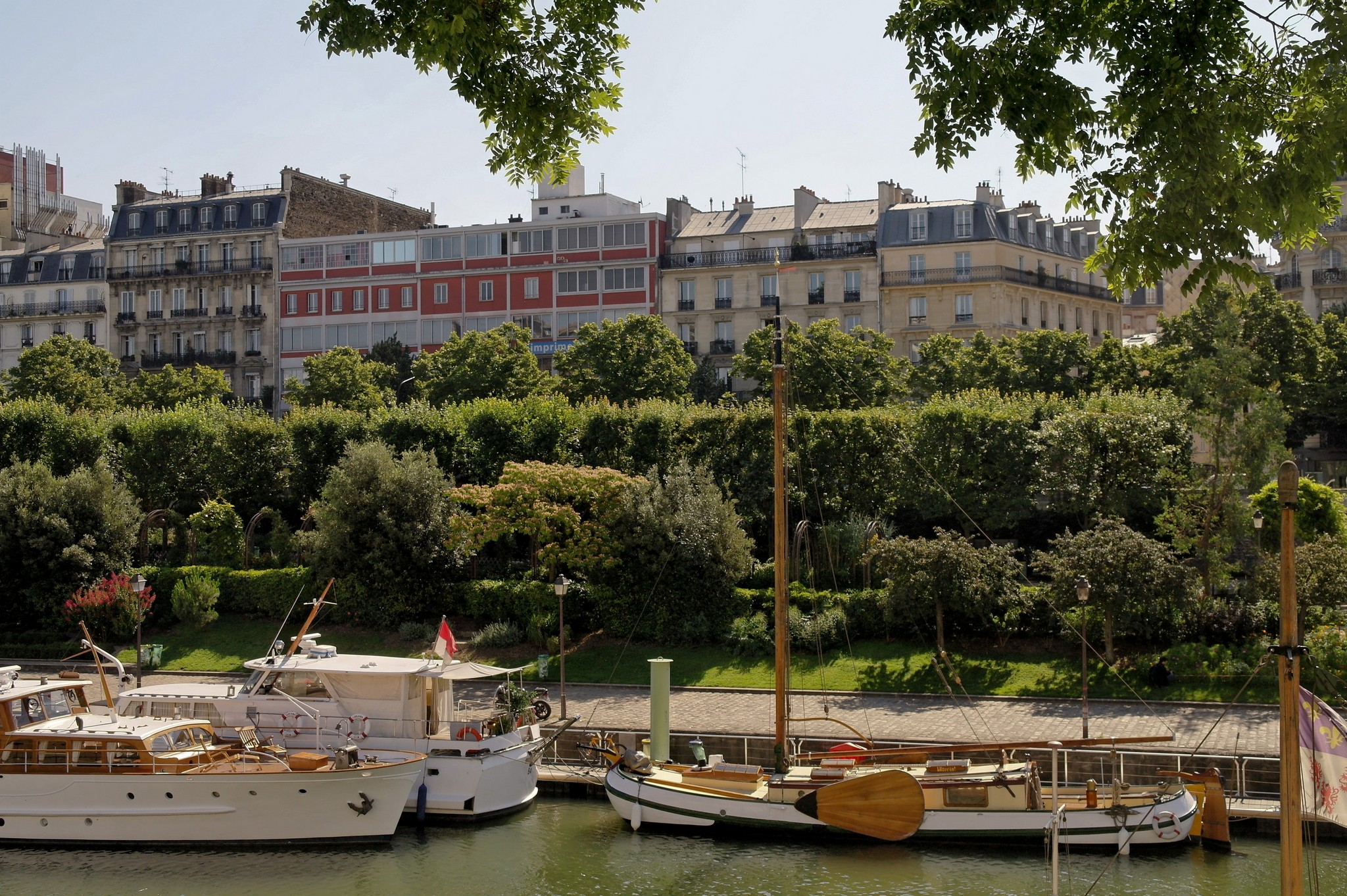
Jardin du Bassin de l'Arsenal (12th arrondissement)

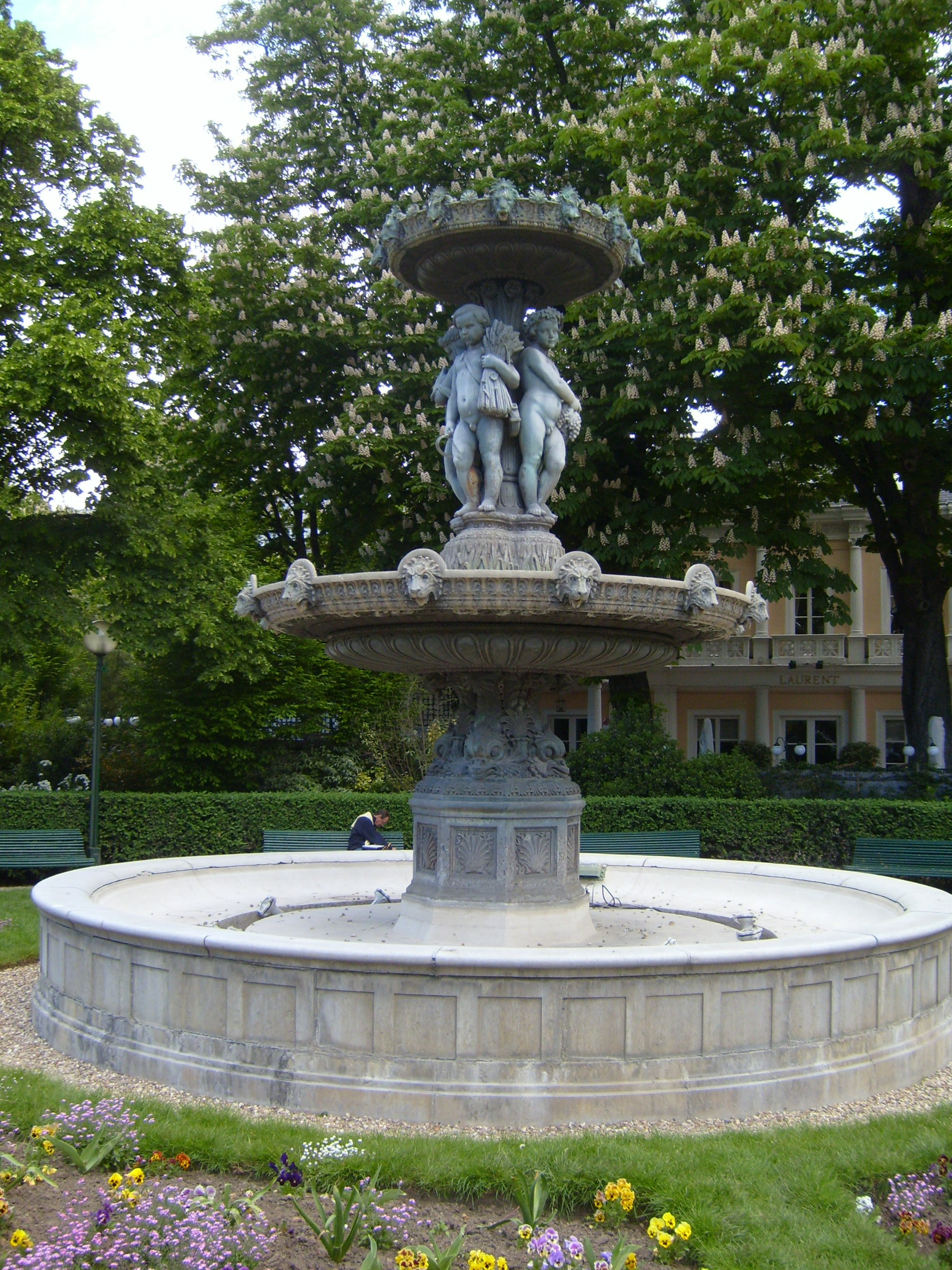
Jardin des Champs-Élysées (8th arrondissement)

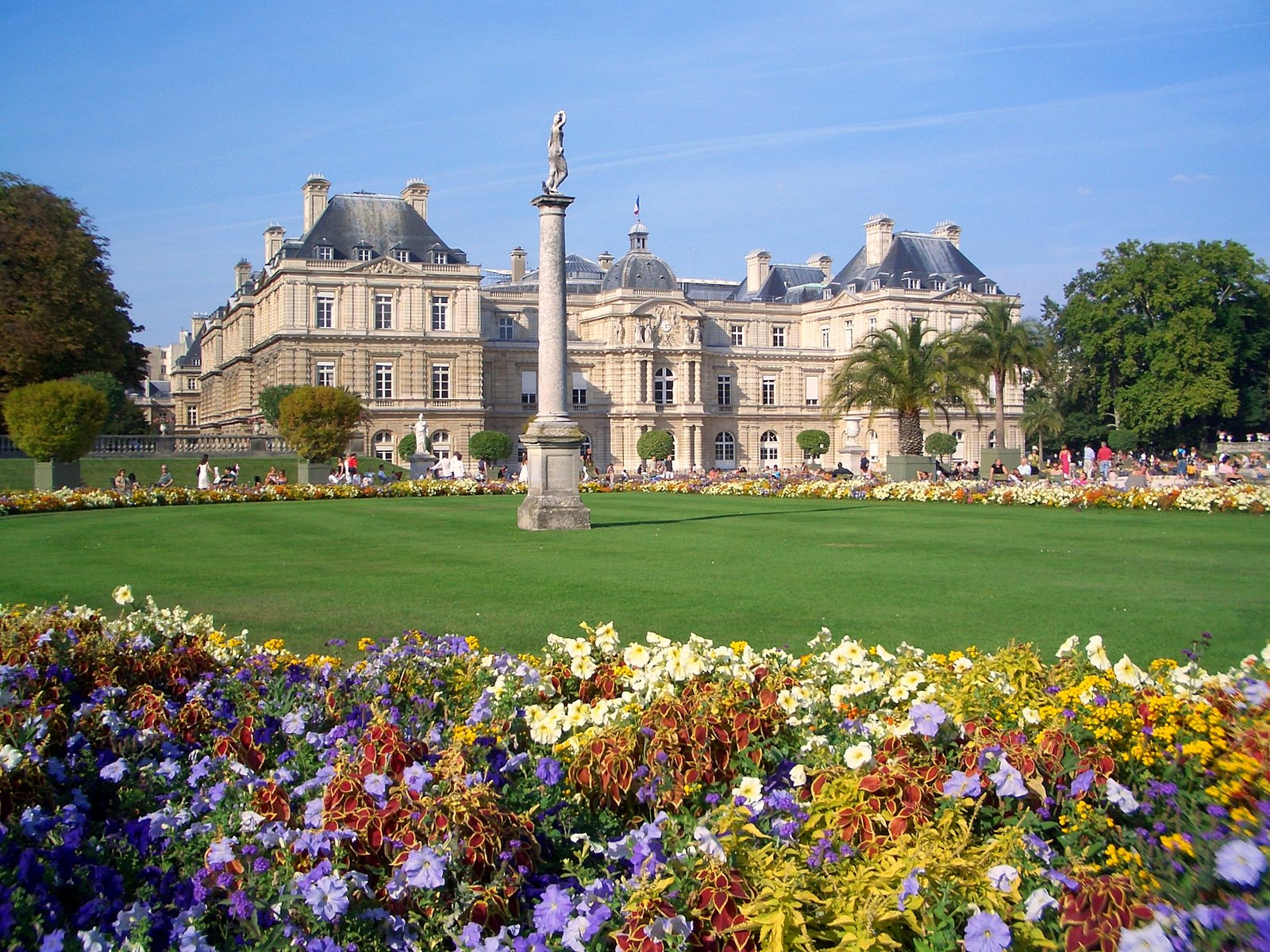
Jardin du Luxembourg (6th arrondissement)

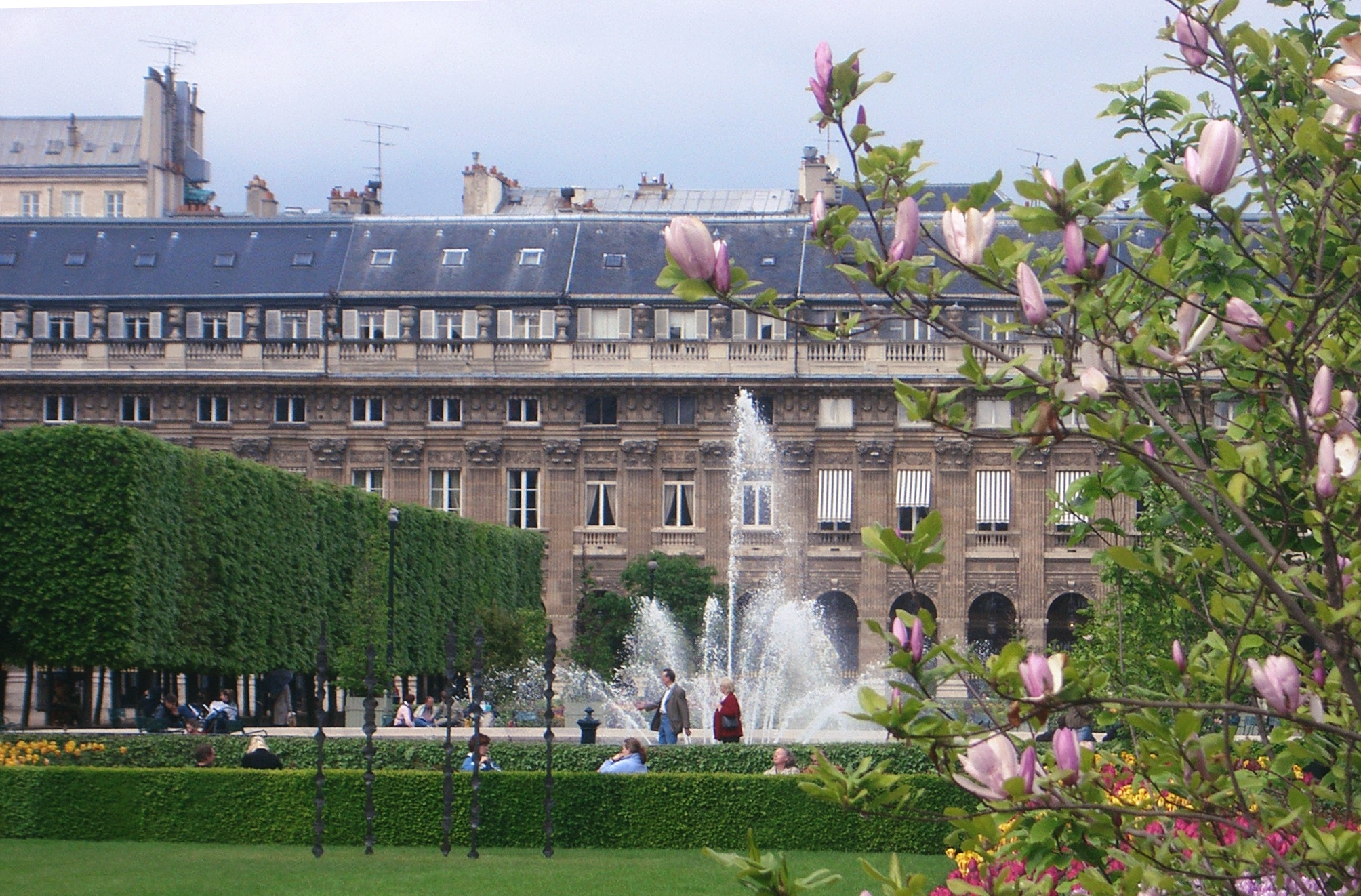
The Jardins du Palais Royal (1st arrondissement)

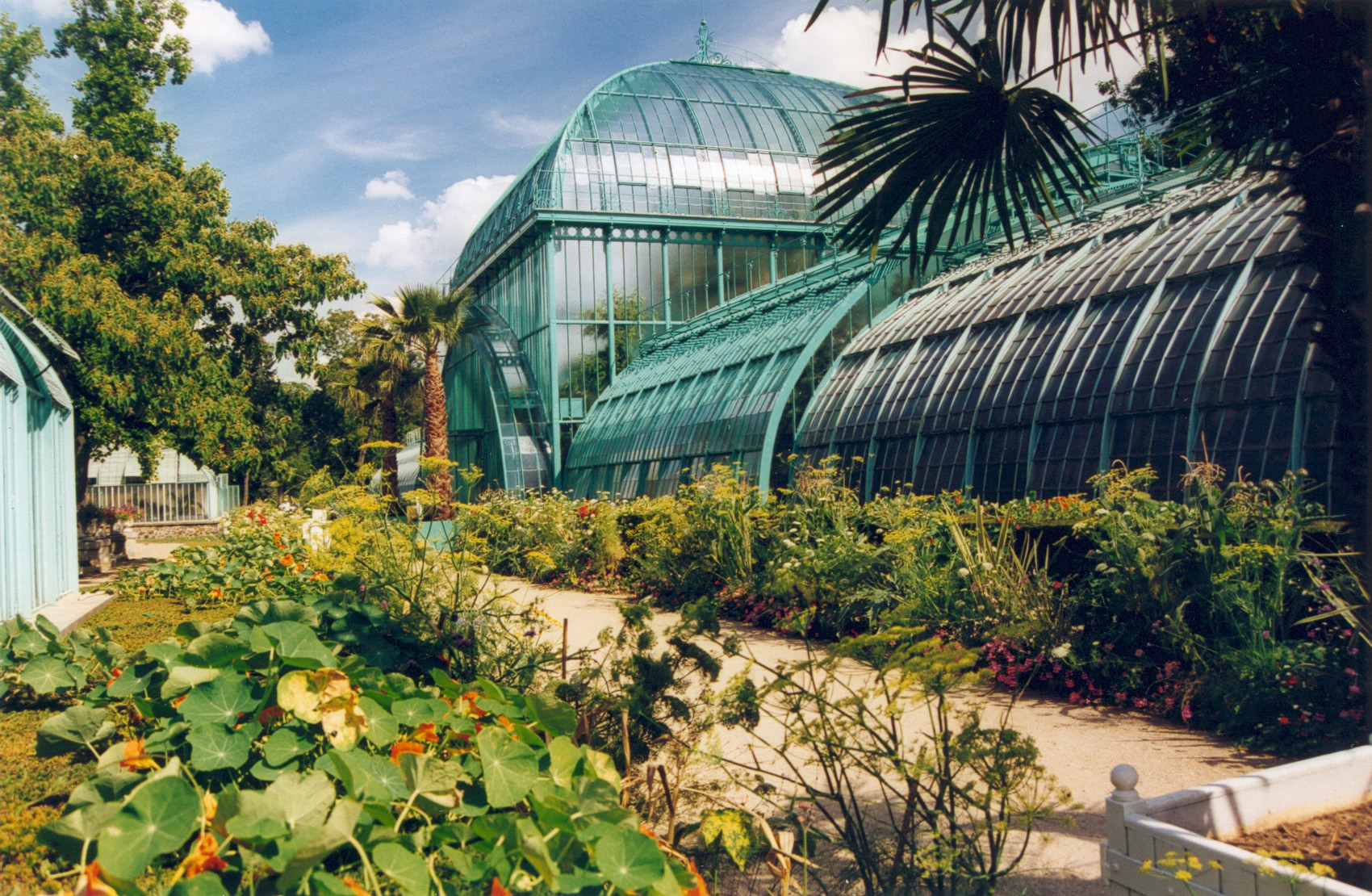
Jardin des Serres d'Auteuil (16th arrondissement)

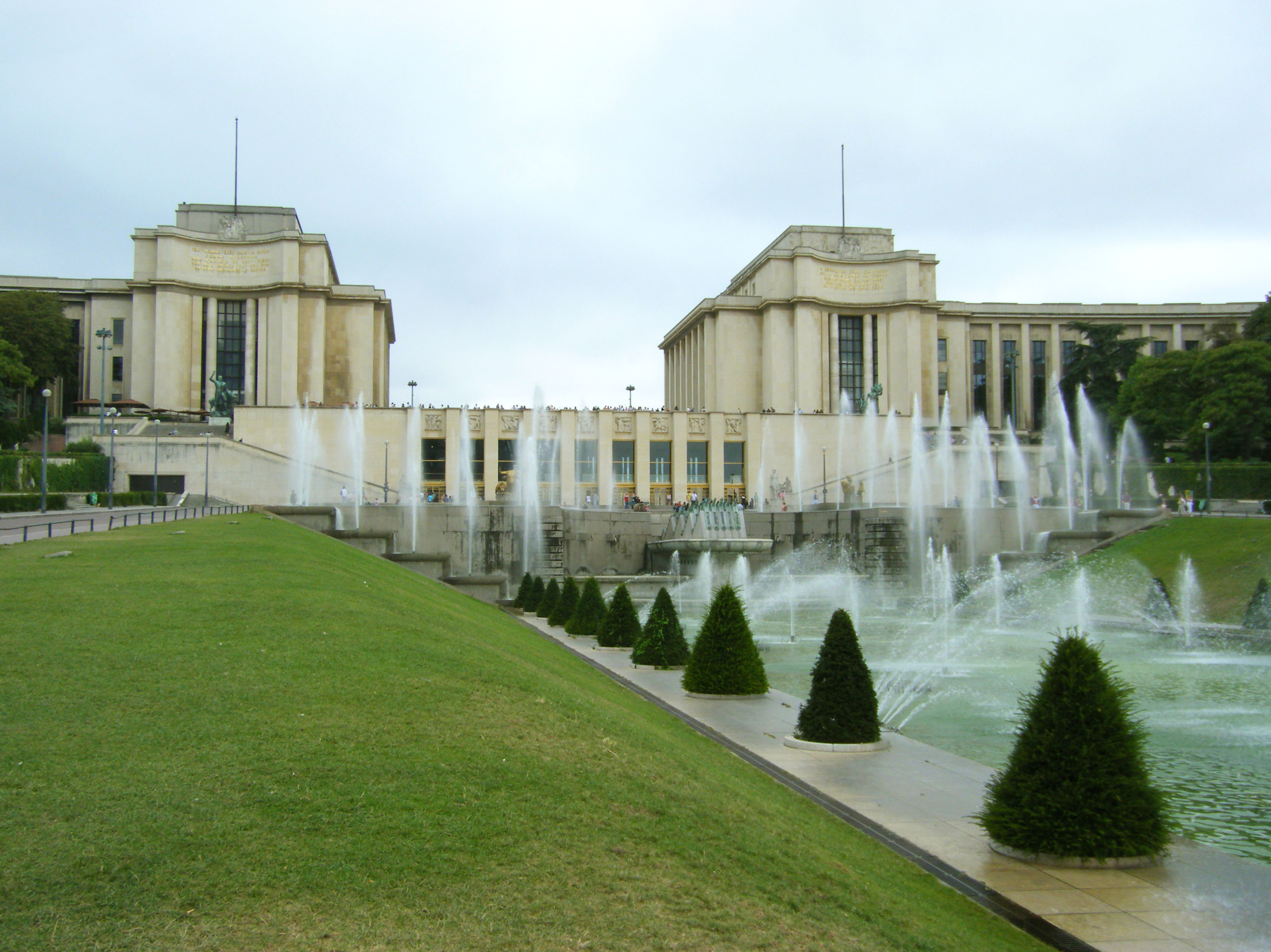
Jardins du Trocadéro (16th arrondissement)

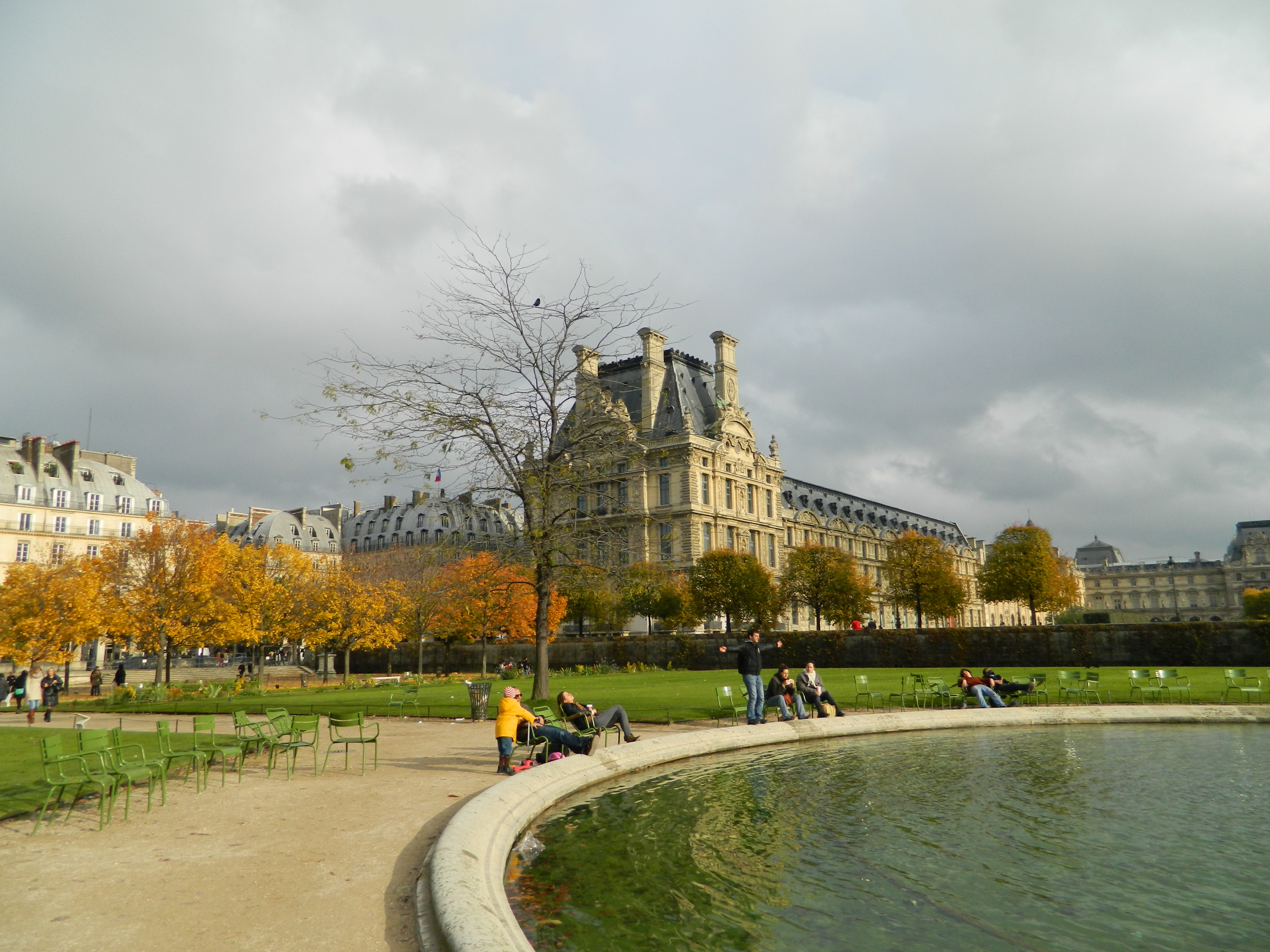
The Tuileries Gardens (1st arrondissement)

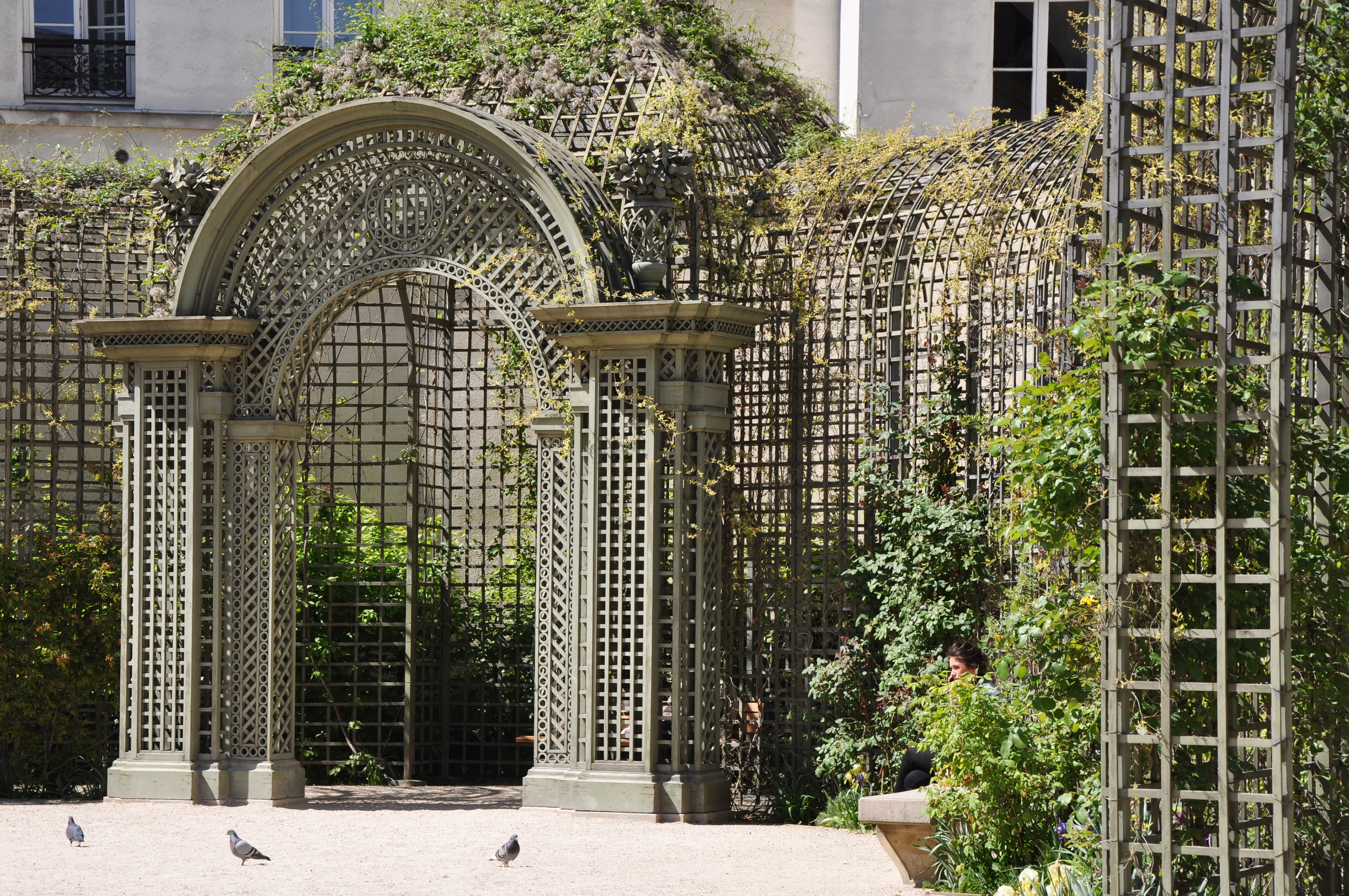
Jardin Anne-Frank (3rd arrondissement)
- Jardin d'Acclimatation
- Jardin du Bassin de l'Arsenal
- Jardin Atlantique
- Jardin Pré Catelan
- Jardin Catherine-Labouré
- Jardin des Champs-Élysées
- Jardin des Halles
- Luxembourg Garden (Jardin du Luxembourg)
- Jardin naturel
- Palais Royal Garden (Jardin du Palais Royal)
- Jardin des Plantes
- Jardin du Ranelagh
- Jardin des Serres d'Auteuil
- Parc Aretha-Franklin
- Jardin Tino-Rossi
- Jardins du Trocadéro
- Tuileries Garden (Jardin des Tuileries)
- Jardin Villemin Masha Jina Amini
- Jardins des Rosiers Joseph Migneret
- Jardin de Reuilly - Paul Pernin

== Promenades ==
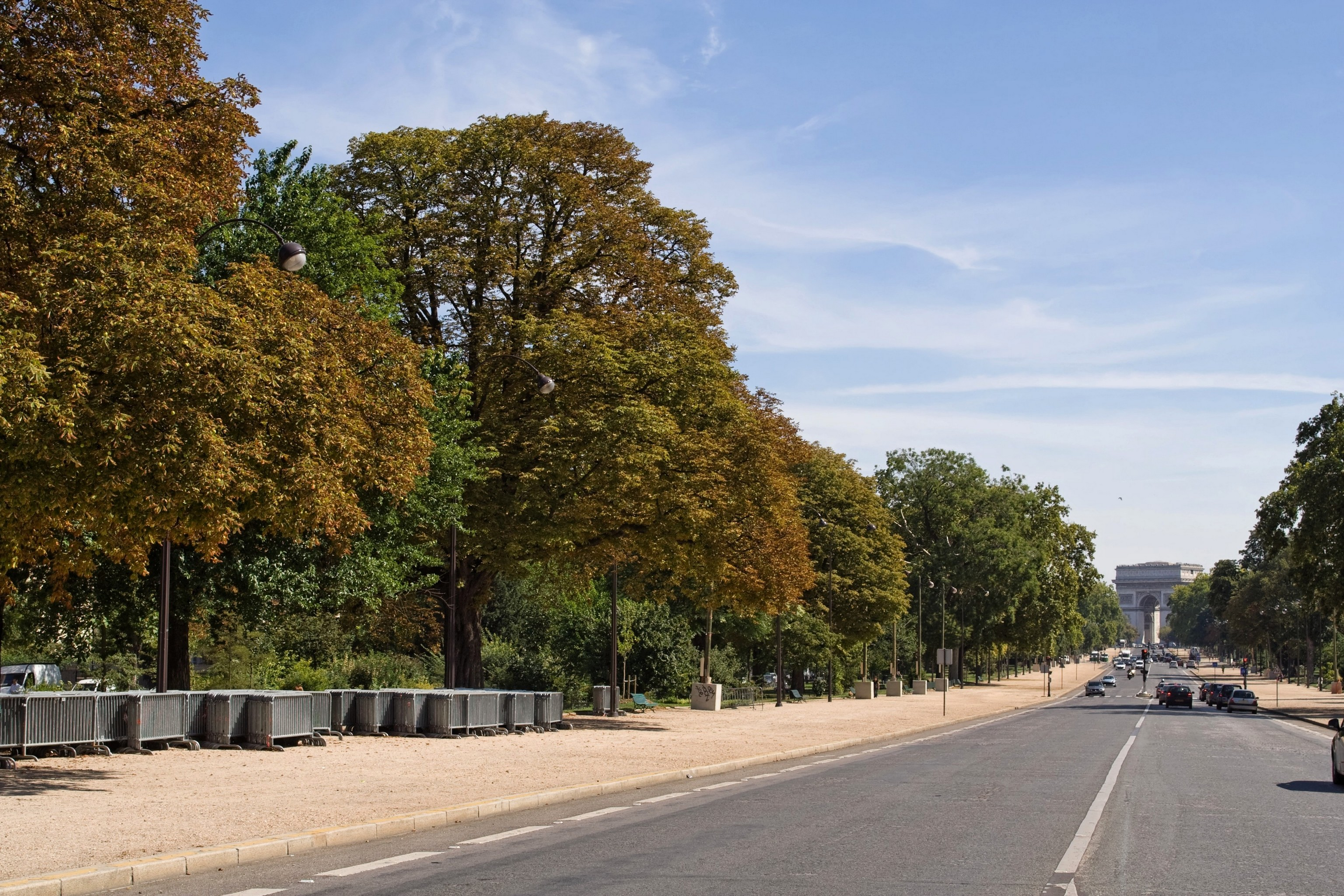
Gardens of Avenue Foch (16th arrondissement)

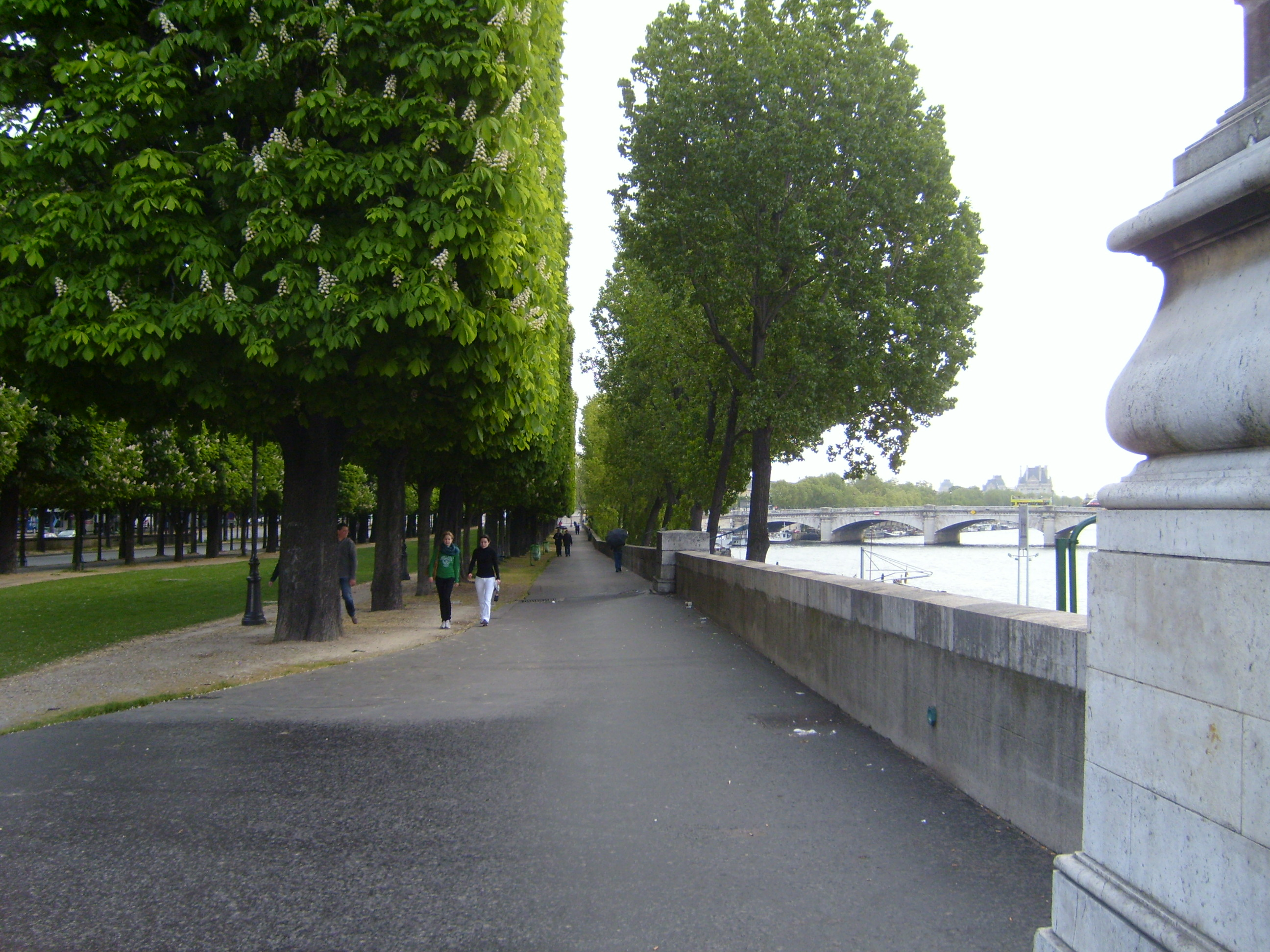
Cours-la-Reine (8th arrondissement)

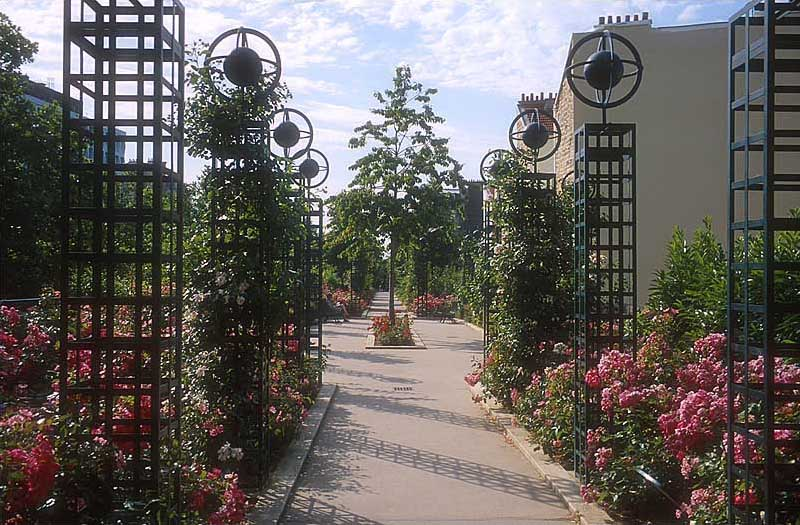
The Promenade plantée (12th arrondissement)

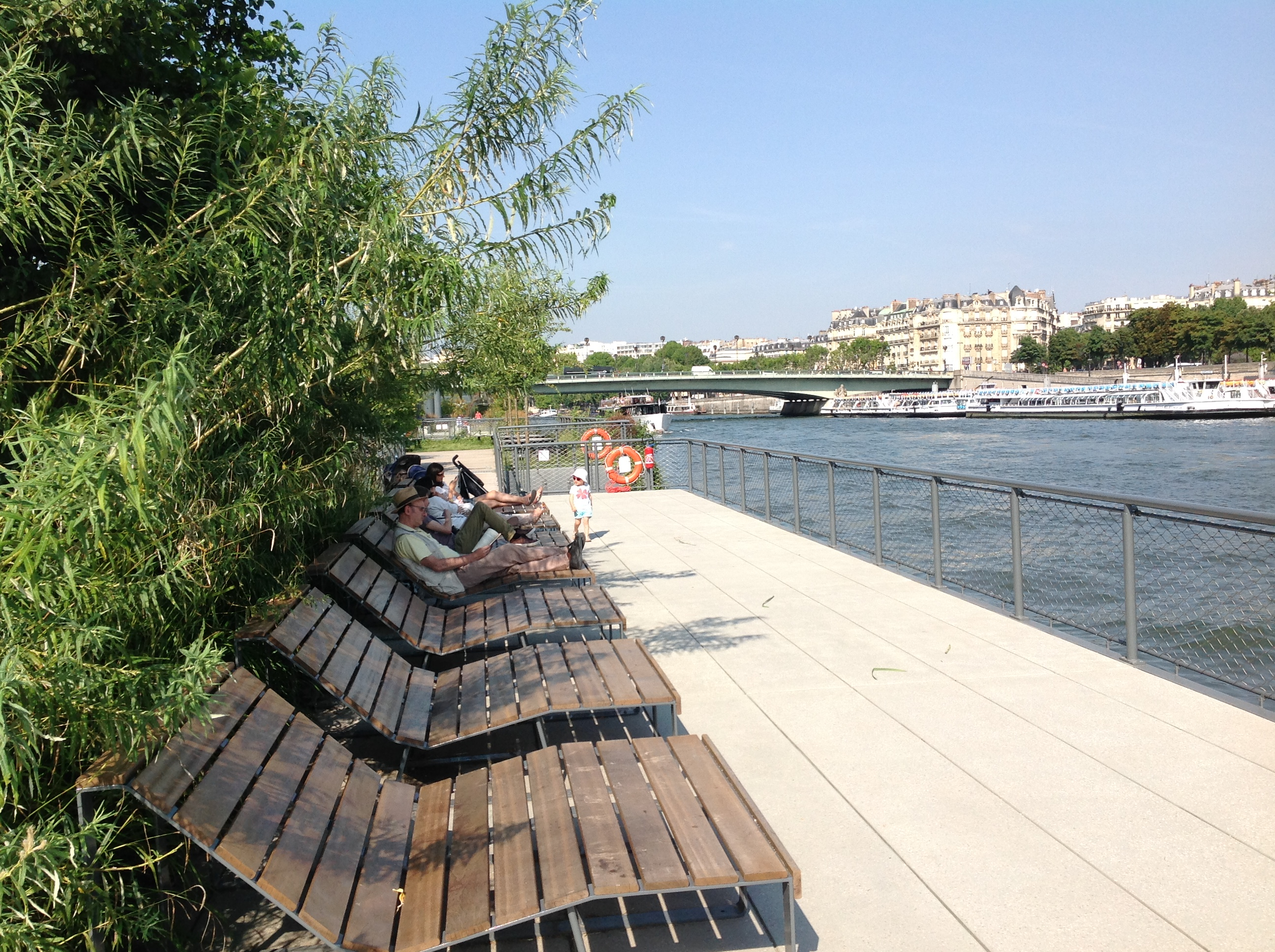
Promenade des Berges de la Seine (7th arrondissement)
- Gardens of Avenue Foch
- Promenade plantée
- Île aux Cygnes
- Promenade des Berges de la Seine
- Cours-la-Reine
