= Parc de la Butte-du-Chapeau-Rouge =

Public park in Paris, France

Coordinates: 48°52′54″N 2°23′56″E

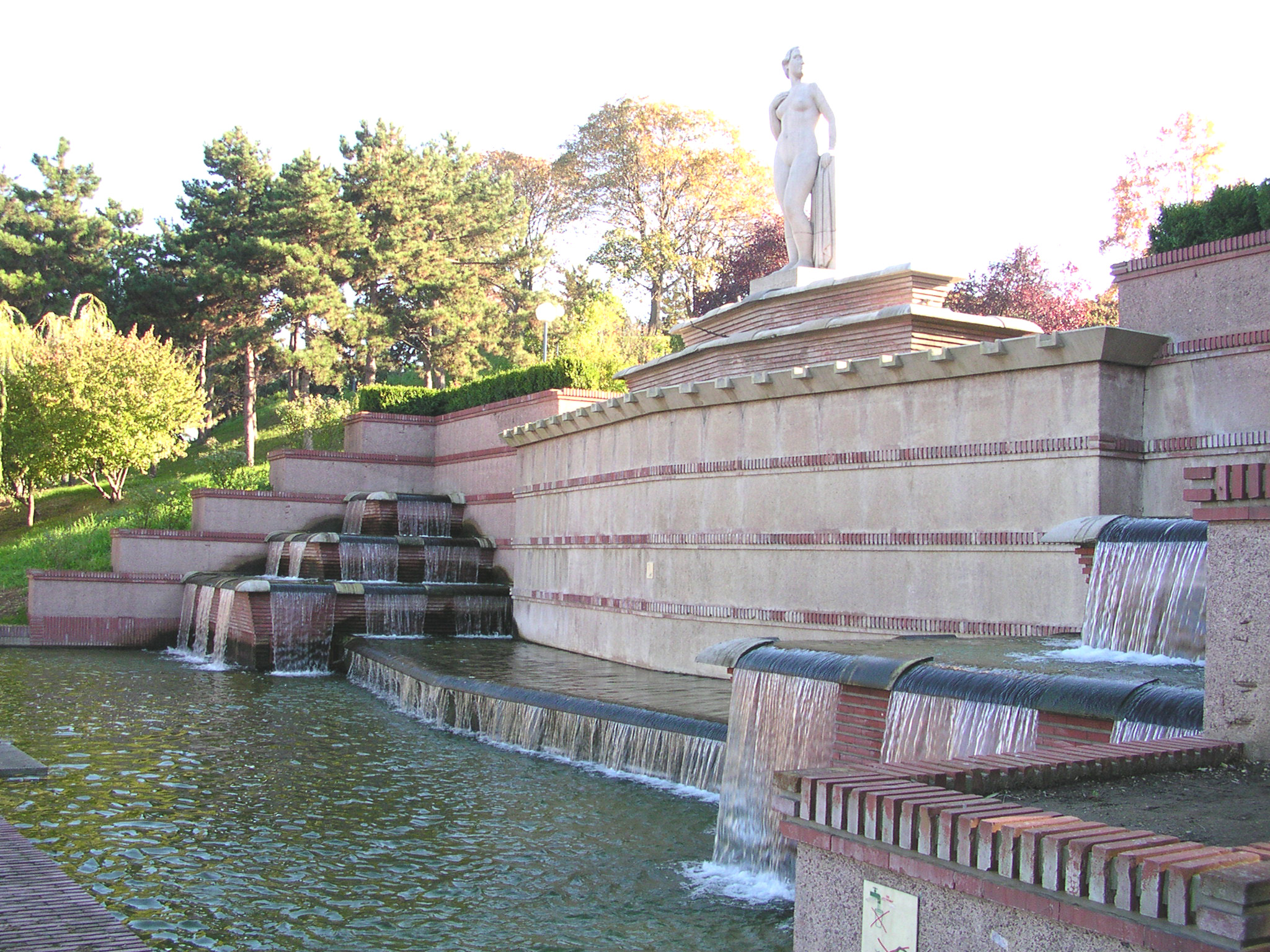
The buffet-d'eau of the Parc de la Butte-du-Chapeau-Rouge (1938)

The Parc de la Butte-du-Chapeau-Rouge formerly known as the Square de la Butte-du-Chapeau-Rouge, is a public park in the 19th arrondissement of Paris, created in 1939. It is an example of 1930s modernist park design, and contains a fountain and works of sculpture from the Exposition Internationale des Arts et Techniques dans la Vie Moderne held at the Trocadéro in 1937.

The park is located between the Boulevard d'Algérie, Boulevard Sérurier, and Avenue Debidour. The nearest Metro station is Pré-Saint-Gervais.

== History ==
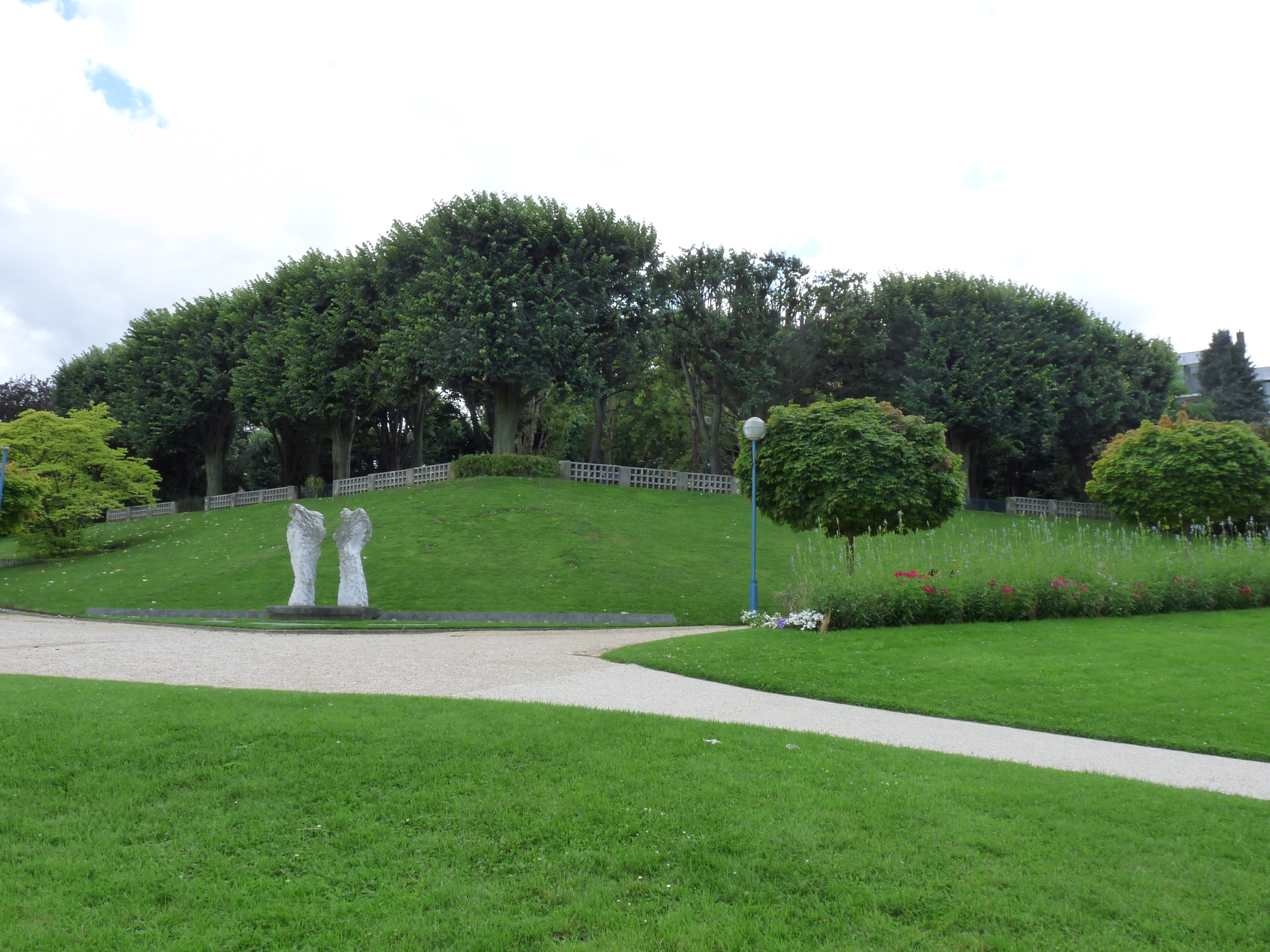
Paths climb the hillside of the Parc de la Butte-du-Chapeau-Rouge.

The park was built on a wide strip of land around the edge of the city which had been set aside as a military zone in the 1840s. Some Paris architects and planners had called for transforming the entire zone around the city into a continuous park, but that plan was abandoned and only a small amount of the zone was dedicated to green space.

The new park was designed by the architect Léon Azéma, a classically trained architect who had won the Prix de Rome in 1921, along with his colleagues Jacques Carlu and Louis-Hippolyte Boileau, who had all worked together on the hillside and fountains of Palais de Chaillot for the Exposition Internationale des Arts et Techniques dans la Vie Moderne (1937).

The park marked a major departure for the garden designs of Paris. Since 1855, all the new parks and gardens of Paris had been designed or re-designed by Jean-Charles Adolphe Alphand, the first chief of Paris Promenades and Plantations under Emperor Napoleon III from 1855 until 1870, and then Director of Public Works of Paris from 1871 until his death in 1891, or by the pupils of Alphand, and they all followed the same basic picturesque style, with groves of trees, flowerbeds, winding paths, kiosks, and follies. Azéma's style was more classical, with wide open lawns highlighting works of sculpture, and the groves of trees serving mainly as a background. He used the park to showcase several works of modern sculpture.

== Features of the park ==
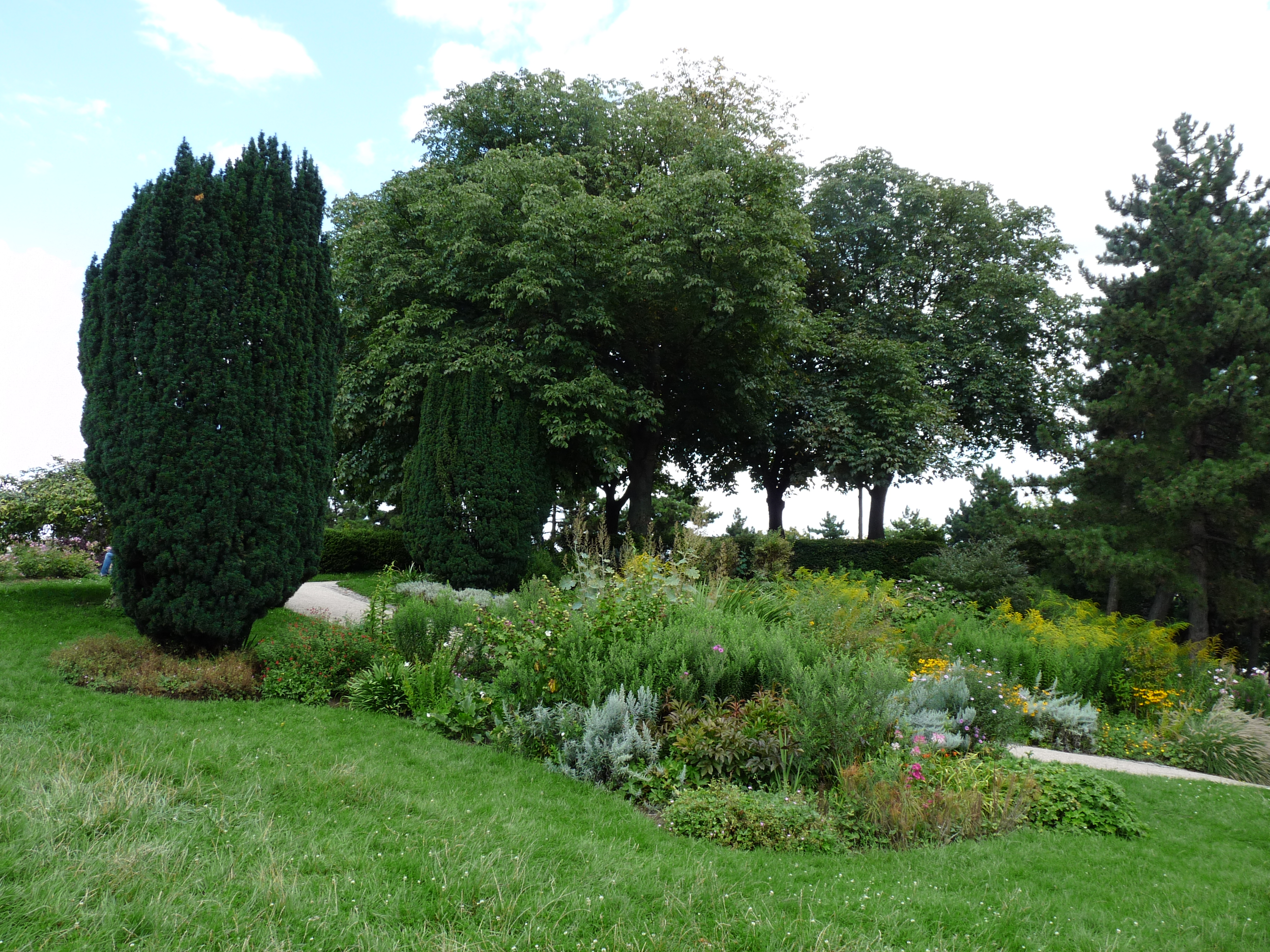
Grove of trees in the Parc de la Butte-du-Chapeau-Rouge

The park has an area of 4.68 hectares and is built on a hillside, which offers a fine view of the city from the top. The moderne-style buffet d'eau at the entrance on Boulevard d'Algérie, on the lower end of the park, has a statue of Eve (1938) which had been displayed at the 1937 exposition, by Raymond Couvégne, a winner of the prix de Rome.

Two stairways and two long alleys climb the hillside from the entrance, on either side of a large lawn, and two spiral paths lead up to two belvederes, surrounded by groves of trees, which offer views of the city. Other paths lead to a terrace higher in the park, which also offers a panoramic view. A group of three statues (two women and a child with grapes) by Pierre Traverse (1938) decorates the hillside lawns, in the fashion of statues in the classical gardens of the 18th century. The park also has two large playgrounds, one with neo-classical columns. The architecture in the park is in the decorative style of the 1930s, using bricks combined with cement encrusted with pebbles.

== See also ==
- 19th arrondissement of Paris
- History of Parks and Gardens of Paris
- List of parks and gardens in Paris
