= Jardin Tino-Rossi =

Garden in Paris, France

Coordinates: 48°50′50.418″N 2°21′40.126″E

The Jardin Tino-Rossi is a green space complex located in the 5th arrondissement of Paris.

== Location and origin of the name ==
The complex is named after Constantin “Tino” Rossi (1907–1983) and is located along the Quai Saint-Bernard on the banks of the Seine between the Pont d'Austerlitz and Pont de Sully bridges.

== History ==
The garden was planned in 1970 after the project to build a highway along the riverbank was abandoned. Architect Daniel Badani was commissioned to design it. It opened in 1980. When the Batobus service was founded in 1989, a station was also established here.

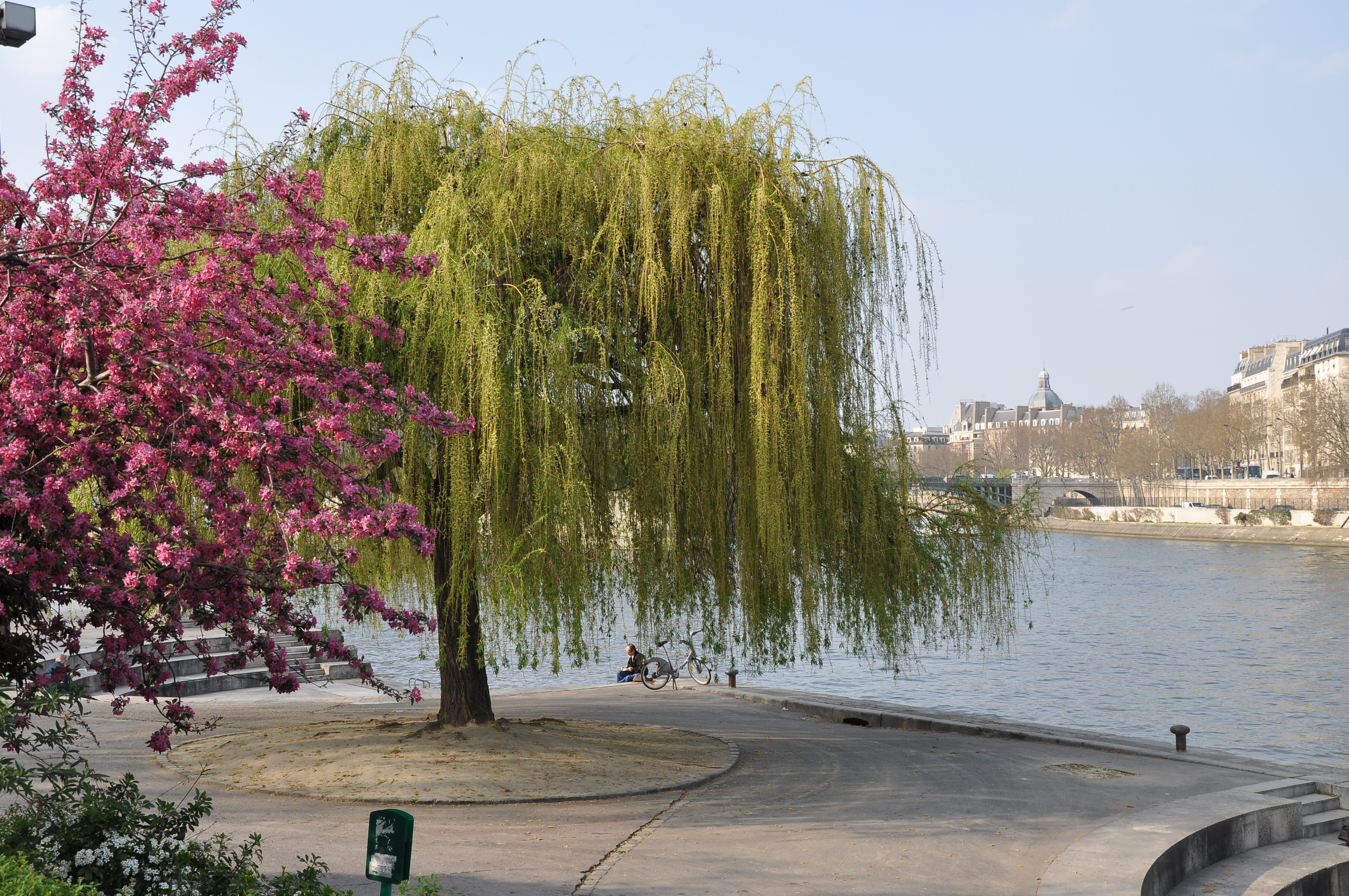
Jardin Tino Rossi

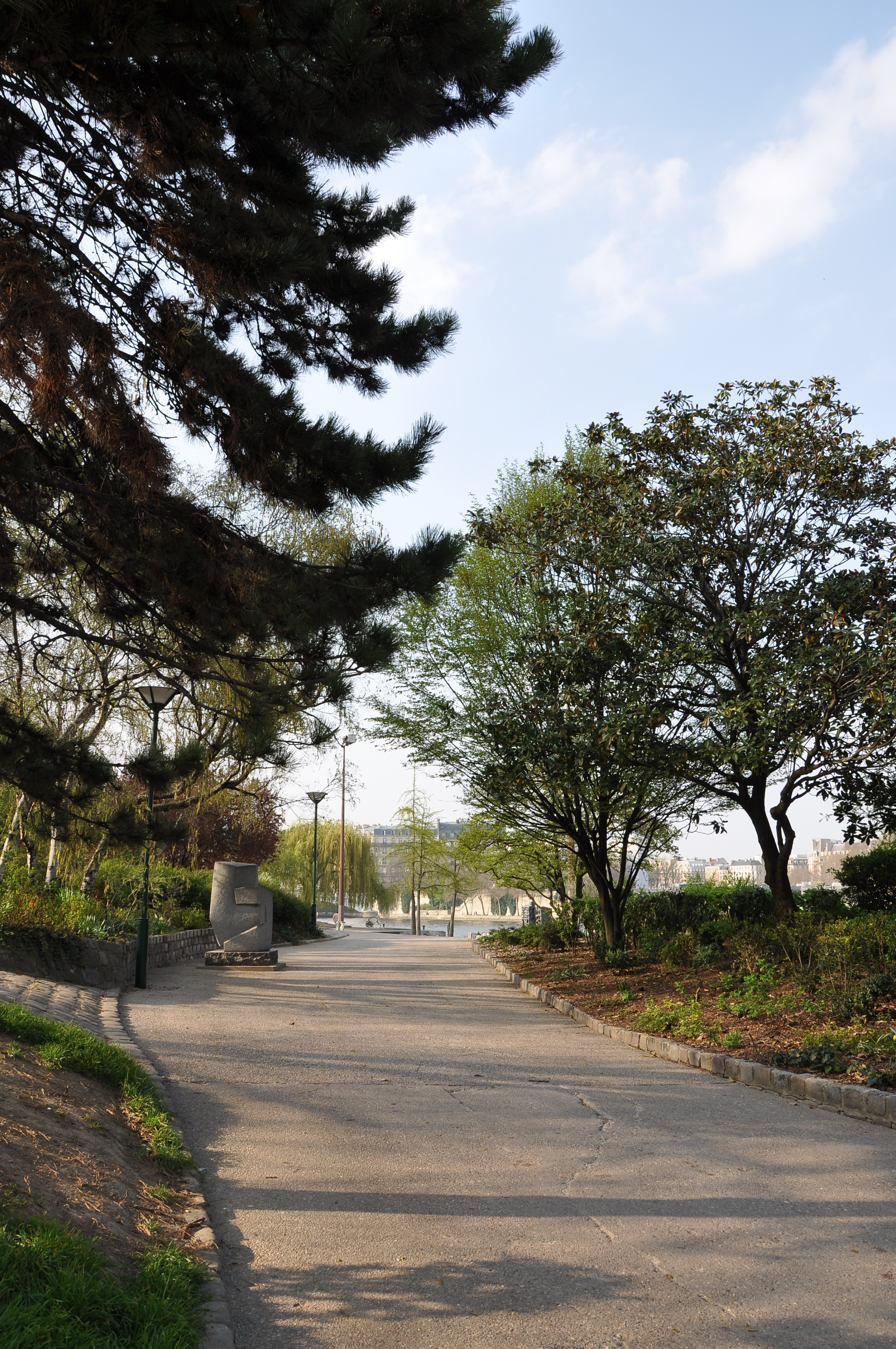
Pedestrian and cycle path in the complex

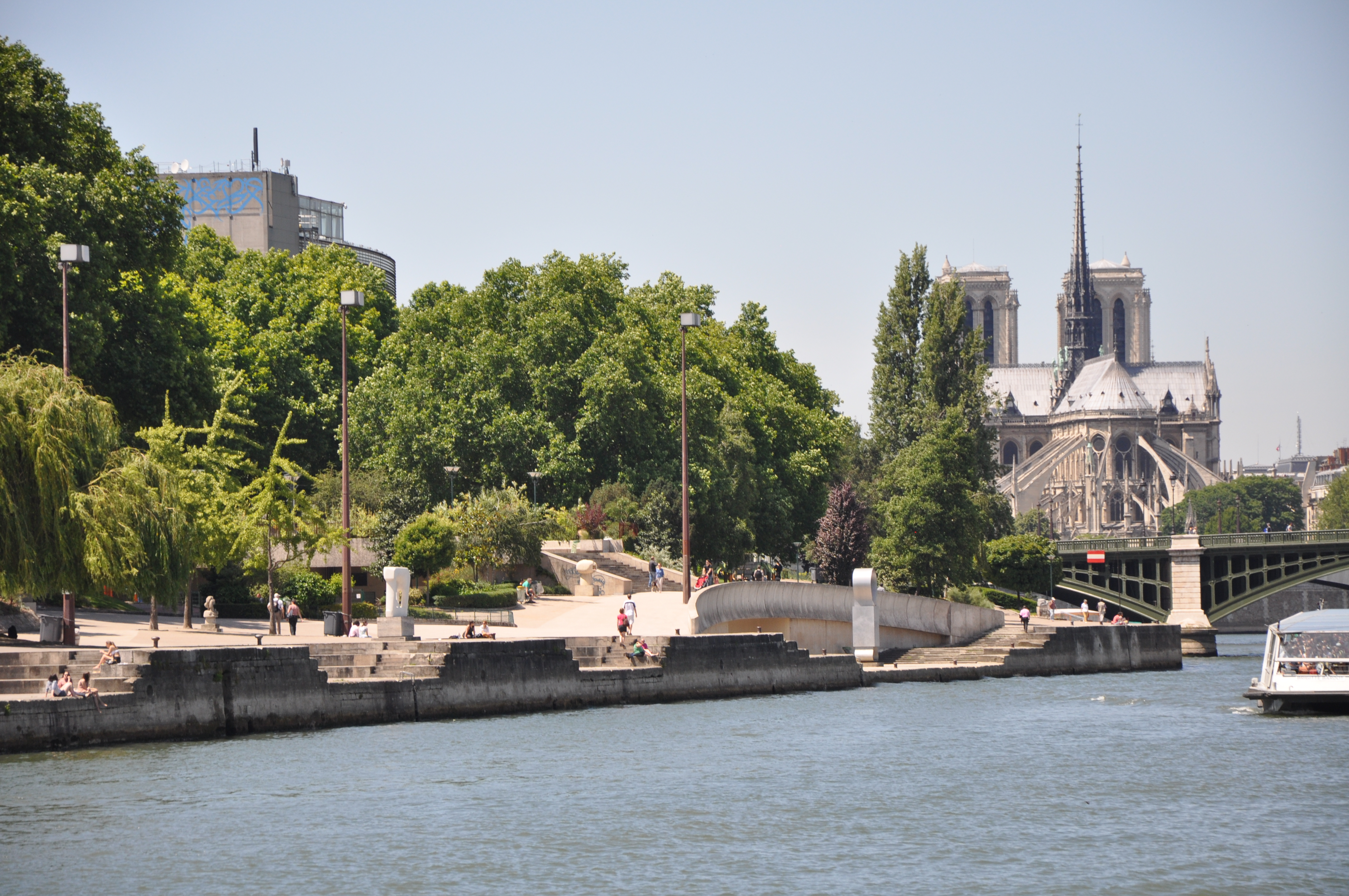
The Garden on the Seine with Notre Dame

== Special features ==
Because the park contains a sculpture garden, it is listed in the directory of the Musées de la ville de Paris. Musical and cultural events also take place in the park.

== External link ==
- Jardin Tino Rossi
