= Jardin Catherine-Labouré =

Urban park in Paris, France

Coordinates: 48°51′06″N 2°19′13″E

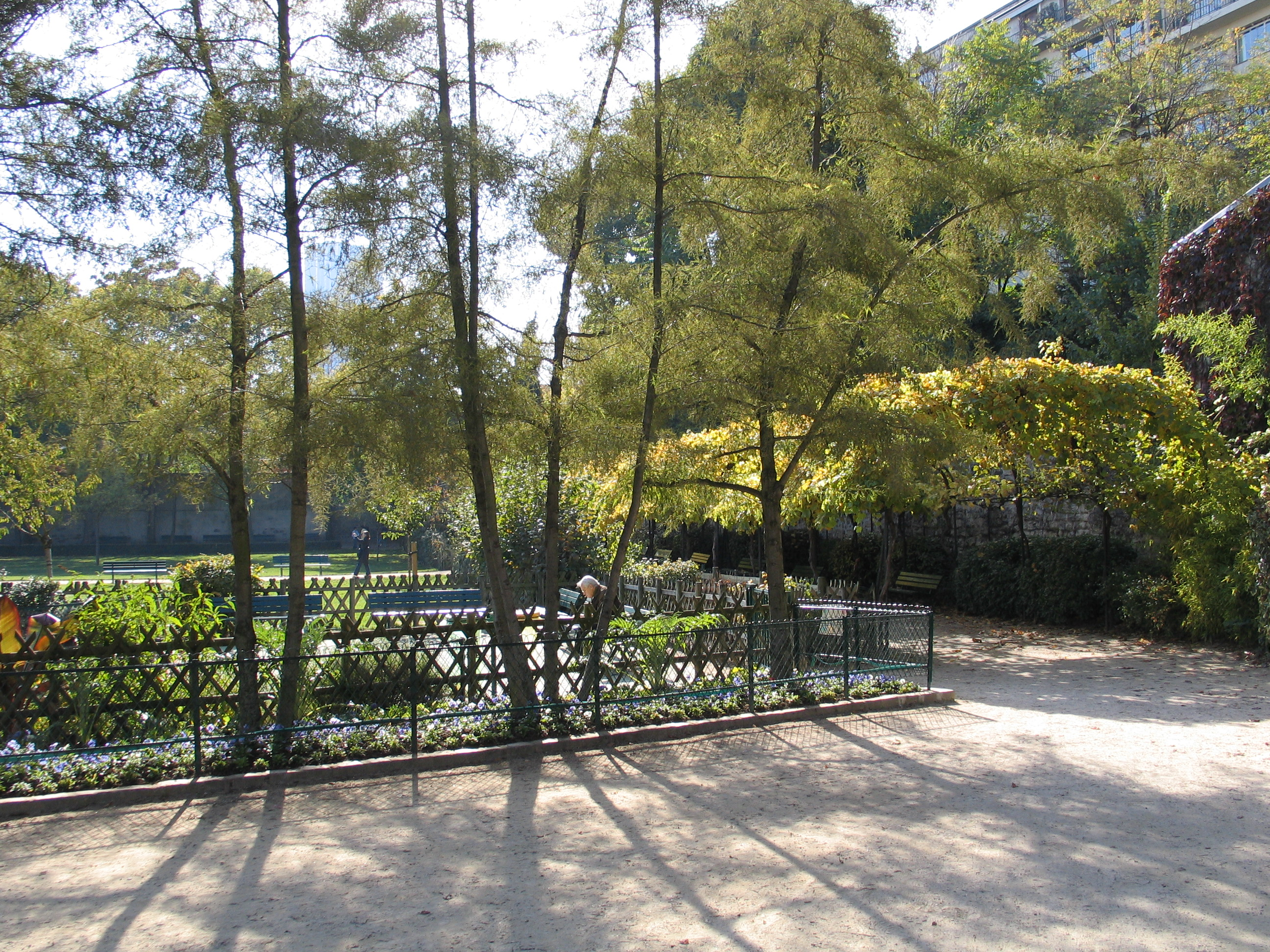
Jardin Catherine-Labouré in October

The Jardin Catherine-Labouré is a park of about 7,000 square metres in Paris's Seventh Arrondissement, on Rue Babylone. This garden with grapevines and ornamental berries was the potager of the convent of the Daughters of Charity since 1633 and has been open to the public since 1977. There is a community garden along with an arbor-covered pathway.
