= Jardin naturel Pierre-Emmanuel =

Garden in Paris, France

Coordinates: 48°51′31.752″N 2°23′31.752″E

The Jardin naturel Pierre-Emmanuel is a public park in the 20th arrondissement of Paris.

== Location and access ==
The garden is located close to Père Lachaise Cemetery and is accessible via 12 ter Rue de Lesseps or 120 Rue de la Réunion. The site is served by Metro Line 2 at the Alexandre Dumas station.

== Origin of the name ==
The garden pays tribute to Pierre Emmanuel (1916–1984), a French poet and writer and member of the Académie française, whose grave is located at Père-Lachaise.

== History ==
Created in 1995 following a competition won by landscape architects Agnès Bochet and Laurent Gérard, the square covers an area of 6,300 to 6,500 m².

This Parisian garden is unlike other public squares: much like the "wild garden" at the Jardin des Plantes, it is planted with wild flora typical of various natural habitats in the Île-de-France region, and its meadows are mown only two or three times a year; however, unlike its counterpart, it is open to the public daily without an appointment. It serves as a genuine biodiversity reserve, featuring a pond that is home to frogs, water lilies, and newts.

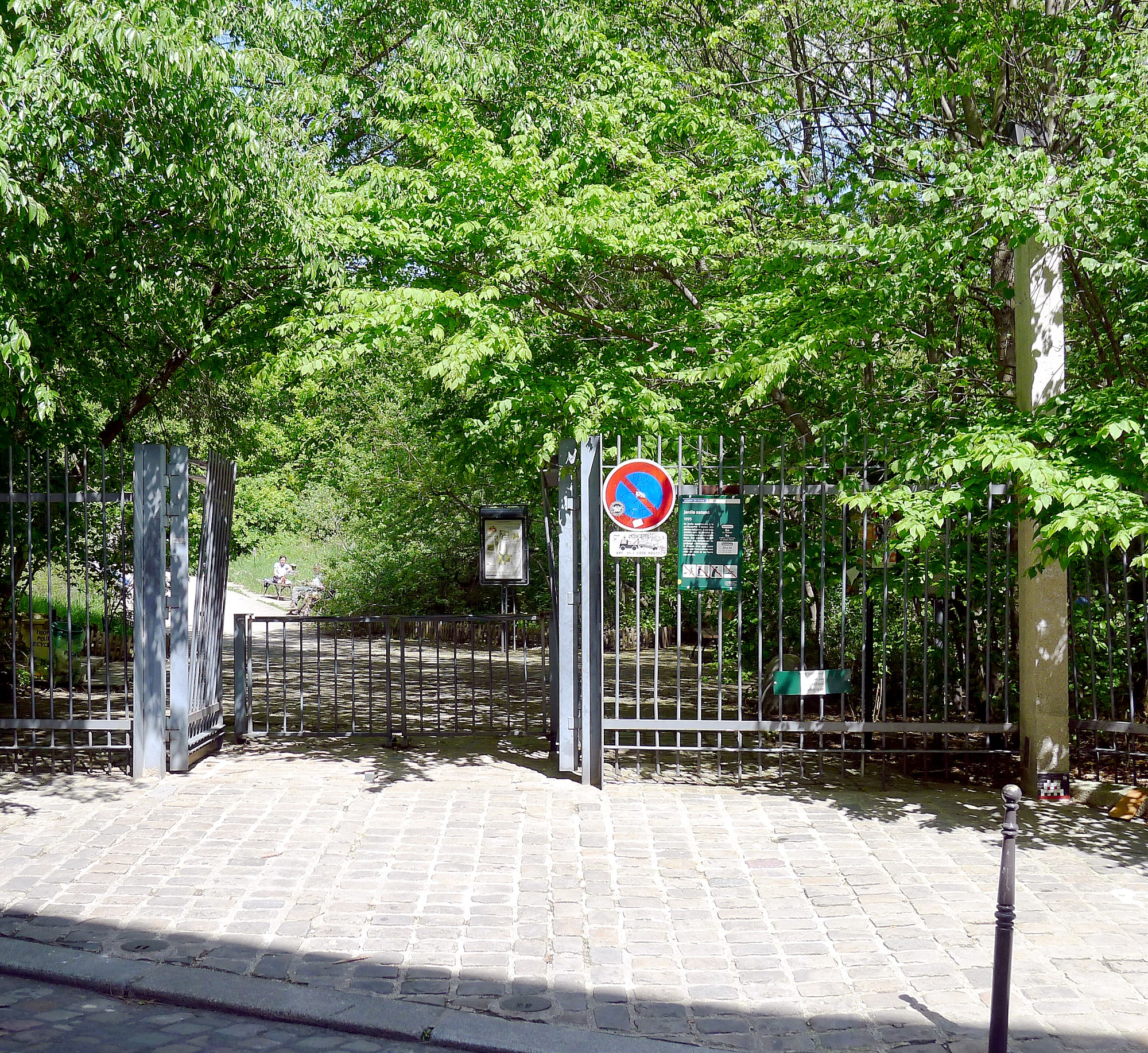
Garden entrance.

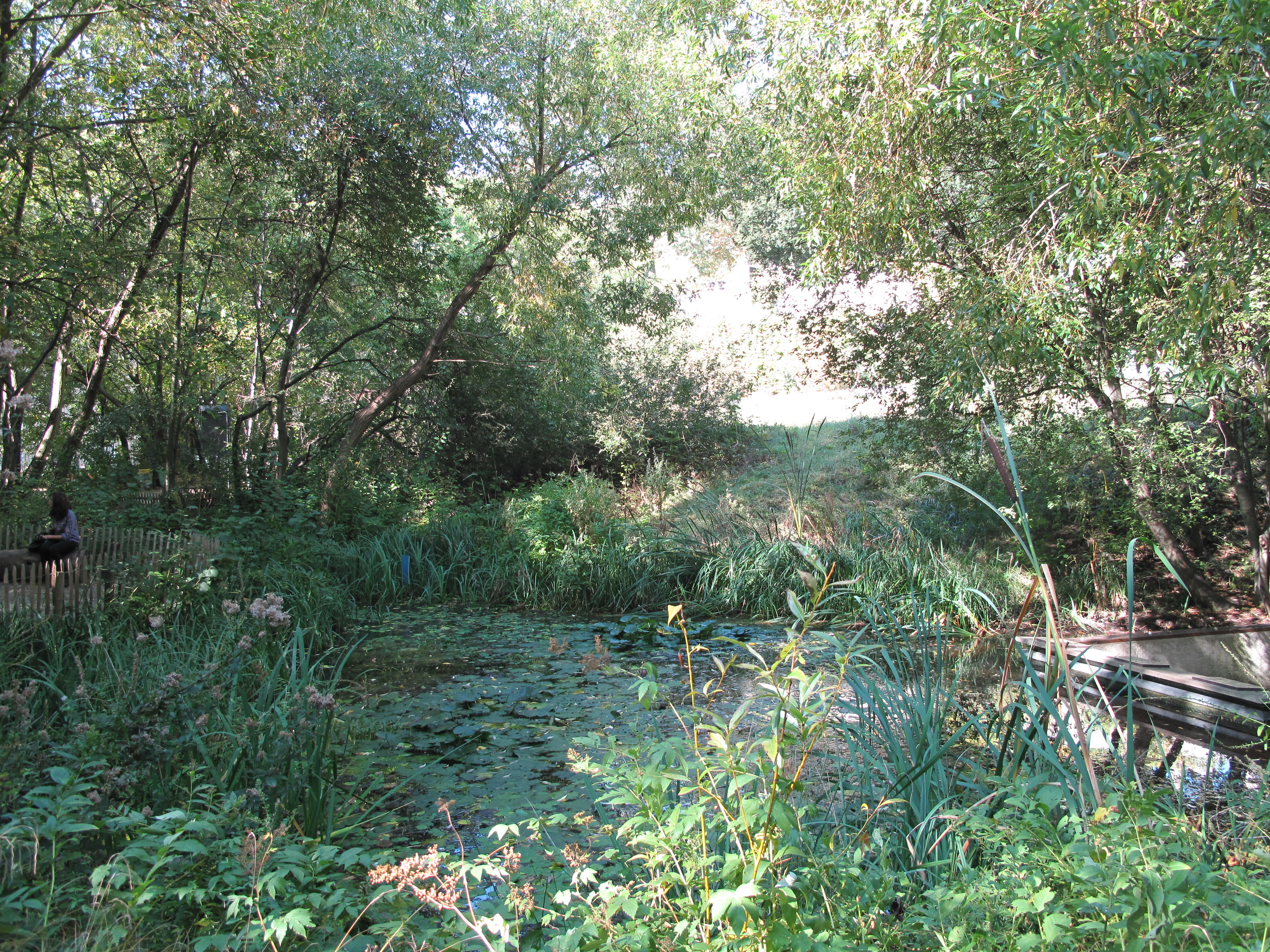
Pond.

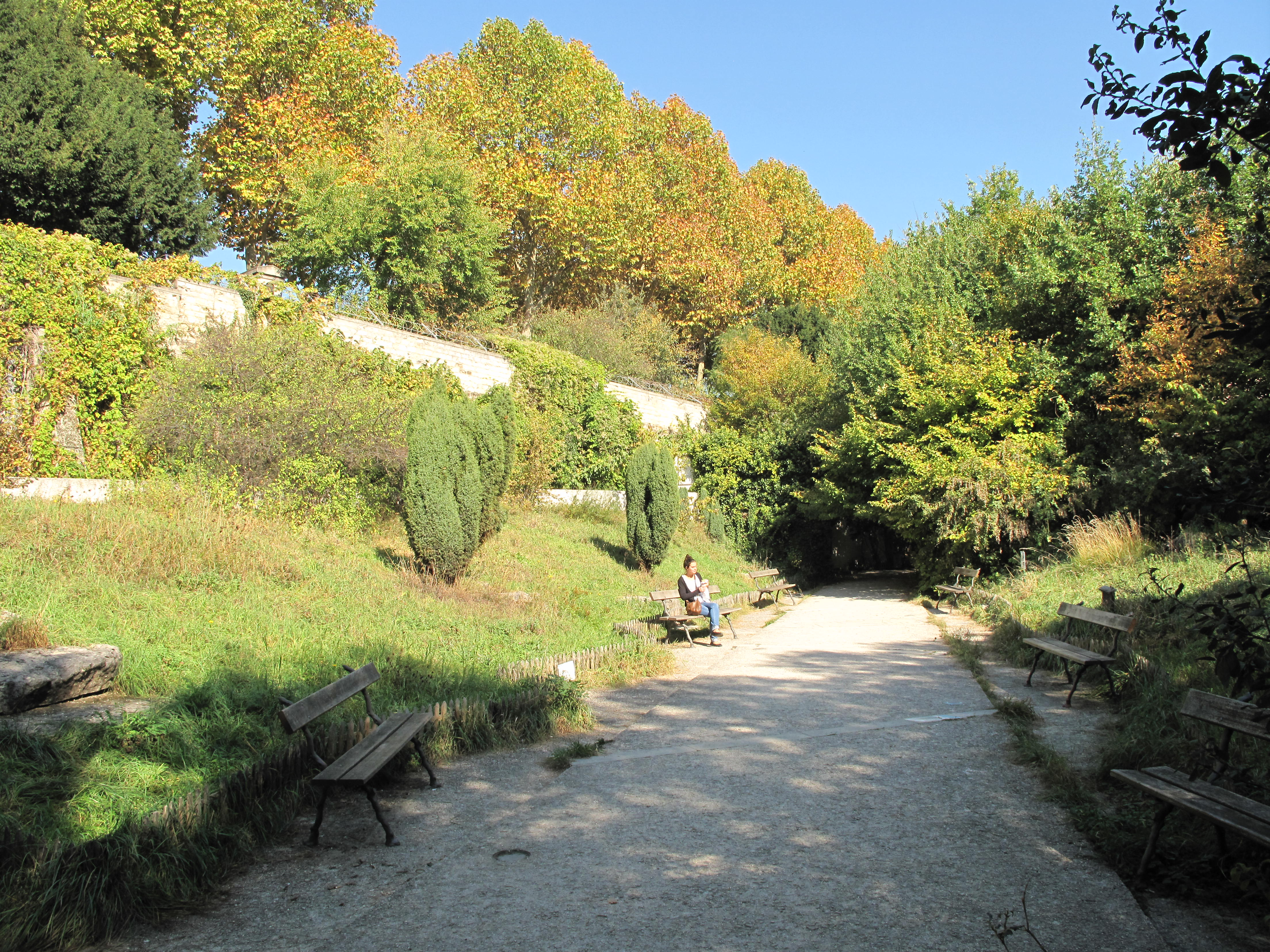
Aisle.
