= Quartier du Pont-de-Flandre =

Coordinates: 48.8948898°N 2.3884384°E

Pont-de-Flandre
- Quartier du Pont-de-Flandre
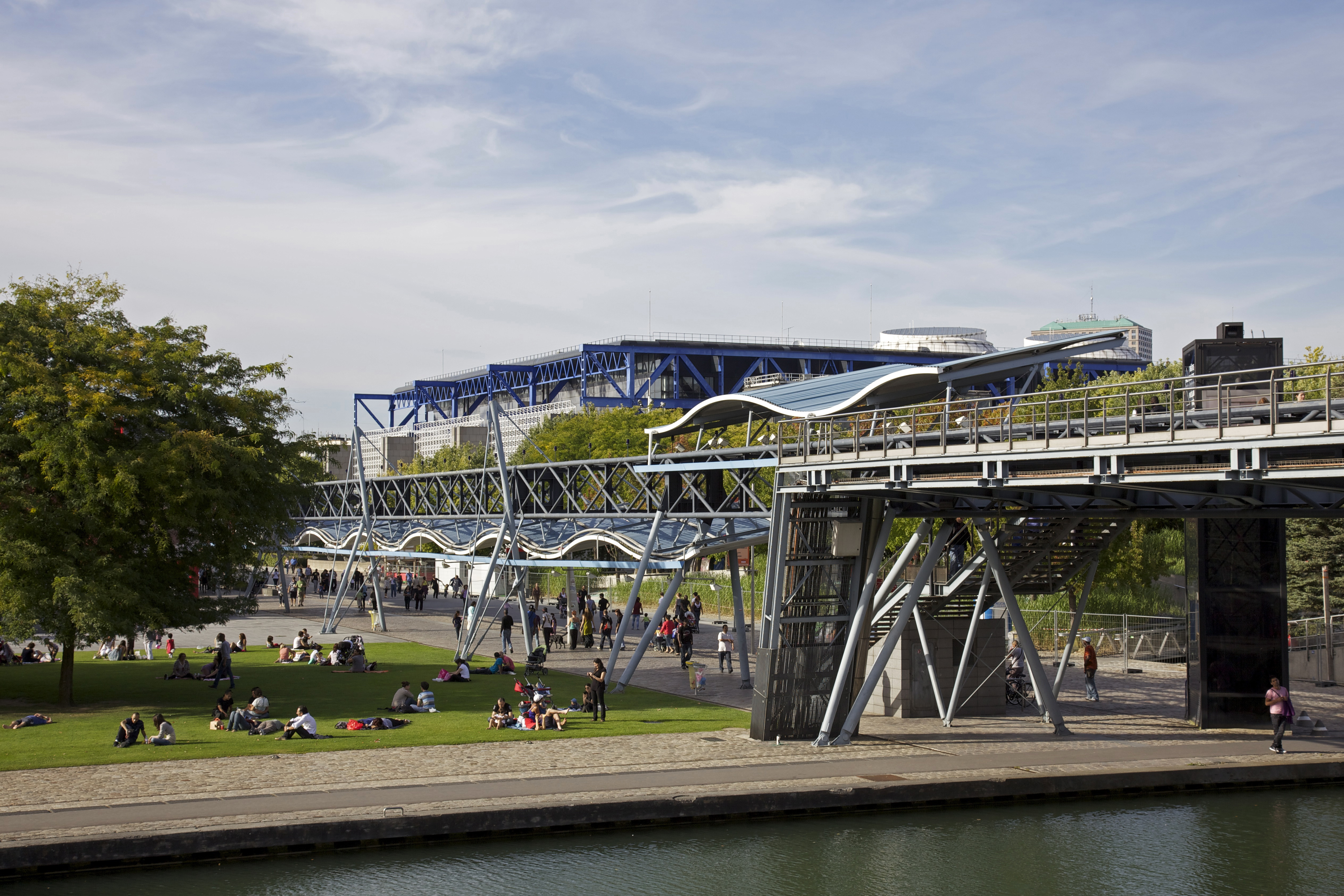
- Parc de la Villette
- Interactive map of Pont-de-Flandre
- Country: France
- Region: Île-de-France
- Ville: Paris
- Arrondissement: 19th

Area
  - Total: 2.377 km^{2} (0.918 sq mi)

Population (2016)
  - Total: 31,753
  - Density: 13,358/km^{2} (34,600/sq mi)

The Quartier du Pont-de-Flandre is the 74th administrative quarter of Paris, located in the 19th arrondissement.

This district is where the former Paris slaughterhouses were located. It takes its name from the Pont de Flandre (Flanders Bridge), which corresponds to the section of Avenue Corentin-Cariou that spans the Canal Saint-Denis.

The quarters of the 19th arrondissement

== Geography ==
The Quartier du Pont-de-Flandre forms the northern quarter of the 19th arrondissement.

Boundaries:

- North: Aubervilliers (between Porte d'Aubervilliers and Porte de la Villette);
- East: Pantin (between Porte de la Villette and Porte de Pantin);
- South: Quartier d'Amérique (separated by Avenue Jean-Jaurès);
- Southwest: Quartier de la Villette (separated by Rue de l'Ourcq);
- West: 18th arrondissement, Quartier de La Chapelle (separated by Rue d'Aubervilliers).

== History ==
The district was created in 1859 after the annexation of the commune of La Villette to Paris.

In 1859, shortly before this annexation, it was decided to build a livestock market and slaughterhouses in La Villette between the Ourcq Canal, the Route d'Allemagne (now Avenue Jean-Jaurès), and the Thiers fortified wall, thus transferring the livestock markets of Poissy and Sceaux to the future city walls of Paris. On the 39 hectares of land (later increased to 54 hectares) purchased by the City of Paris for 8,500,000 francs (forming today the Parc de la Villette), buildings designed by the architect Louis-Adolphe Janvier were erected, based on preliminary designs by Victor Baltard, of which the Grande Halle de la Villette is the only remaining vestige today.

== Buildings and monuments ==
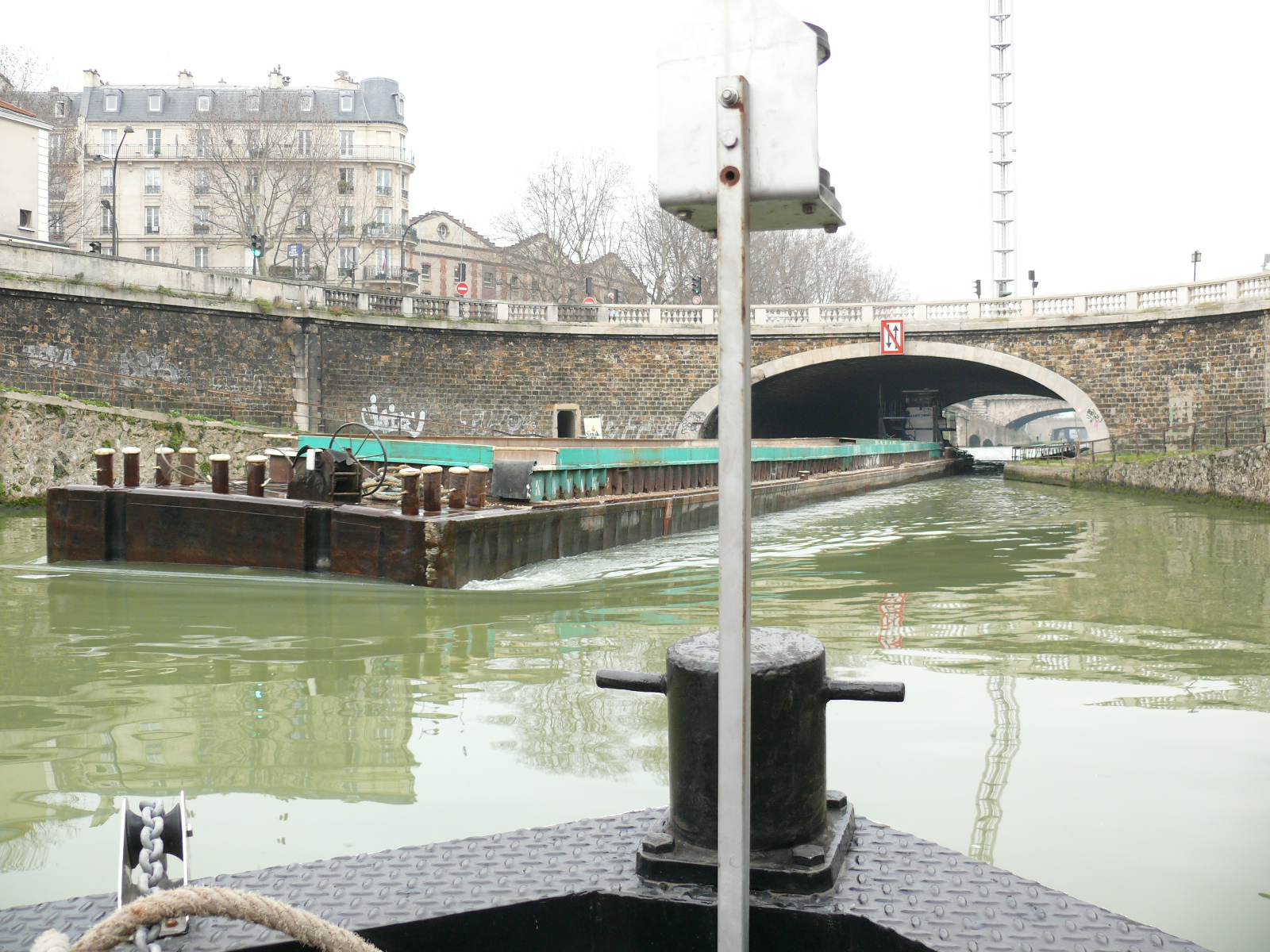
The Pont de Flandre over the Saint-Denis canal, which gives its name to the 74th quarter of Paris.

- Conservatoire de Paris
- Parc de la Villette
- Cité de la Musique
- Fountain of the Nubian Lions
- Grande halle de la Villette
- Théâtre de la Villette
- Le Zénith
- Cité des Sciences et de l'Industrie
- La Géode
- Maison de la Villette
- Écluse de la Villette
- Îlot Oise-Barbanègre
- Cité des Eiders
- ECollège Edmond-Michelet
- Saint-Luc de Paris Church
- Pont de la rue de l'Ourcq
- Parc du Pont de Flandre
