= Quartier de la Villette =

Coordinates: 48.8843439°N 2.3694611°E

Villette
- Quartier de la Villette
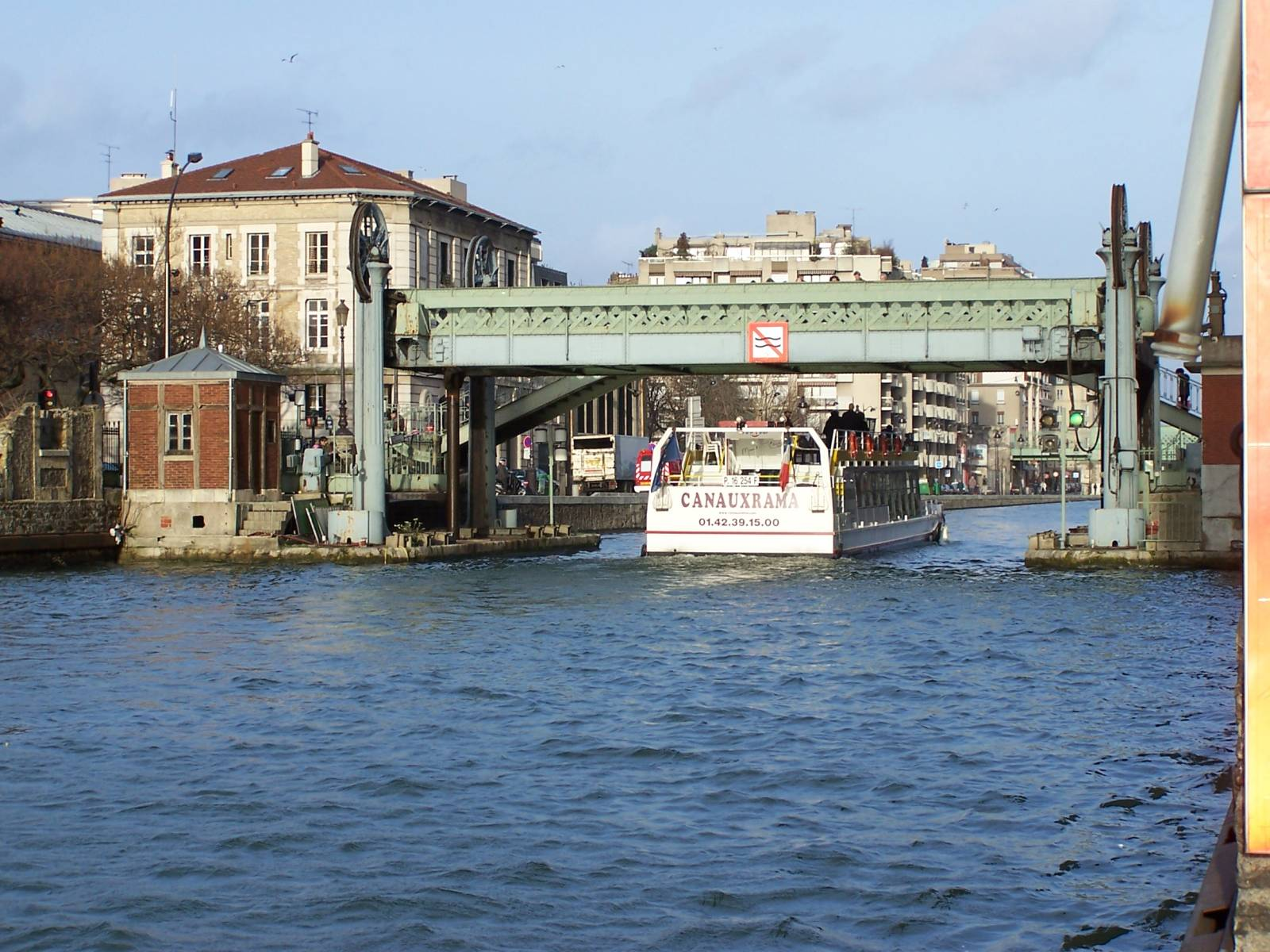
- Pont levant, rue de Crimée
- Interactive map of Villette
- Country: France
- Region: Île-de-France
- Ville: Paris
- Arrondissement: 19th

Area
  - Total: 1.286 km^{2} (0.497 sq mi)

Population (2016)
  - Total: 55,348
  - Density: 43,039/km^{2} (111,470/sq mi)

The Quartier de la Villette (commonly known as "La Villette") is the 73rd administrative quarter of Paris, located in the 19th arrondissement, in the northeast of the city.

It includes the Bassin de la Villette, with:

- the former general stores, now converted into student residences belonging to the Cité Universitaire;
- the last remaining drawbridge in Paris: the Crimée Street drawbridge;
- the MK2 cinema complex, "Quai de Loire / Quai de Seine";
- the Place de la Bataille-de-Stalingrad and the Rotonde de la Villette.

== Geography ==
The Quartier de la Villette forms the western quarter of the 19th arrondissement. Its boundaries are:

- northeast, border with the Quartier du Pont-de-Flandre: Rue de l'Ourcq;
- southeast, border with the Quartier du Combat: Rue de Meaux and Avenue Jean-Jaurès;
- southwest, border with the 10th arrondissement (Quartier de l'Hôpital-Saint-Louis and Quartier Saint-Vincent-de-Paul): Boulevard de la Villette;
- northwest, border with the 18th arrondissement: Rue d'Aubervilliers.

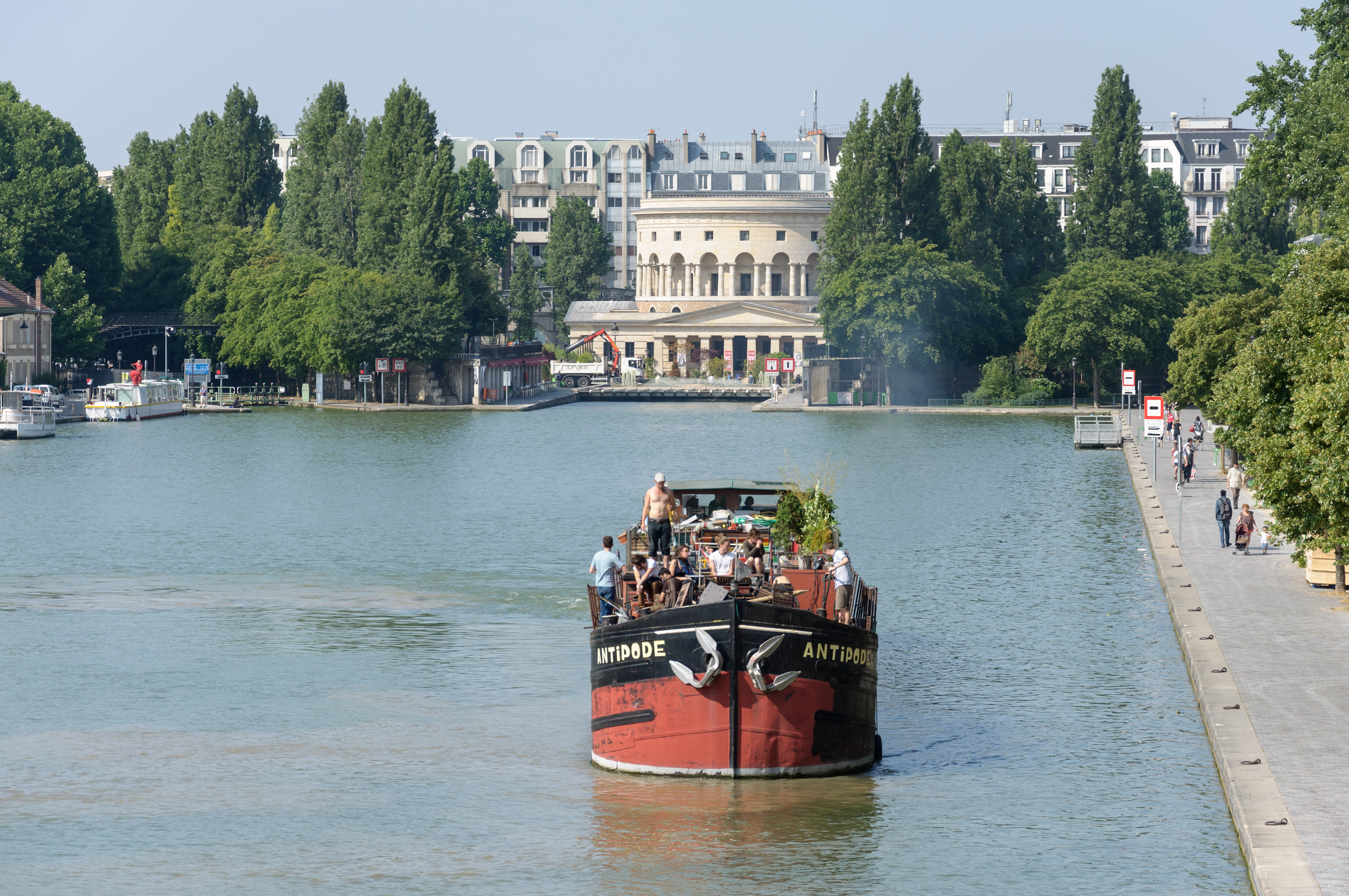
The Bassin de la Villette, with the Rotonde de la Villette in the background.

The quarters of the 19th arrondissement

== History ==
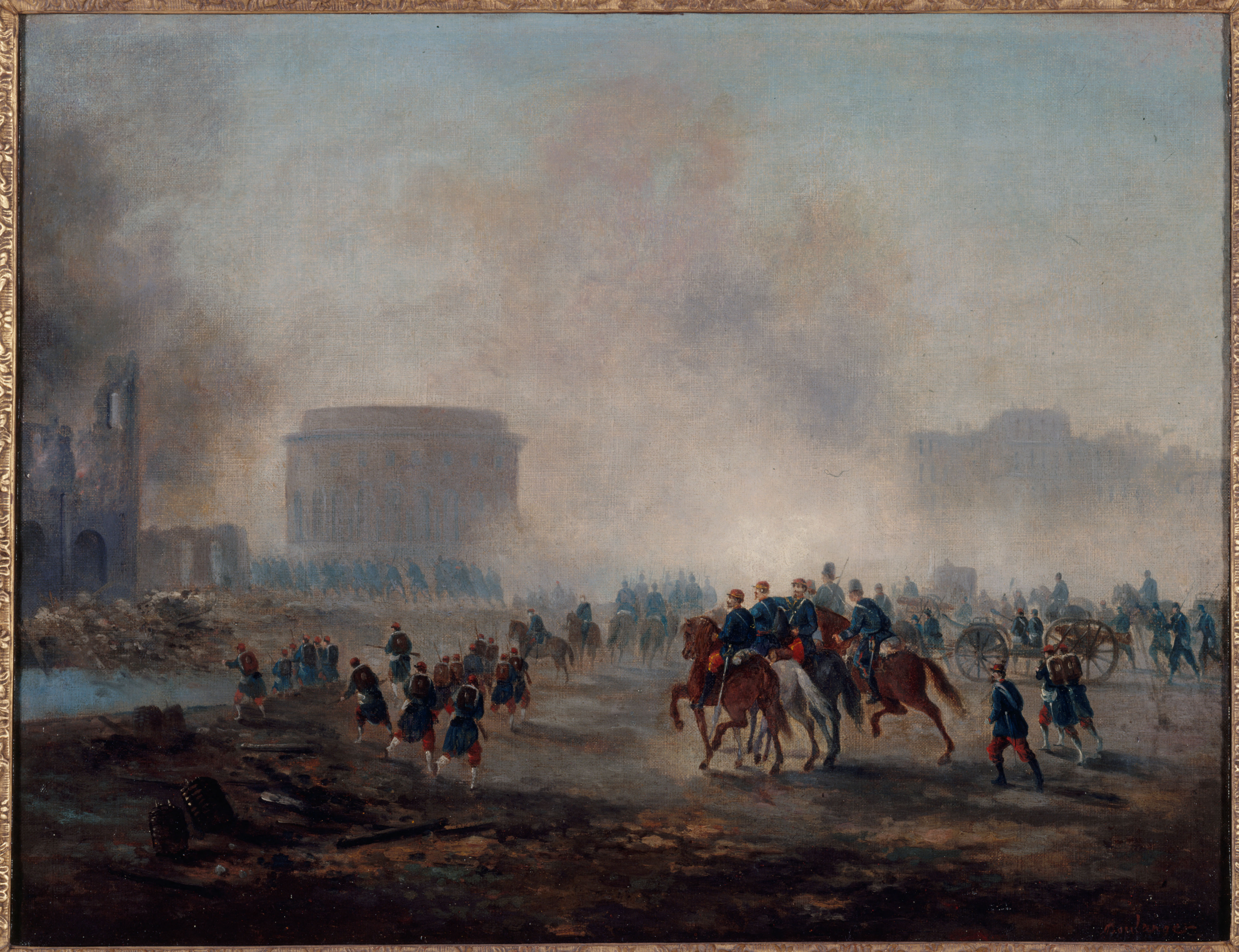
La Villette surrounded by Versailles troops, May 1871 by Gustave Boulanger (Carnavalet Museum).

The Quartier de la Villette originated from the former commune of La Villette, one of the four communes fully annexed to Paris (and thus dissolved) in 1860.

The former village of La Villette, located on the Paris-Flanders axis via Senlis, was connected to Paris by three gates in the Wall of the Fermiers généraux: the "Vertus" gate, the "Villette" gate, and the "Combat" gate.

== Buildings and monuments ==
- Saint-Jacques-Saint-Christophe de la Villette
- Cent Quatre
