= Quartier de Saint-Fargeau =

Coordinates: 48.8703698°N 2.4117691°E

Saint-Fargeau
- Quartier de Saint-Fargeau
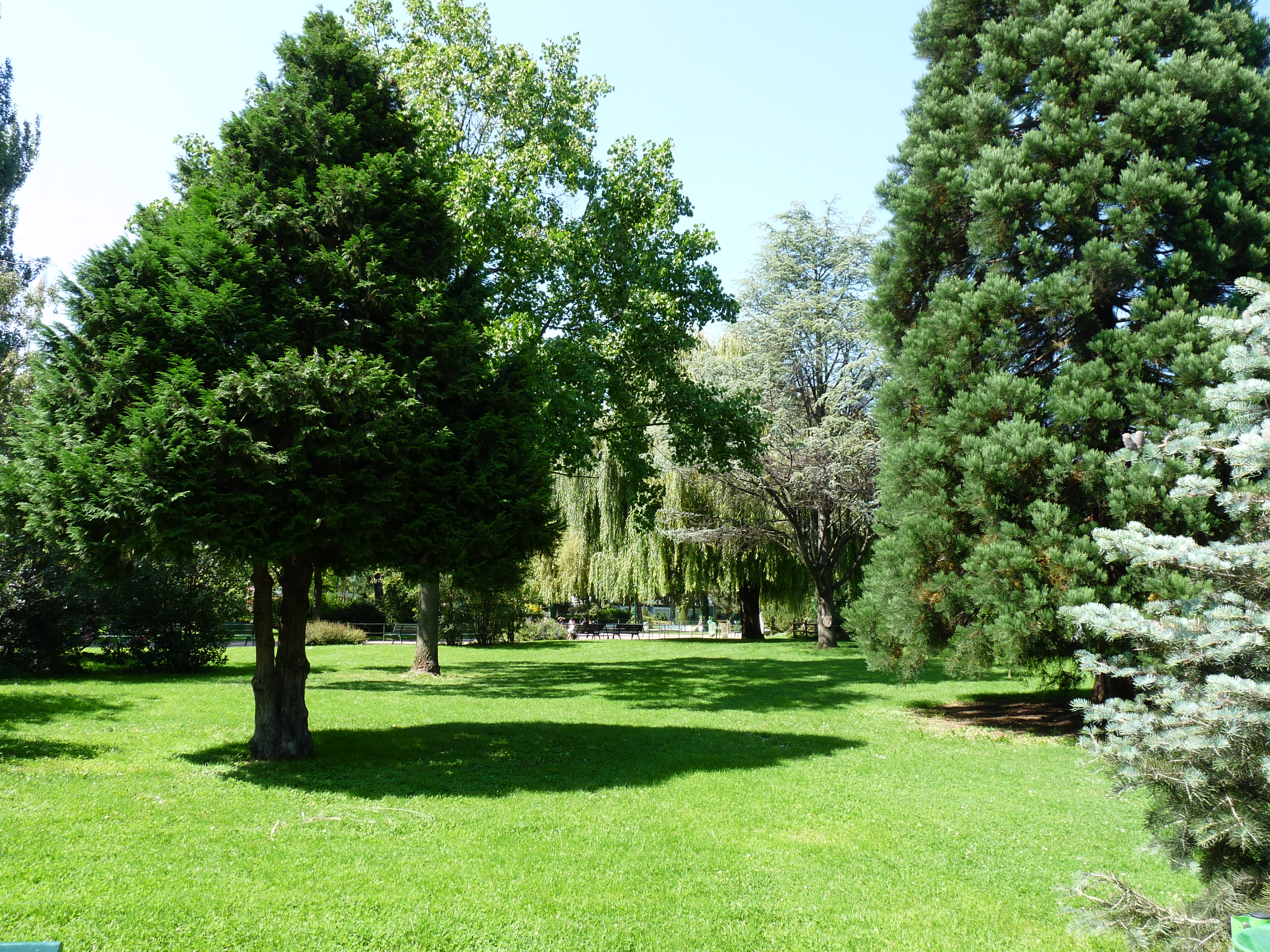
- Square Emmanuel-Fleury
- Interactive map of Saint-Fargeau
- Country: France
- Region: Île-de-France
- Ville: Paris
- Arrondissement: 20th

Area
  - Total: 1.487 km^{2} (0.574 sq mi)

Population (2016)
  - Total: 46,320
  - Density: 31,150/km^{2} (80,700/sq mi)

The Quartier de Saint-Fargeau is the 78th administrative quarter of Paris located in the 20th arrondissement, in a triangle formed by the town hall of the 20th on Place Gambetta, the Porte des Lilas and the Porte de Bagnolet.

The quarters of the 20th arrondissement.

== Origin of the name ==
The name originates from the Saint-Fargeau park, remains of the Lepeletier de Saint-Fargeau castle or Château de Ménilmontant, which belonged to Louis-Michel le Peletier, marquis de Saint-Fargeau (1760-1793).

== History ==
The administrative district was established in 1859 following the incorporation of the communes of Charonne and Belleville into Paris.

Its northern half comprised the territory of the former park of the Château de Ménilmontant, with the exception of its northernmost point between Rue de Belleville and Rue de Romainville, which was located within the Quartier d'Amérique of the 19th arrondissement. It extended south of Rue du Surmelin, which ran alongside the park's perimeter wall, into part of the former commune of Charonne (the "Quartier des Montiboeufs", the "Campagne à Paris", and the "Quartier de la Cour des Noues"). After the decommissioning of the Thiers Wall in 1919, the territories located within the non-building zone of the fortifications (the Zone) in the communes of Bagnolet and Les Lilas were annexed to Paris by decrees of July 27, 1930. The Paris ring road (Boulevard Périphérique) was later built on this site.

At the beginning of the 20th century, the neighborhood was still only partially developed. Sand quarries were in operation on Rue Pelleport and Rue du Télégraphe, and a clay quarry on Rue du Surmelin was used for brick and tile production shortly before 1914. South of the former park, the area around the Church of the Sacred Heart of Jesus was not developed until 1913 and was built upon in the 1920s. The Quartier Saint-Fargeau, which included a few industrial establishments until the 1960s, has become entirely residential.

== Notable buildings ==
This area includes, among other things, the Hôpital Tenon, the villas of the Campagne à Paris, the Square Séverine, the Olympic swimming pool, the Ménilmontant reservoir and the Belleville reservoir, and a large group of 19th and 20th century barracks, used by the administration of the Ministry of Armed Forces, including the DGSE next to the Piscine des Tourelles.

== Personalities from the neighborhood ==
Albert Besson, a physician specializing in hygiene, member of the National Academy of Medicine, municipal councillor for the district and vice-president of the general council (from 1929 to 1936). He was the one who took the initiative to have the construction of the Séverine square voted on, along the Boulevard Mortier.
