= Mechanically stabilized earth =

Soil constructed with artificial reinforcing

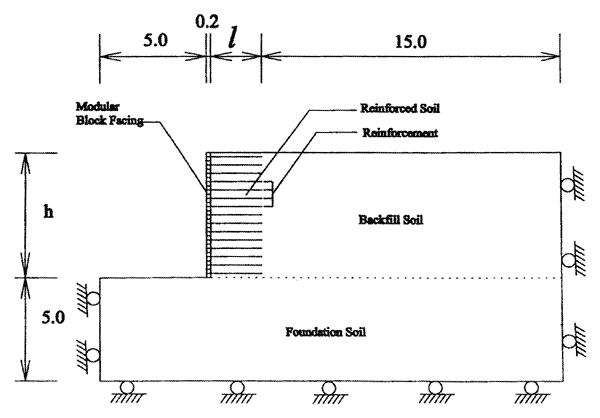
A diagram of a mechanically stabilized earth wall as it would be modeled in a finite element analysis.

Mechanically stabilized earth (MSE or reinforced soil) is soil constructed with artificial reinforcing. It can be used for retaining walls, bridge abutments, seawalls, and dikes. Although the basic principles of MSE have been used throughout history, MSE was developed in its current form in the 1960s. The reinforcing elements used can vary but include steel and geosynthetics.

MSE is the term usually used in the US to distinguish it from the trade name "Reinforced Earth". Elsewhere "reinforced soil" is the generally accepted term.

== Description ==
MSE walls stabilize unstable slopes and retain the soil on steep slopes and under crest loads. The wall face is often of precast, segmental blocks, panels or geocells that can tolerate some differential movement. The walls are infilled with granular soil, with or without reinforcement, while retaining the backfill soil. Reinforced walls utilize horizontal layers typically of geogrids. The reinforced soil mass, along with the facing, forms the wall. In many types of MSE’s, each vertical fascia row is inset, thereby providing individual cells that can be infilled with topsoil and planted with vegetation to create a green wall.

The main advantages of MSE walls compared to conventional reinforced concrete walls are their ease of installation and quick construction. They do not require formwork or curing and each layer is structurally sound as it is laid, reducing the need for support, scaffolding or cranes. They also do not require additional work on the facing.

In addition to the flexibility of MSE walls in design and construction, seismic testing conducted on a large scale shaking table laboratory at the Japan National Institute of Agricultural Engineering (Tsukuba City), showed that modular block reinforced walls, and even more so geocell retention walls, retain sufficient flexibility to withstand large deformations without loss of structural integrity, and have high seismic load resistance. Highway overpasses along interstates often employ the INTER-LOK System.

== History ==
Using straw, sticks, and branches to reinforce adobe bricks and mud dwellings has happened since the earliest part of human history, Parts of the Great Wall of China are formed as reinforced soil as are the ziggurats of the Middle East.

In the 1960s French engineer Henri Vidal invented the modern form of MSE, termed terre armée (reinforced earth), using steel strip reinforcements. The first geosynthetic-reinforced soil walls were built in France in 1970 and 1971. Geosynthetic-reinforced walls have been in use in the United States since 1974. Bell and Steward (1977) describe some of these early applications, which were primarily geotextile wrapped-face walls supporting logging roads in the northwestern United States.

Since the 1980s the development of reinforced soil has been dramatic using a range of construction forms and reinforcements including metallic and polymeric anchors, strips and grids. The first modern forms of reinforced soil were constructed in Europe in the late 1960s. The first MSE wall in the United States was built in 1971 on State Route 39 near Los Angeles.

== Reinforcement ==
Reinforcement placed in horizontal layers throughout the height of the wall provides the tensile strength to hold the soil together. The reinforcement materials of MSE can vary. Originally, long steel strips 50 to 120 mm (2 to 5 in) wide were used as reinforcement. These strips are sometimes ribbed, although not always, to provide added friction. There are also prefabricated pile sleeve options to reduce negative skin friction on piles embedded behind MSE bridge abutments. Sometimes steel grids or meshes are also used as reinforcement. Several types of geosynthetics can be used including geogrids and geotextiles. The reinforcing geosynthetics can be made of high-density polyethylene, polyester, and polypropylene. These materials may be ribbed and are available in various sizes and strengths.

For erosion control and load support the upper layer can be reinforced by geocell materials.

== See also ==
- Soil stabilization
