= Quartier d'Amérique =

Coordinates: 48.87747573852539°N 2.3934500217437744°E

Amérique
- Quartier d'Amérique
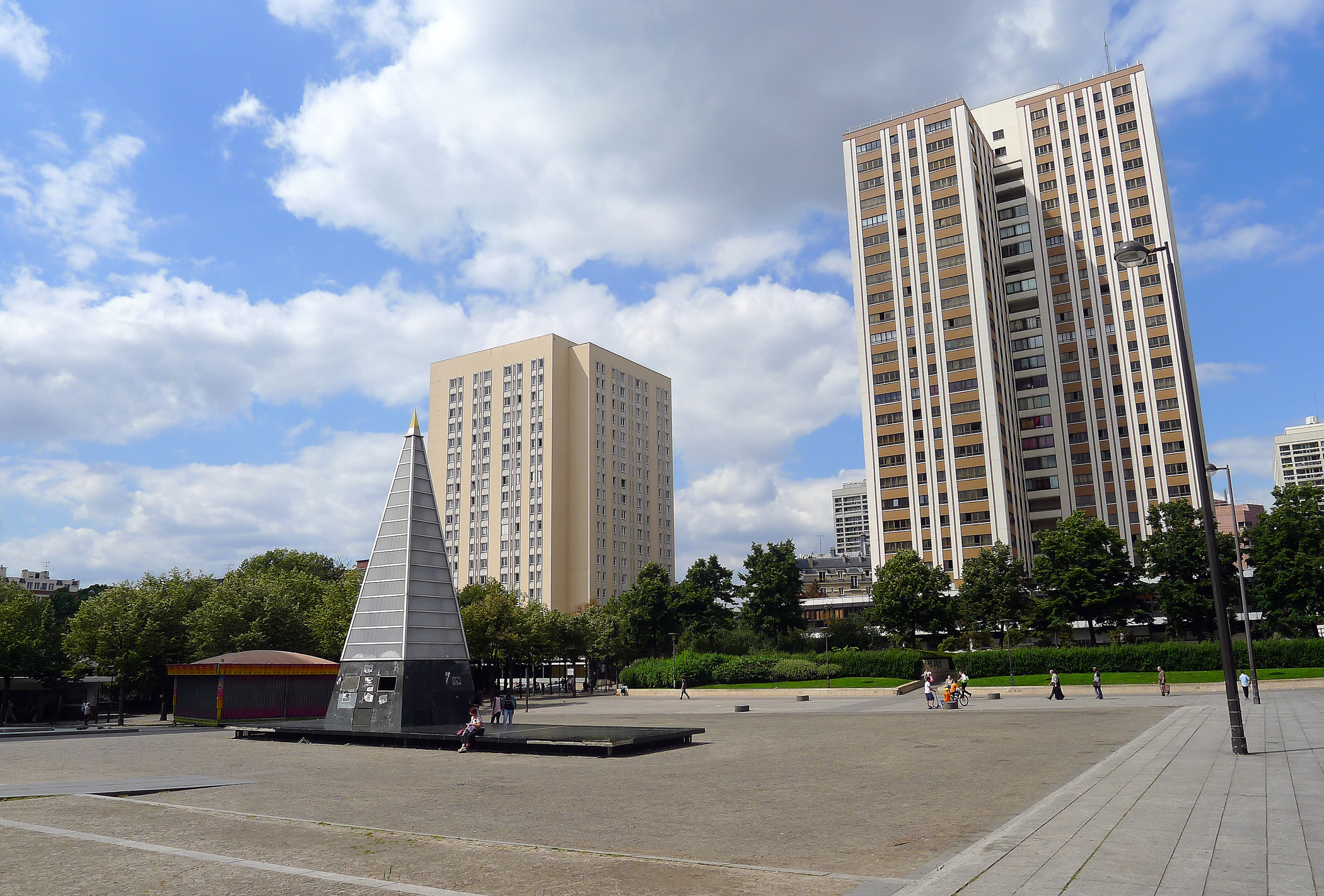
- Place des Fêtes
- Country: France
- Region: Île-de-France
- Ville: Paris
- Arrondissement: 19th

Area
  - Total: 1.836 km^{2} (0.709 sq mi)

Population (2016)
  - Total: 57,924
  - Density: 31,549/km^{2} (81,710/sq mi)

The Quartier d'Amérique is the 75th administrative quarter of Paris, located in its 19th arrondissement.

The quarters of the 19th arrondissement

== History ==
More than half of the neighborhood's territory was part of the former commune of Belleville, annexed to the city of Paris in 1860. This area was bordered by Rue de Belleville to the south, Boulevard Sérurier to the east, Rue des Carrières d'Amérique and Rue Manin to the north, and Rue de Crimée and Rue de la Villette to the west, encompassing the heart of the old village around the Church of Saint-Jean-Baptiste and Place des Fêtes.

The section bordered by Rue des Carrières d'Amérique and Rue Manin to the south, Boulevard Sérurier to the east, Rue Petit to the north, and Rue de Crimée to the east, extended into the territory of the former commune of La Villette. The area east of Boulevard Sérurier included the fortifications dismantled in 1919 and the non-building zone within the territory of Pré-Saint-Gervais until 1929, when it was annexed to Paris and subsequently redeveloped (construction of low-cost housing complexes, the Parc de la Butte-du-Chapeau-Rouge, and the ring road).

In this district were the "America Quarries", from which gypsum and millstones were extracted for the construction of Parisian buildings (in the central arrondissements). According to an urban legend, the quarries were so named because some of the plaster produced was supposedly exported and used to build the White House in Washington, D.C.. However, an information panel from the Paris City Hall explains that this is not the case. These quarries closed in 1873 and were filled in.

The Quartier de la Mouzaïa, with its picturesque low houses along alleyways called "villas", extends to their location.

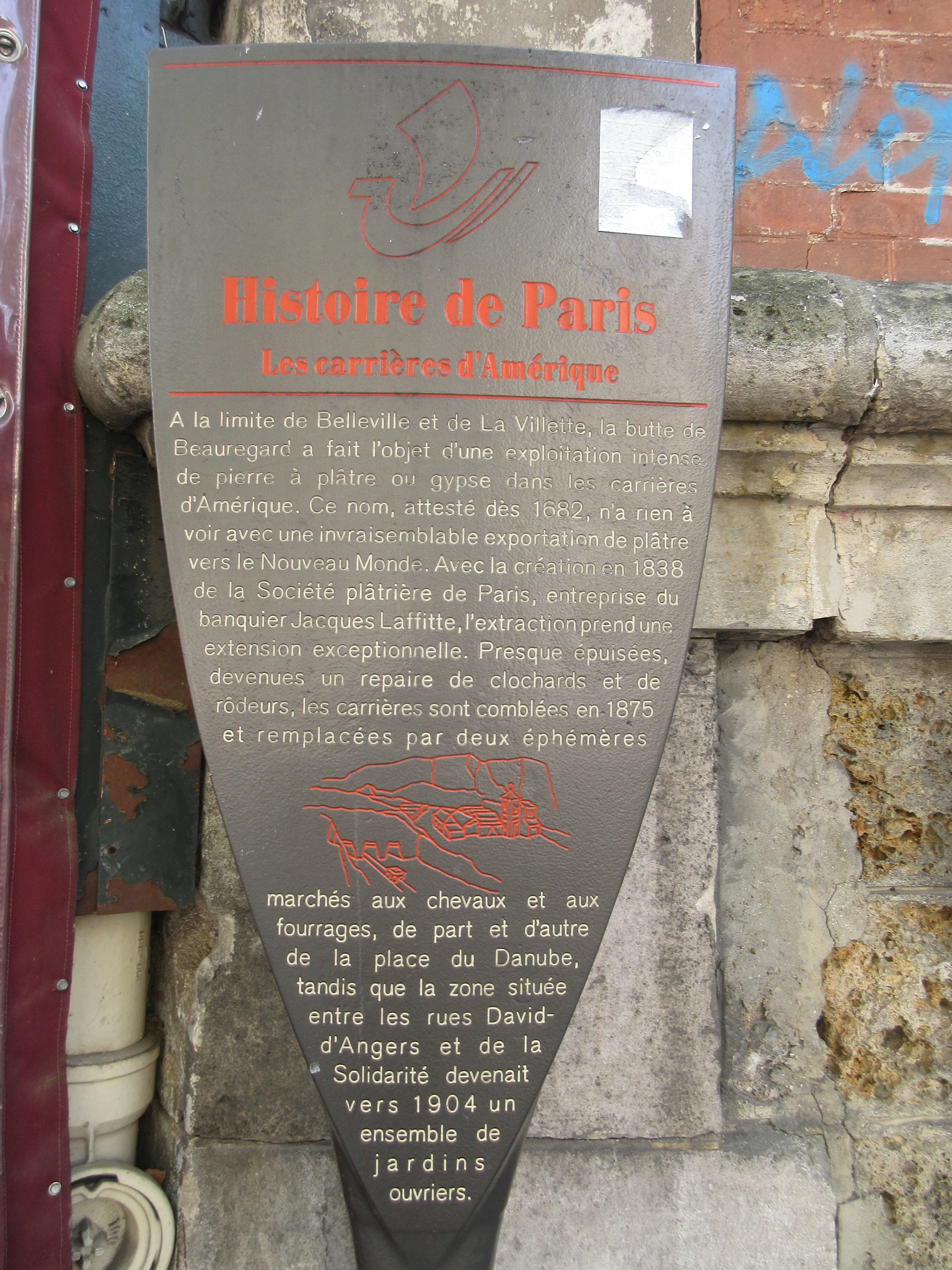
Histoire de Paris plaques :
« Carrières d'Amérique ».

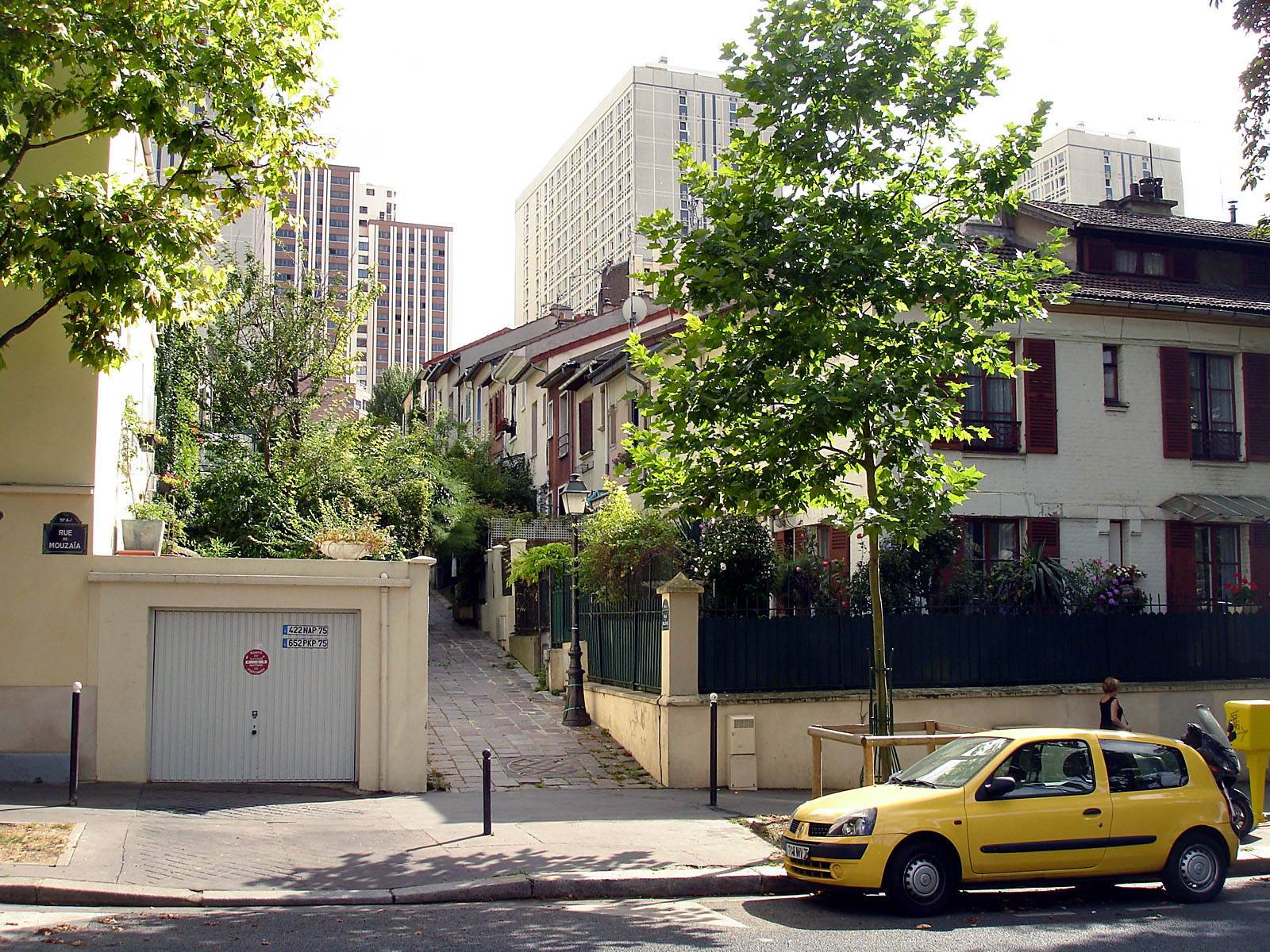
The Villa de Bellevue, seen from the rue de Mouzaïa. In the background, the towers of the Place des Fêtes contrast with the pavilions of the neighborhood, surrounded by small gardens.

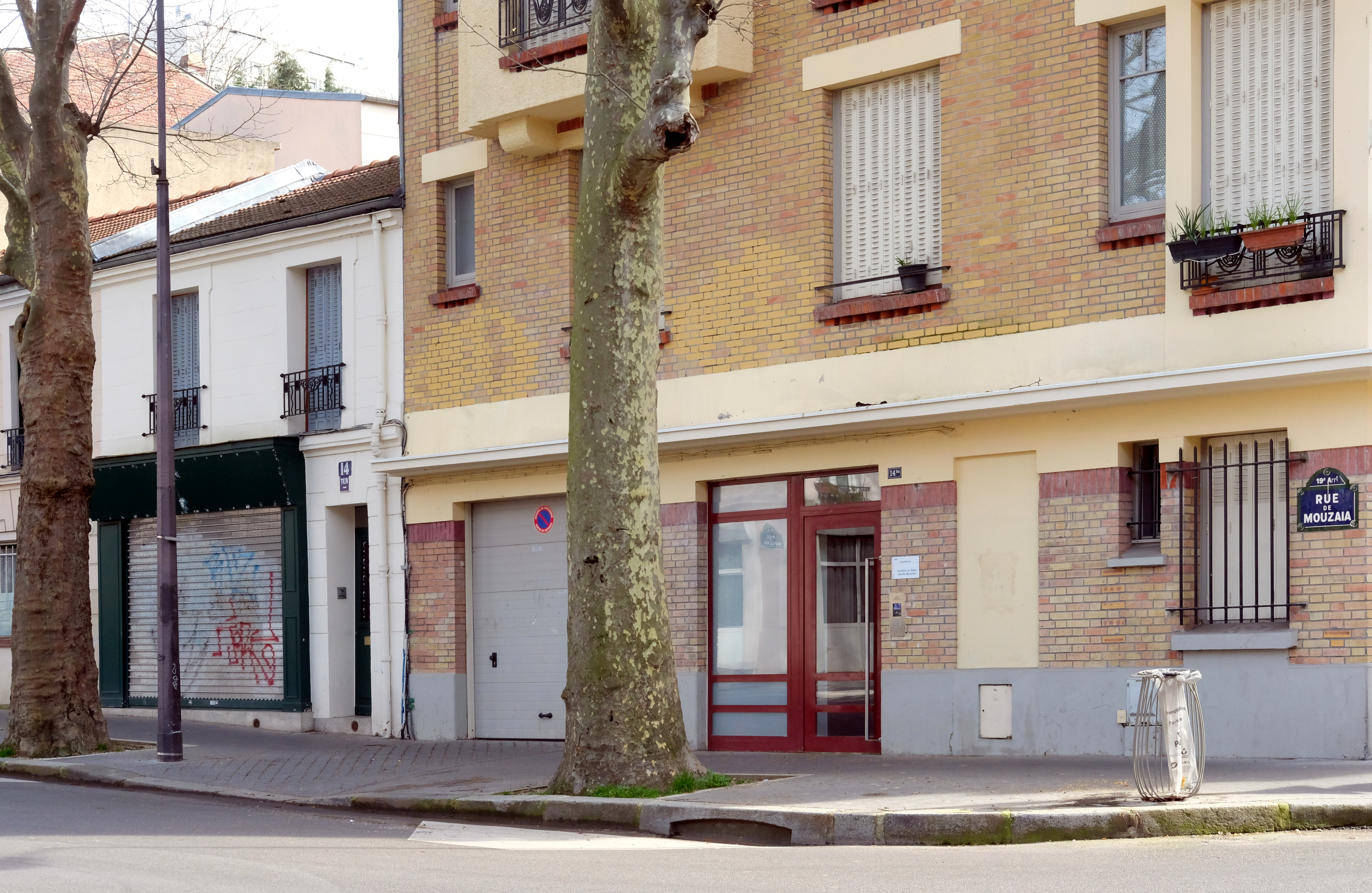
Houses and buildings on Mouzaïa Street.

Another part of the district underwent development in the 1960s and 1970s with the construction of towers in place of factories, workshops, houses and guinguettes, particularly around the Place des Fêtes.

== Buildings and monuments ==
- Regard de la Lanterne
- Regard Lecouteux
- Saint-Jean-Baptiste de Belleville
- Archives de Paris
- Notre-Dame-de-Fatima-Marie-Mediatrice
- Hôpital Robert-Debré
- Parc de la Butte-du-Chapeau-Rouge
- Quartier de la Mouzaïa
- Hameau du Danube
- Saint Francis of Assisi Church, Paris
- Sainte-Claire de Paris
- Sainte-Colette des Buttes-Chaumont
- Plaque commémorative – 1bis rue de la Solidarité, Paris 19e
