= Villette =

Villette or Villettes may refer to:

== People ==
- Arthur Villettes, (fl. 1746–1765), British diplomat
- Francois Villette (1621-1698), engineer, optician and fireworks expert at the court of Louis XIV of France
- Pierre Villette (1926–1998), French composer
- Rétaux de Villette (1759–1797), French forger

== Places ==
=== France ===
- Ernemont-la-Villette, in the Seine-Maritime département
- La Villette, Calvados
- Muille-Villette, in the Somme département
- Les Villettes, in the Haute-Loire département
- Villette-d'Anthon, in the Isère département
- Villette-de-Vienne, in the Isère département
- Villette-lès-Arbois, in the Jura département
- Villette-lès-Dole, in the Jura département
- Villette, Meurthe-et-Moselle
- Villette-sur-Ain, in the Ain département
- Villette-sur-Aube, in the Aube département
- Villettes, in the Eure département
- Villette, Yvelines

==== Paris ====
- Barrière de la Villette, on the Place de Stalingrad
- Bassin de la Villette, the largest artificial lake in Paris
- Château Villette, a manor
- La Villette, Seine, a French commune annexed by Paris in 1860
- Parc de la Villette, a.k.a. La Villette, an area in Paris, known for the Cité des Sciences et de l'Industrie science museum
  - Grande halle de la Villette, a cultural center within the Parc de la Villette
- Porte de la Villette station, a Paris Metro station

=== Other ===
- Villette (Charleroi Metro), Belgium
- Villette, Piedmont, in the province of Verbano-Cusio-Ossola, Italy
- Villette, Vaud, a commune in the canton of Vaud, Switzerland

== Other uses ==
- La Villette Charleroi, a Belgian table tennis club
- Villette (novel), by Charlotte Brontë, published in 1853
- Villette (TV series), a 1970 BBC television adaptation
