= Henri Vidal (engineer) =

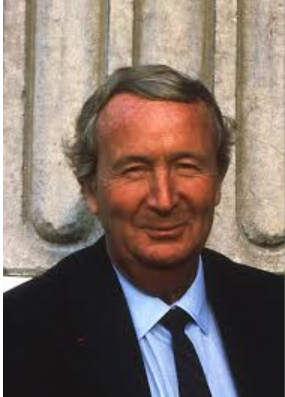
Portrait of Henri Vidal

Henri Vidal (10 February 1924 in Draguignan - 29 November 2007 in Porquerolles) was a French civil engineer, known for the invention, in 1963 of terre armée (reinforced earth), also known as mechanically stabilized earth.

Vidal entered the École Polytechnique in 1944 and graduated from the École Nationale des Ponts et Chaussées in 1949. Vidal had the hope of becoming an architect, and so he enrolled at the fine arts school, École des Beaux-Arts de Paris while continuing to work as an engineer in the maintenance department Électricité de France.

After graduating from the École des Beaux-Arts de Paris in 1961, he opened an architectural practice the same year, while continuing to work as an engineer at Fougerolles. As an architect, he collaborated with Yves Bayard to design the Musée d'art moderne et d'art contemporain in Nice., as well as his property at Domaine de la Courtade in Porquerolles, which now houses the Carmignac Foundation. His other architectural works included the church of Notre-Dame-de-Fatima, Paris.

After five years of establishing the theory for his process and of experiments on scale models, he filed the patent for reinforced earth in 1963.
