= Quartier du Combat =

Coordinates: 48.88015365600586°N 2.3826417922973633°E

Combat
- Quartier du Combat
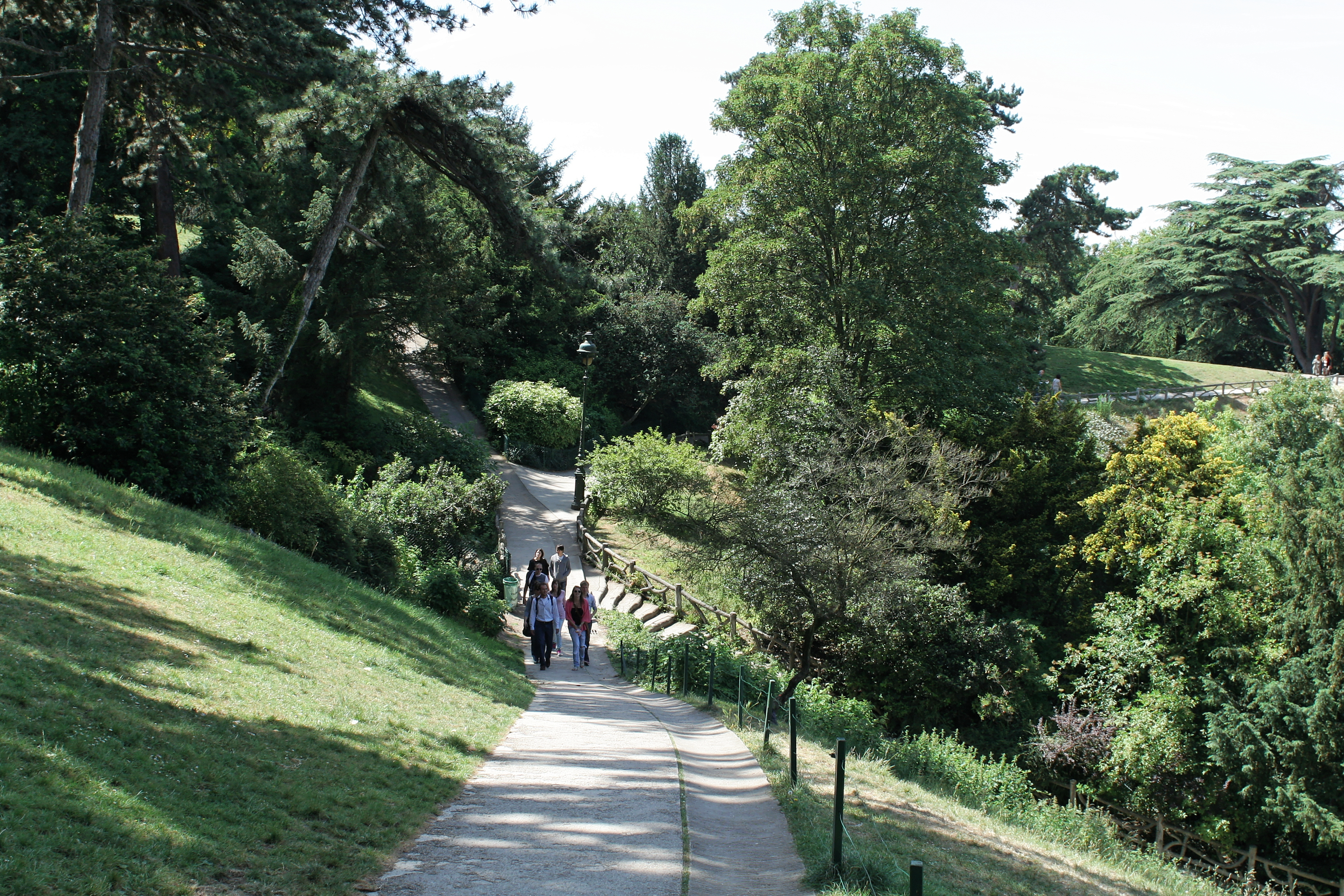
- Parc des Buttes Chaumont
- Interactive map of Combat
- Country: France
- Region: Île-de-France
- Ville: Paris
- Arrondissement: 19th

Area
  - Total: 1.295 km^{2} (0.500 sq mi)

Population (2016)
  - Total: 41,369
  - Density: 31,945/km^{2} (82,740/sq mi)

The Quartier du Combat is the 76th administrative quarter of Paris located in the 19th arrondissement.

The quarters of the 19th arrondissement

== Origin of the name ==
It takes its name from the "Place du Combat" which became the Place du Colonel Fabien in 1945.

== History ==
From 1781 to 1833, baitings were held there. Inside a wooden circus, one could witness fights between dogs and bulls, dogs and wild boars, and so on. The decree banning animal fights in Paris dates from 1833, according to Alfred Delvau, a journalist, in his Histoire anecdotique des Barrières de Paris (1865).

On this same square stood the Combat Gate, part of the Wall of the Fermiers généraux. It was positioned in a semicircle to keep the bloody spectacle outside the city limits.

Until the reign of Louis XIII, on a site probably located within the area now bounded by Rue de Meaux, Avenue Secrétan, and Rue Sadi-Lecointe, stood one of the most horrific places in Paris: the Gibbet of Montfaucon. Built before the Wall of the Fermiers généraux, it was then outside the city walls. Built on a small promontory, it has a masonry base upon which stand sixteen stone columns, each approximately 10 meters high, connected by three tiers of wooden beams. Up to fifty people could be hanged there at once. The upper tiers were reserved for those condemned to death of noble lineage. The gallows was later moved (after 1627) a little further along, to what is now the Rue de Meaux, on the site of the current Secrétan market hall.

=== Annexation of the communes of La Villette and Belleville to the city of Paris in 1860 ===
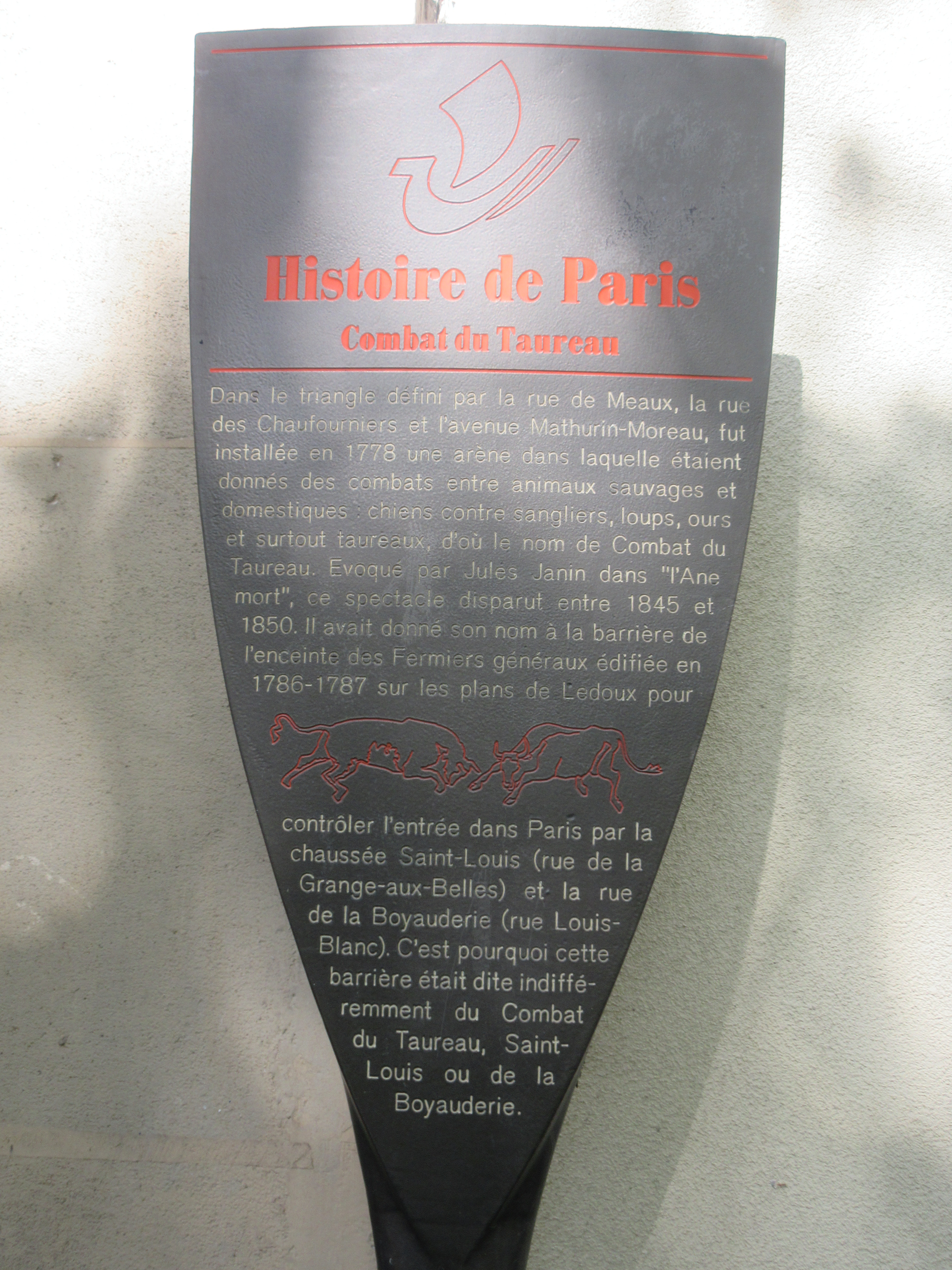
Histoire de Paris plaques « Baiting (blood sport) »

The territory of the district corresponds for the most part to that of the former commune of Belleville between the boulevard de la Villette, the streets of Meaux, Cavendish, the majority of the Parc des Buttes Chaumont (former quarries being developed at that time), the rue de la Villette and the rue de Belleville and for a small part between the streets Cavendish, de Meaux, de Crimée and the Buttes-Chaumont park to the former commune of La Villette.

== Buildings and monuments ==
- 19th arrondissement town hall.
- Monument to Jean Macé.
- Parc des Buttes Chaumont, which includes:
  - Île du Belvédère;
  - the gatehouse.
- Butte Bergeyre, west of Buttes-Chaumont.
- Hôpital Fondation Adolphe de Rothschild.
- Saint-Pierre Lutheran Church.
- Church of Saint-George de la Villette.
- Secrétan Market, 46 Rue de Meaux.
- Notre-Dame-de-l'Assomption-des-Buttes-Chaumont Church.
- Headquarters of the French Communist Party.
- St. Sergius Institute
