= Grande halle de la Villette =

Slaughterhouse and cultural center in Paris

Coordinates: 48°53′27″N 2°23′27″E

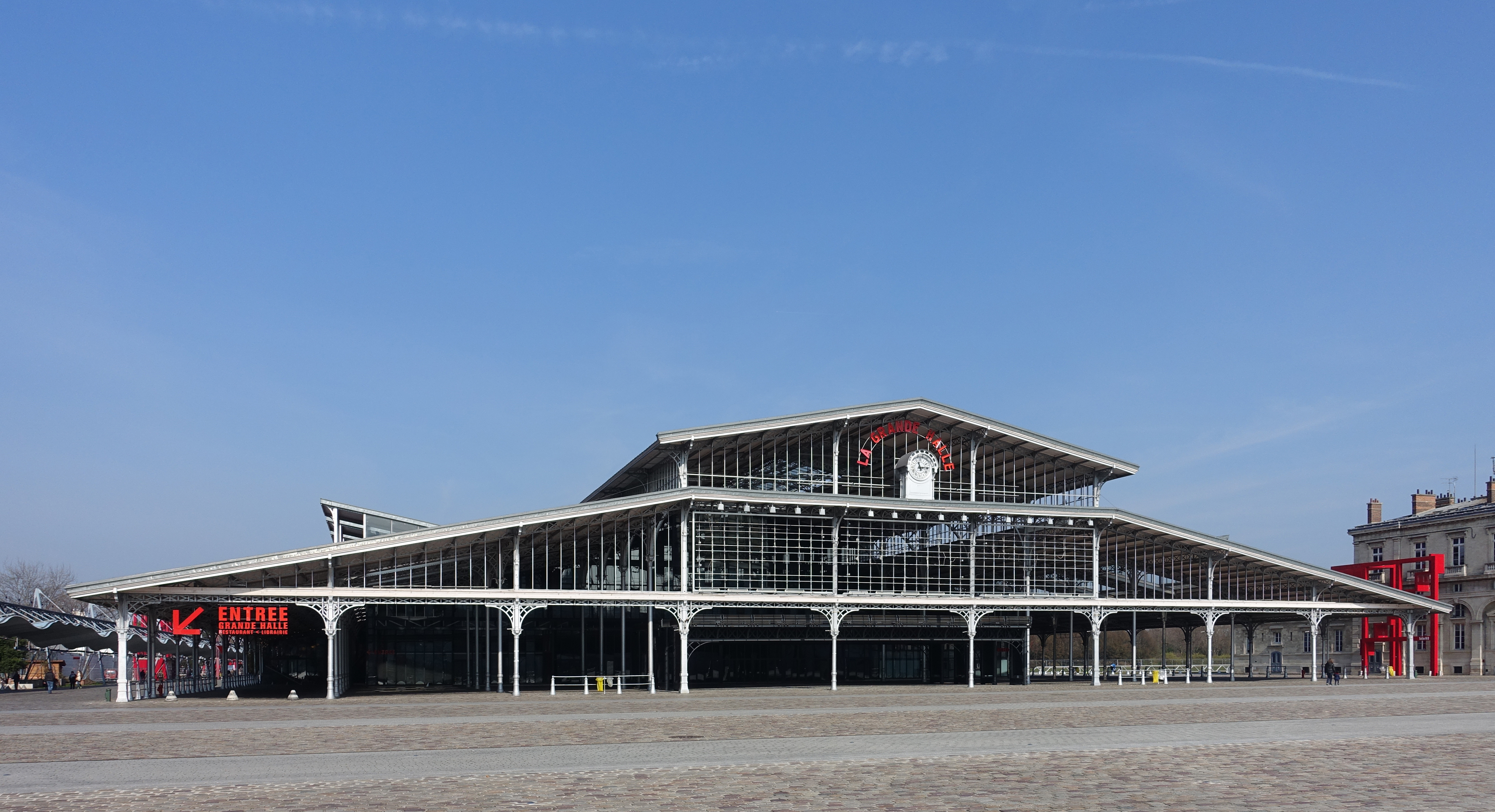
Grande halle de la Villette, 2016

The Grande halle de la Villette (originally: Grande Halle aux Boeufs; translation: "Great Hall of Cattle"), formerly a slaughterhouse and now a cultural center, is located in Paris, France. It is situated on Place de la Fontaine aux Lions within the Parc de la Villette, in the 19th arrondissement. While the Grande Halle is within Paris' main abattoir district, the historical building now serves as a venue for trade fairs, exhibitions, music festivals, and open-air cinema.

== History ==
La Villette ("a world apart") was a warehouse district and industrial section of northeastern Paris, stretching within a plain formed between the Goutte d'Or and the Buttes-Chaumont, and built around the Canal de l'Ourcq and the Canal Saint-Denis. As part of Haussmann's renovation of Paris, Baron Georges-Eugène Haussmann proposed concentrating all the abattoirs and meat markets on the city's outskirts at La Villette.

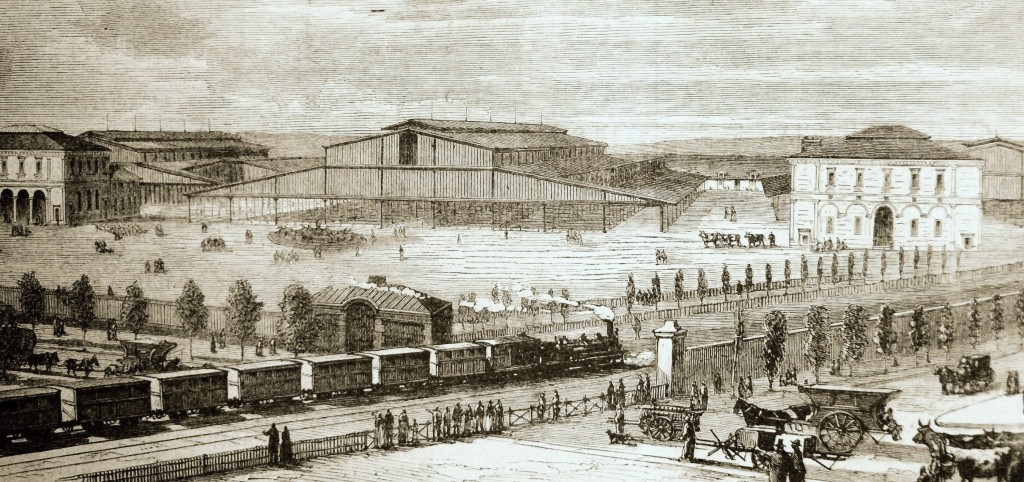
The Grande halle de la Villette, 1867, pictured between the other two slaughterhouses.

Designed by Jules de Mérindol and Louis-Adolphe Janvier (1818–1878), construction of the Grande Halle took place during the period of 1865–1867. While the La Villette complex opened in the 1860s with a total of three market halls, only the Grande Halle aux Boeufs, preserved for its architectural value, survives. La Villette took on a nickname la Cité du Sang ("city of blood") by butchers, or La Villetouse.

In 1970, the City of Paris ceded Villette's land and its management to the national government, and four years later, Villette's slaughterhouses ceased operations. In 1979, l'Etablissement Public du Parc de la Villette (EPPV) was created to restore and manage Villette's 55 hectare site; and the slaughterhouse/market became a Monument historique. François Mitterrand's 1982 announcement of Les Grands Projets' included Parc de la Villette, and in that year, Bernard Reichen and Philippe Robert were selected for the Grande Halle's restoration. After renovation completion, Mitterrand opened the restored Grande Halle in January 1985. In 1993, by government decree No. 93-96, the EPPV was renamed L’Etablissement public du Parc et de la grande halle de la Villette ("The Public Establishment of the Park and the Great Hall de la Villette"; EPPGHV). Another Grande Halle renovation occurred in 2005–2007. The production designer Guy-Claude François collaborated with architects in the conception of the hall's performance stage.

== Architecture and fittings ==
The Grande Halle is made of cast iron and glass. It covers an area of 20,000 square metres (220,000 sq ft), and measures 250 metres (820 ft) by 85 metres (279 ft). Three sides are open while the fourth, made of glass, is the entrance to the hall. Speakers are hung from hooks on the overhead canopy and not easily visible to the public in order to separate the listener from the building's technical elements; however, there is a slight reverberation because of the glass roof. The hall's far end is described as the central axis of the building's main visual field. Plans for an organic restaurant by architects Gilles & Boissier include using an adjacent garden as a source for menu requirements; Café de la Villette is 400 square metres (4,300 sq ft) in size.
