= Notre-Dame-de-Fatima-Marie-Mediatrice (19th arrondissement) =

Church in Paris, France

Coordinates: 48°52′45″N 2°24′10″E

Notre Dame de Fatima
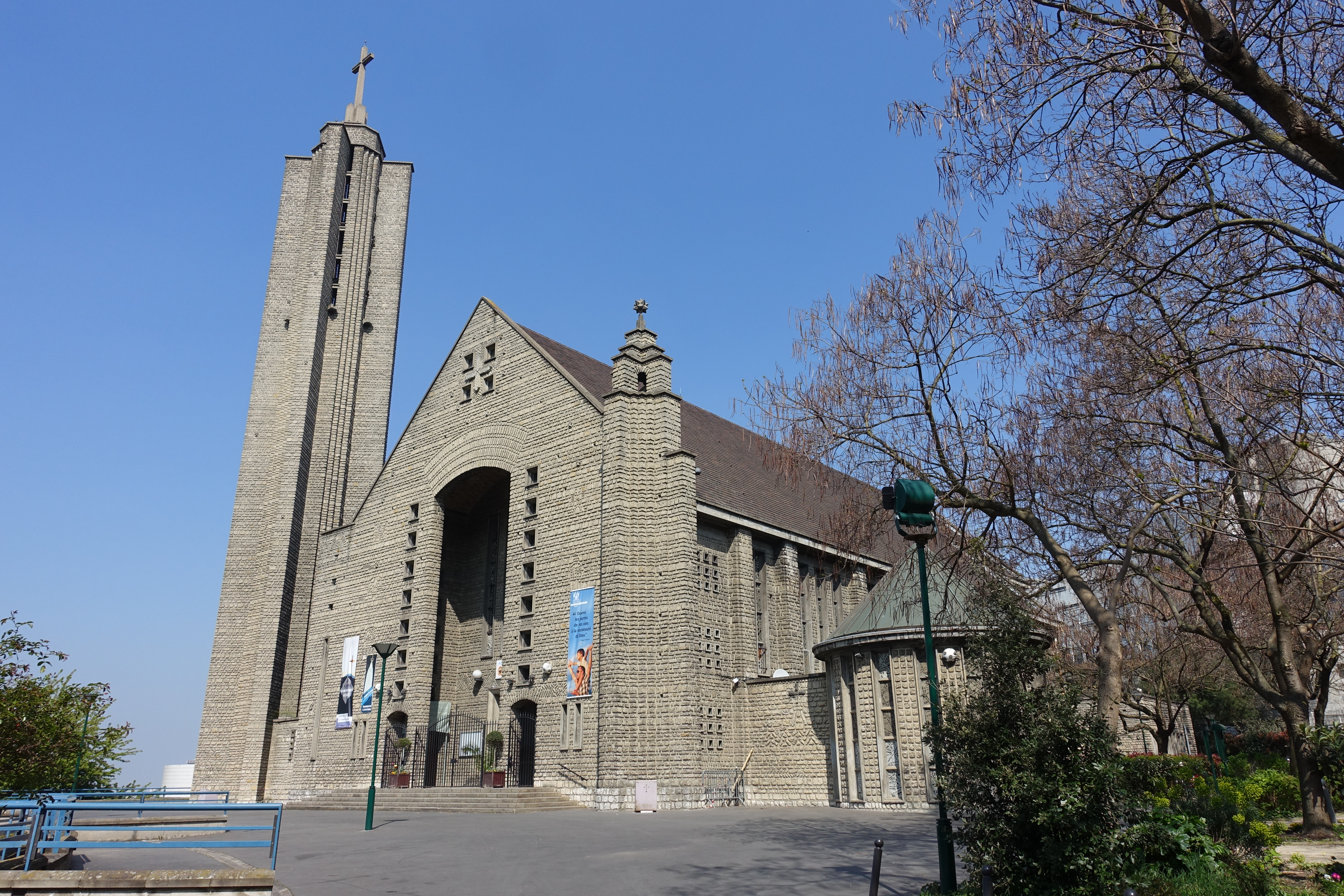
- Notre-Dame-de-Fatima

Religion
- Affiliation: Catholic Church
- Province: Archdiocese of Paris
- Rite: Roman Rite

Location
- Location: 19th arrondissement of Paris
- Interactive map of Notre Dame de Fatima

Architecture
- Style: Neo-Romanesque
- Groundbreaking: 1950
- Completed: 1954

Notre-Dame-de-Fatima is a Roman Catholic church located in the 19th arrondissement of Paris, at the intersection of Boulevard Serurier and avenue Porte-des-Pre-Saint-Gervais. Built between 1950 and 1954 as a parish church, it was originally known as the Église de Marie-Médiatrice-de-Toutes-les-Grâces. It now serves the Portuguese community of the arrondissement under its new name.

== History ==
The church was originally intended by Cardinal Suhard of Paris as a gesture of gratitude for the fact that Paris emerged from the Second World War with minimal damage. The architect of the church was Henri Vidal, best-known as a structural engineer. It was constructed between 1950 and 1954 to serve a large residential community planned for the arrondissement. However, plans changed and the residential community was never built, leaving the church without a congregation, and separated from the community by a new ring highway. It was closed between 1974 and 1988, finally reopening after the construction of the Hospital Robert-Debre next to the church. The church was given to the Portuguese community of Paris. The church gave up its original name, Marie-Mediatrice-des-Toutes-les-Graces, and became Notre-Dame de Fatima, in honor of the Portuguese saint.

== Exterior ==
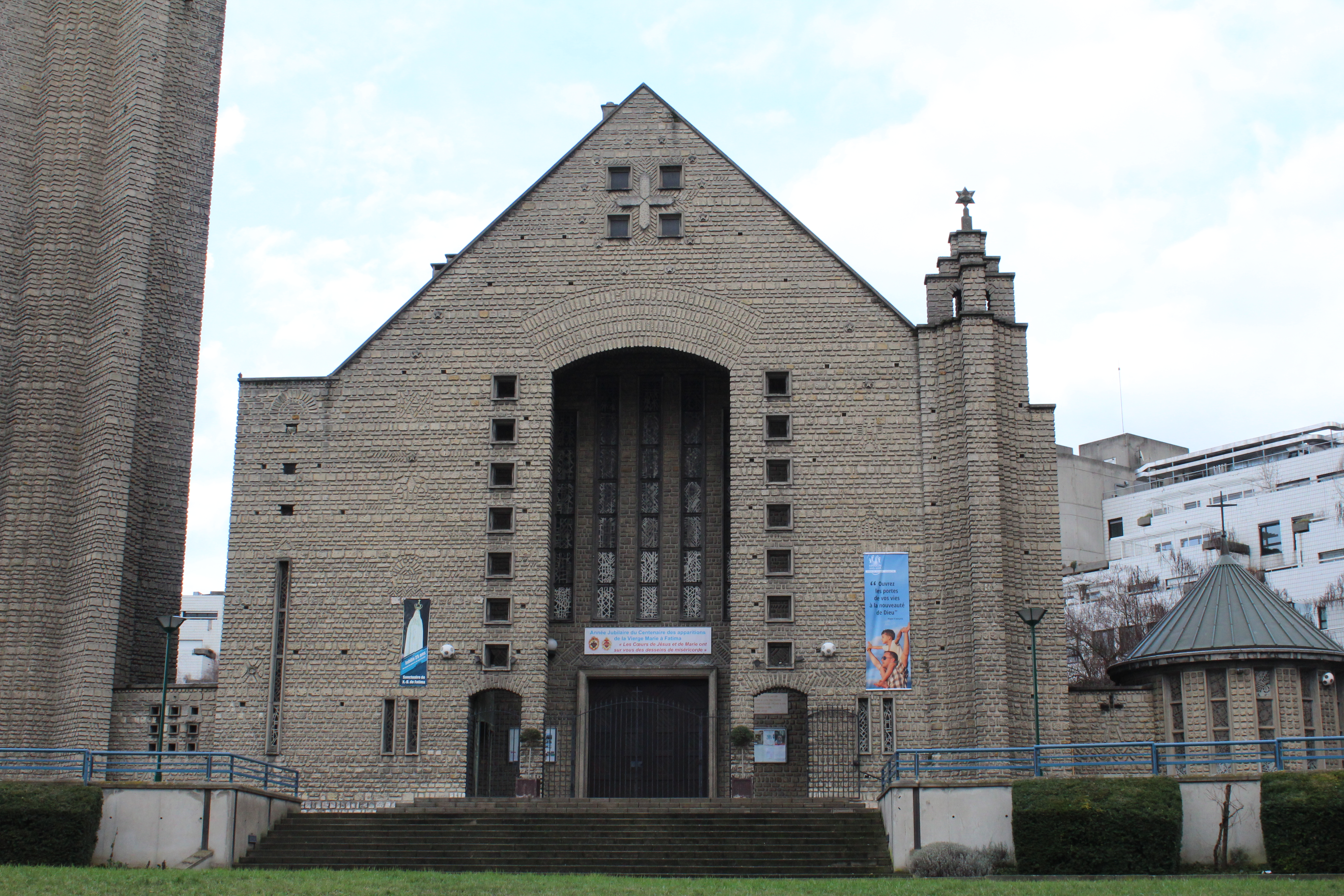
The facade

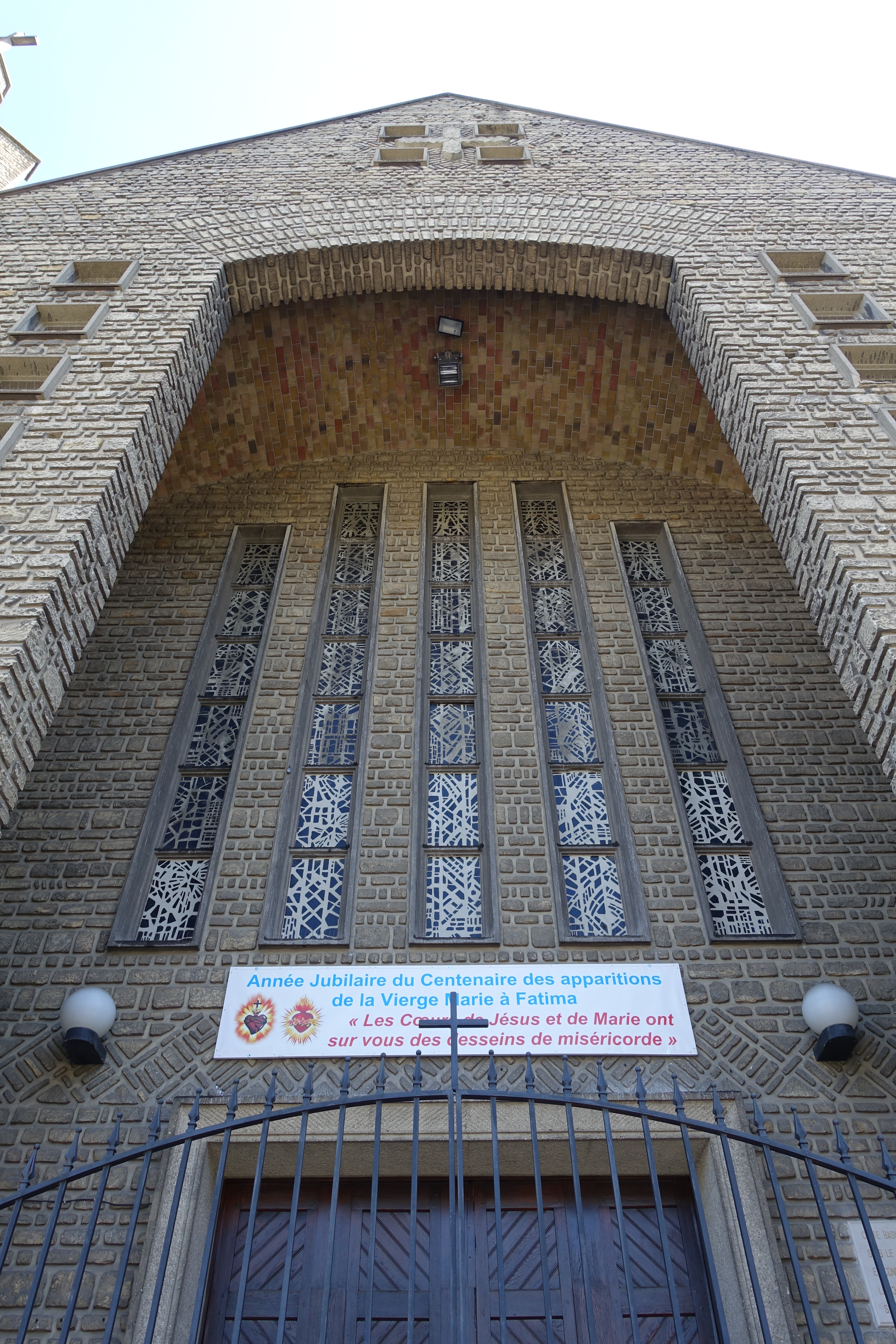
The portal

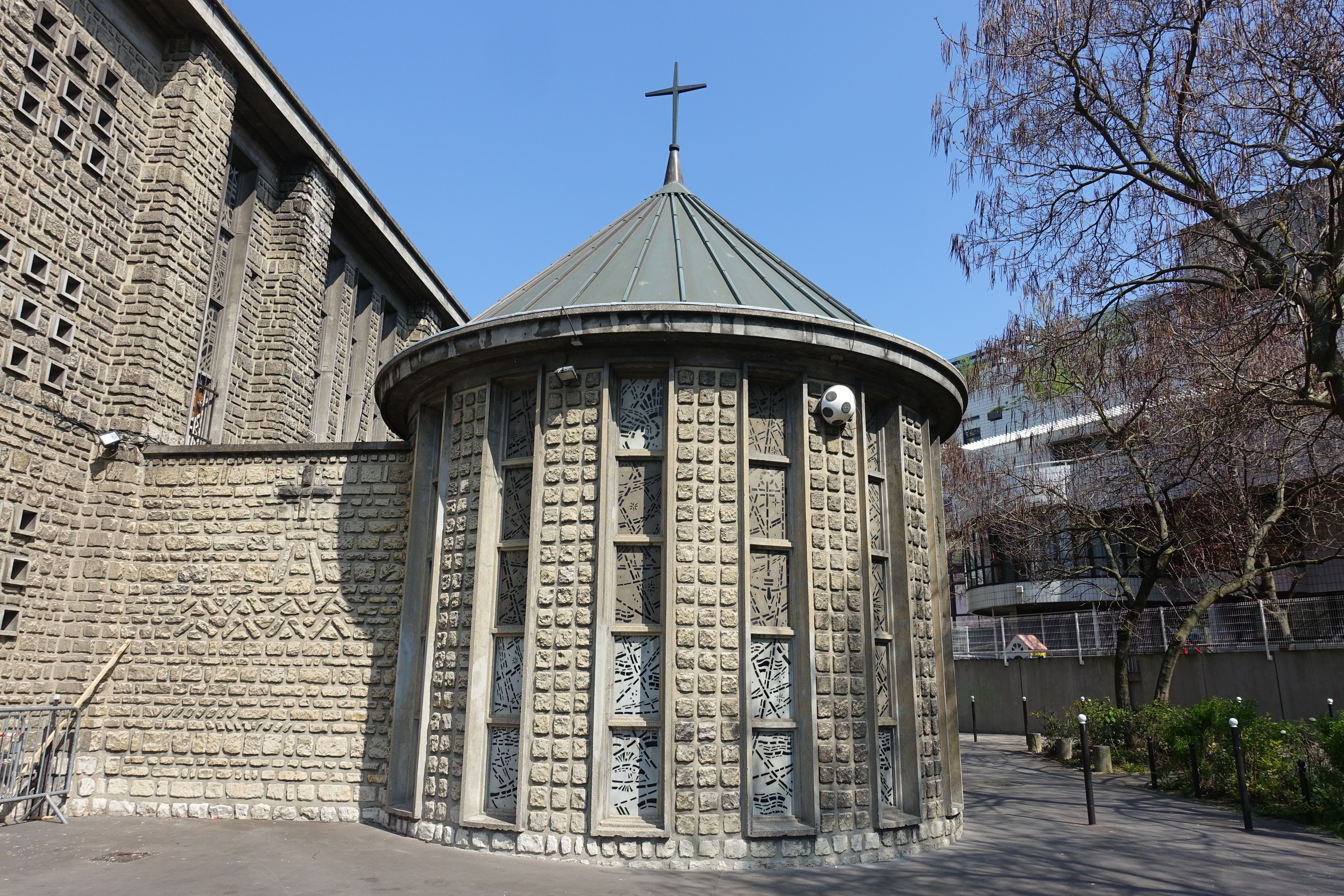
The baptistry, of concrete made to resemble stone

The church is sited on high ground near the periphery highway around Paris, between two traditional gateways to Paris, the Porte du Pere Saint Germain and the Porte de Lilas, The bell tower is fifty-four meters high, dominating the site, Balancing the bell tower on the other side of the facade is a smaller tower, the "Lanterne des Morts", or "Tower of the Dead". The brick and stone of the walls gives the church exterior a very distinctive texture.

The baptistry chapel is in a separate smaller structure on the right side, following the tradition of early Christian churches.

== Interior ==
The walls and ceiling of the interior of the church have an unusual design; the concrete has been given texture and colors giving the appearance of pieces of brick or stone, to harmonize with the abstract designs of the stained glass.

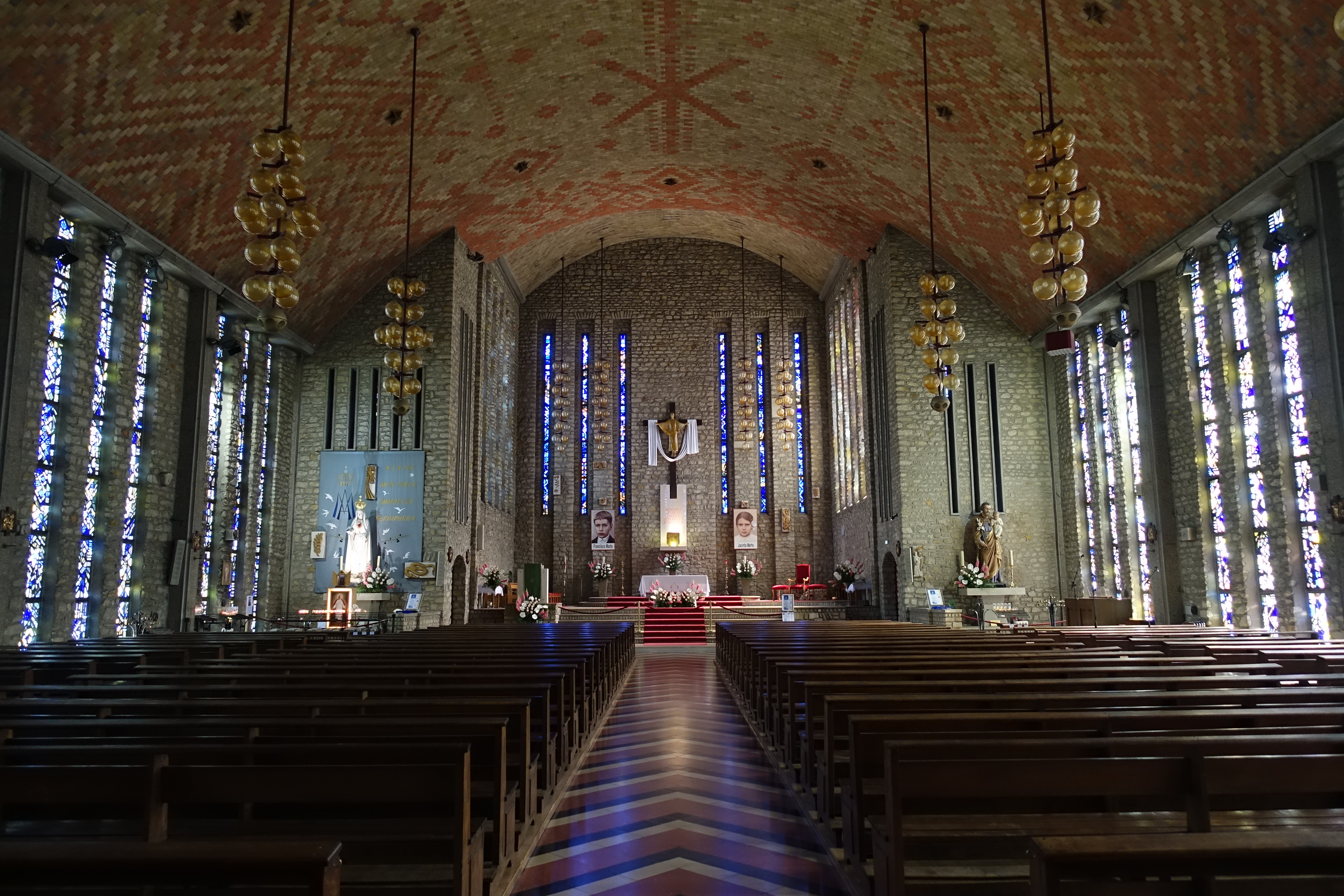
Nave looking toward the choir

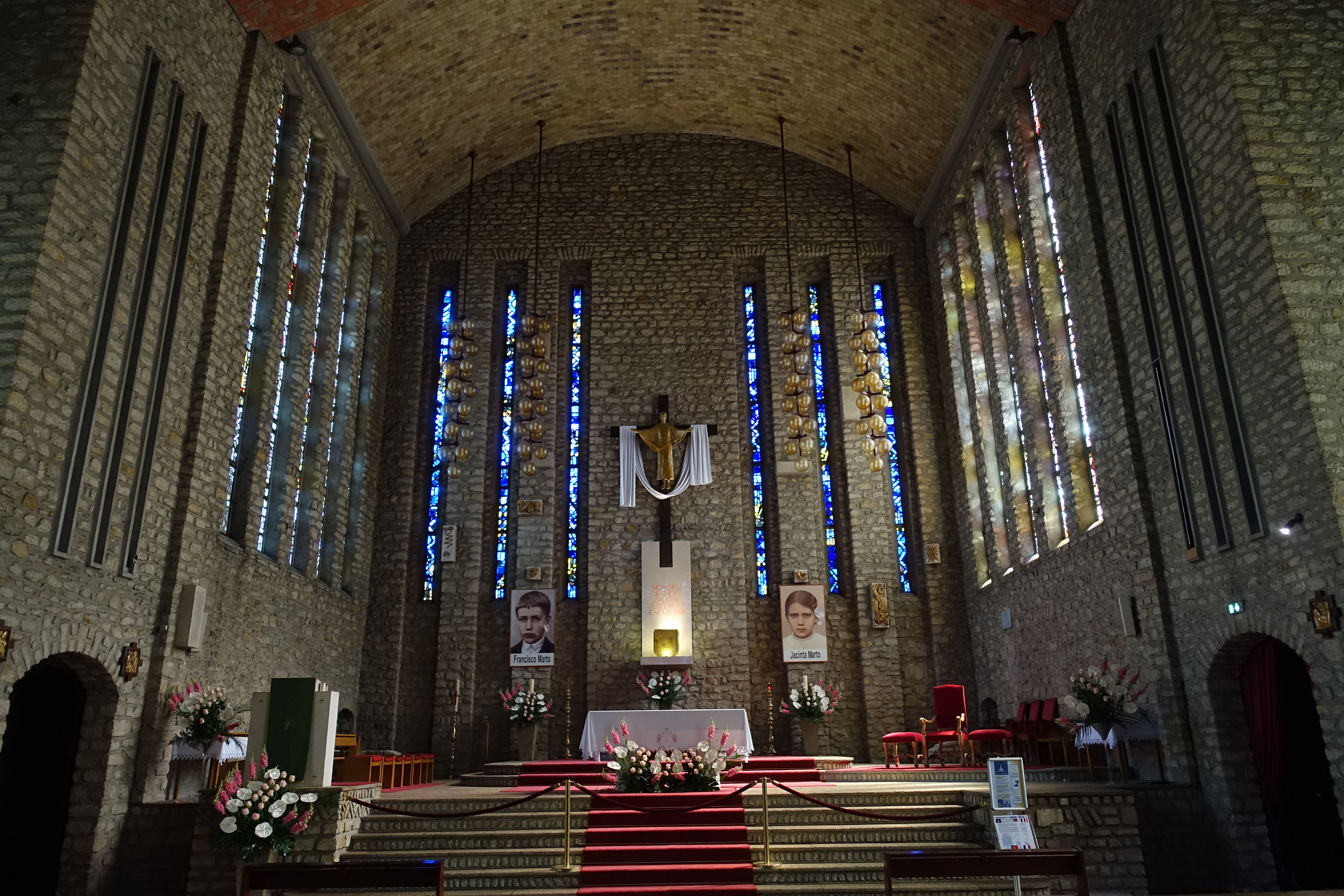
The Choir

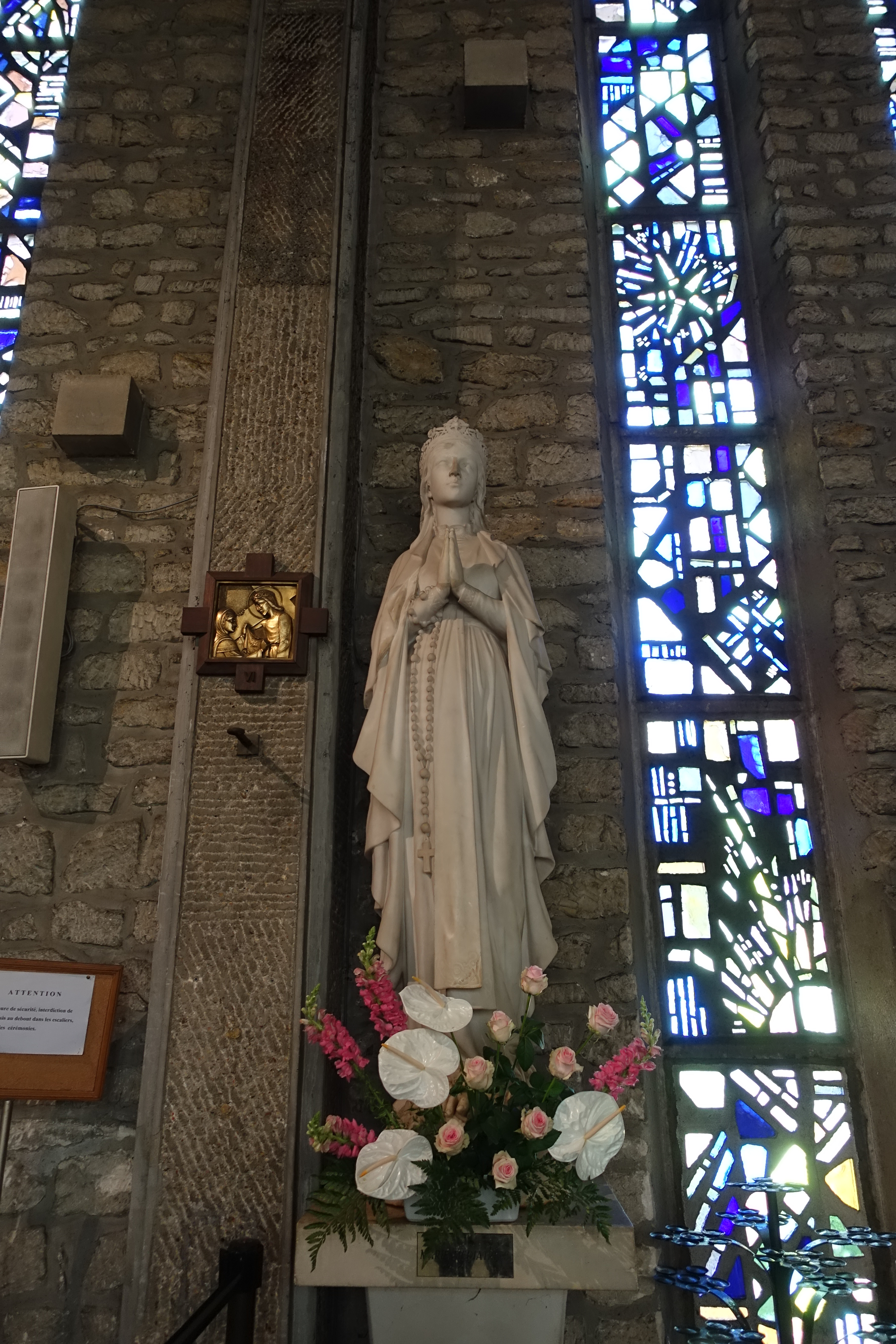
Sculpture of Marie Mediatrice

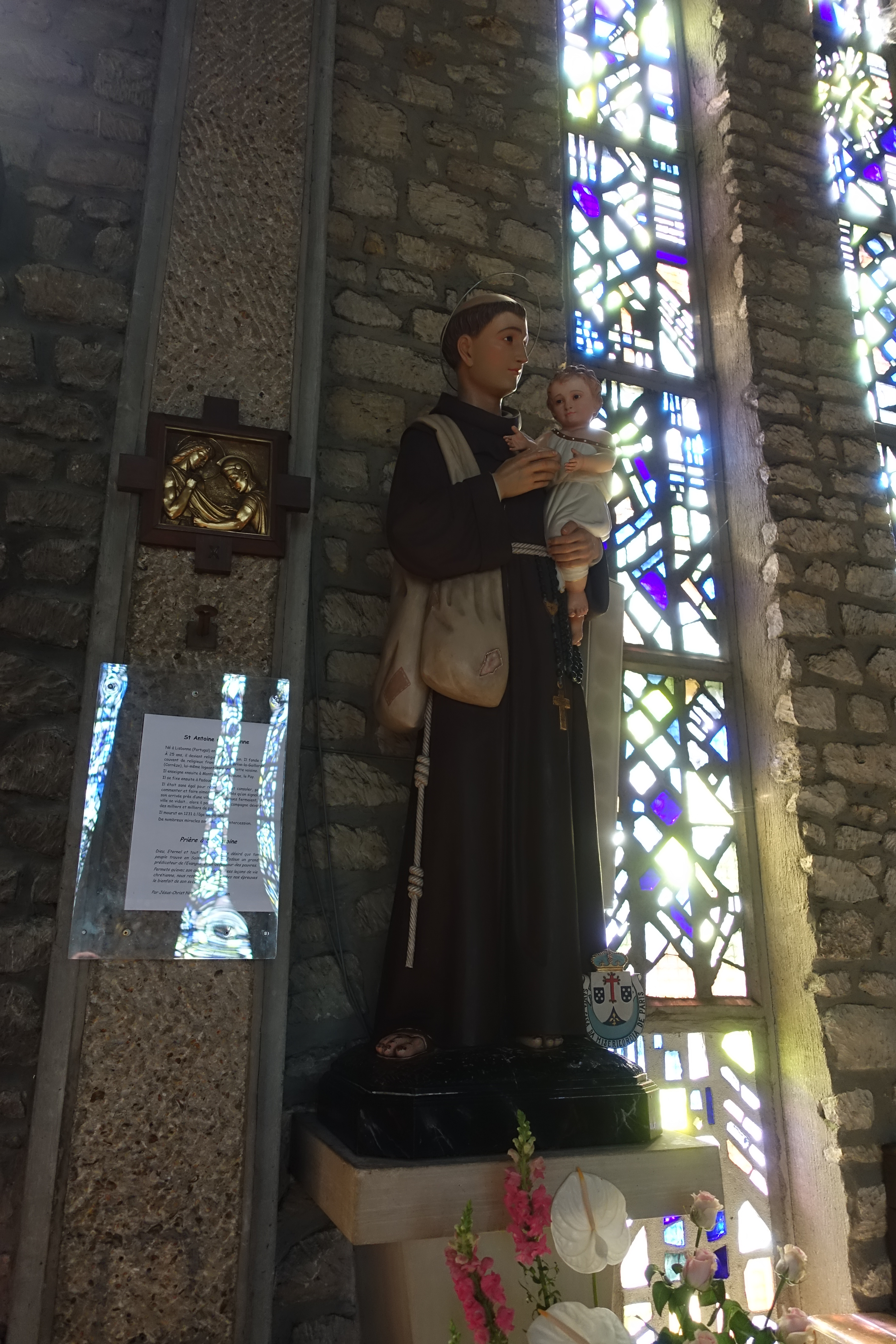
Sculpture of Saint Anthony of Lisbon

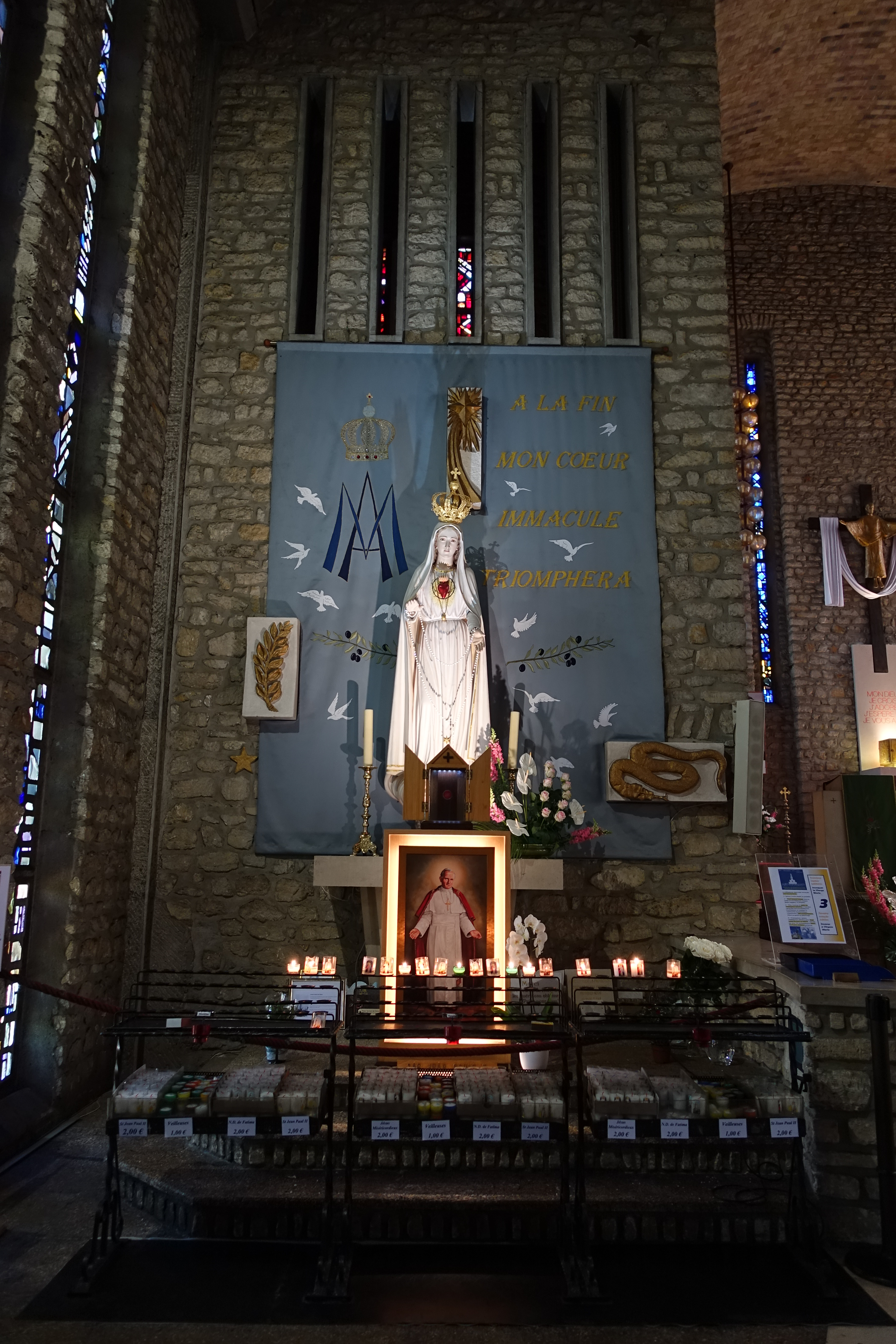
Chapel of the Virgin

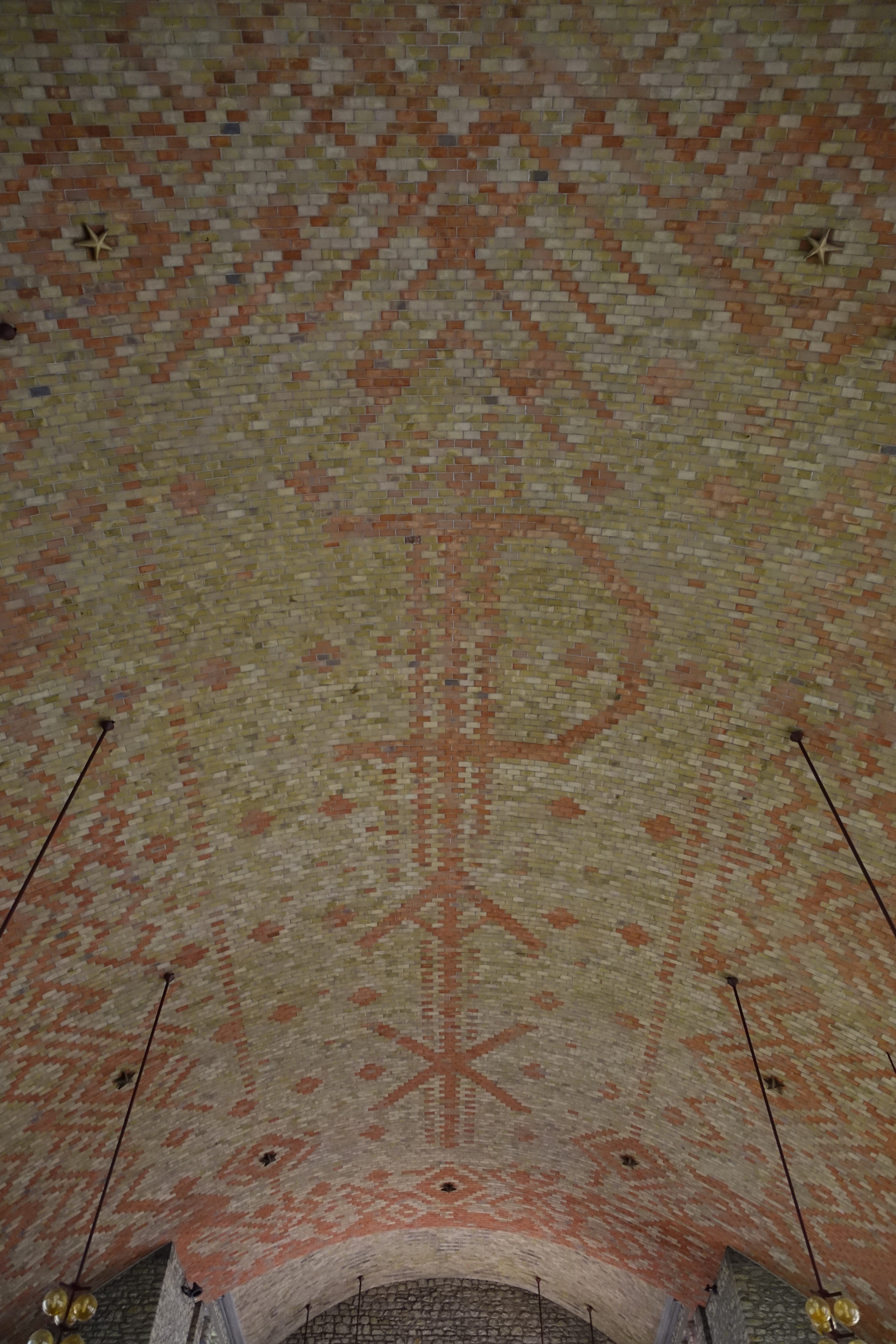
Design of the ceiling, concrete imitating stone

=== Stained glass ===
The stained glass, in non-figurative designs in tones of yellow and blue, was designed by Gabriel Loire (1904-1996).

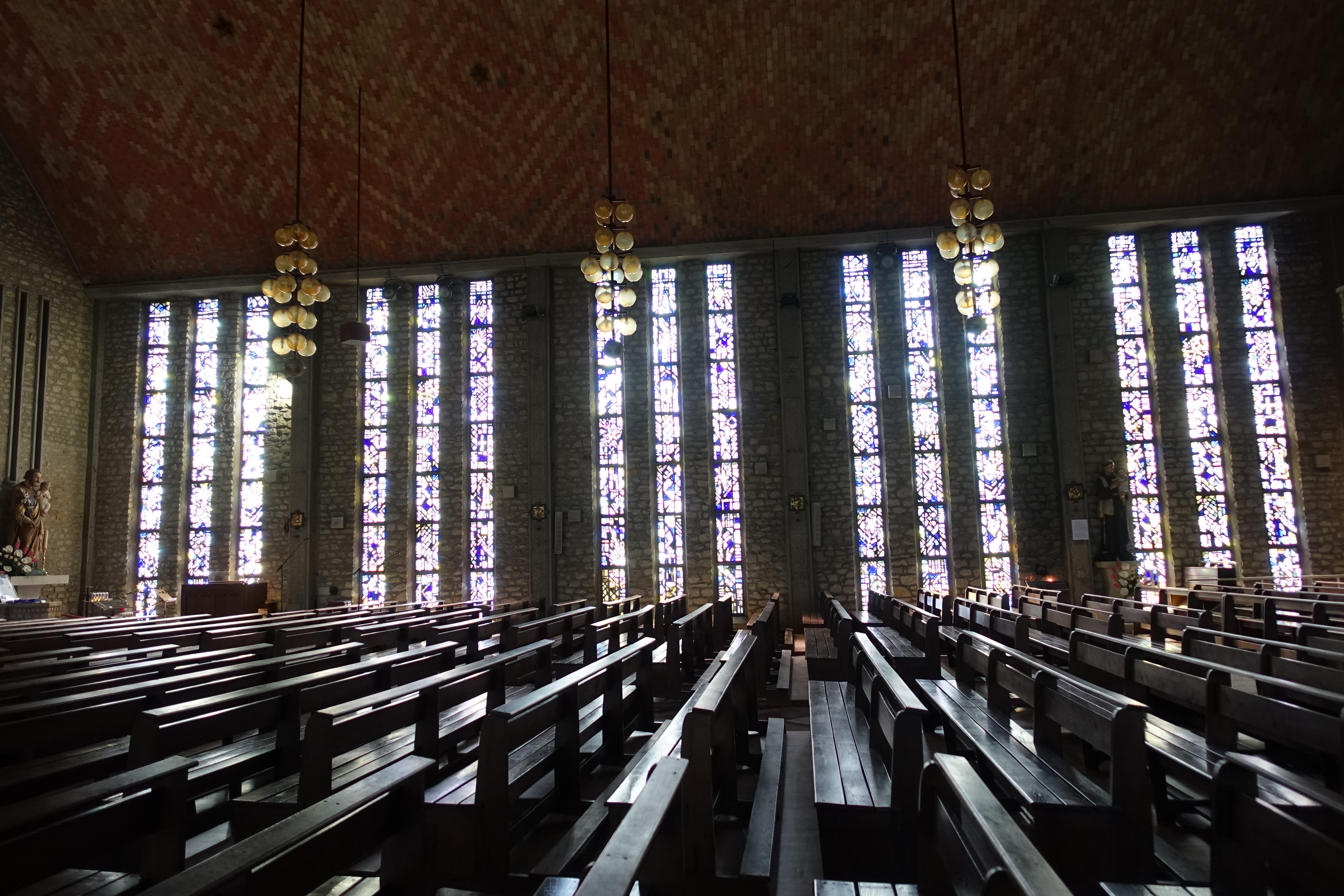
Windows of the nave

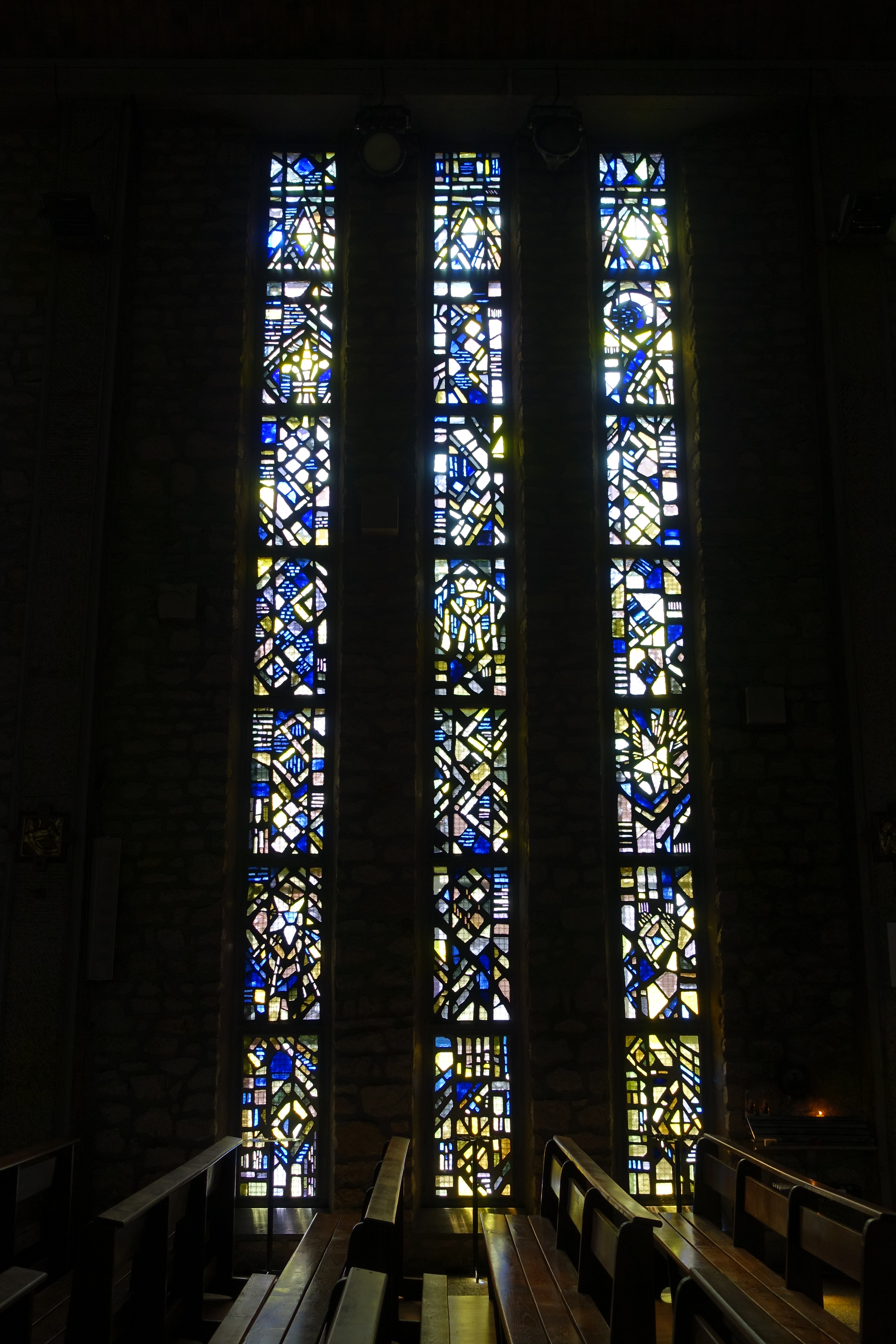
Windows in Notre-Dame de Fatima

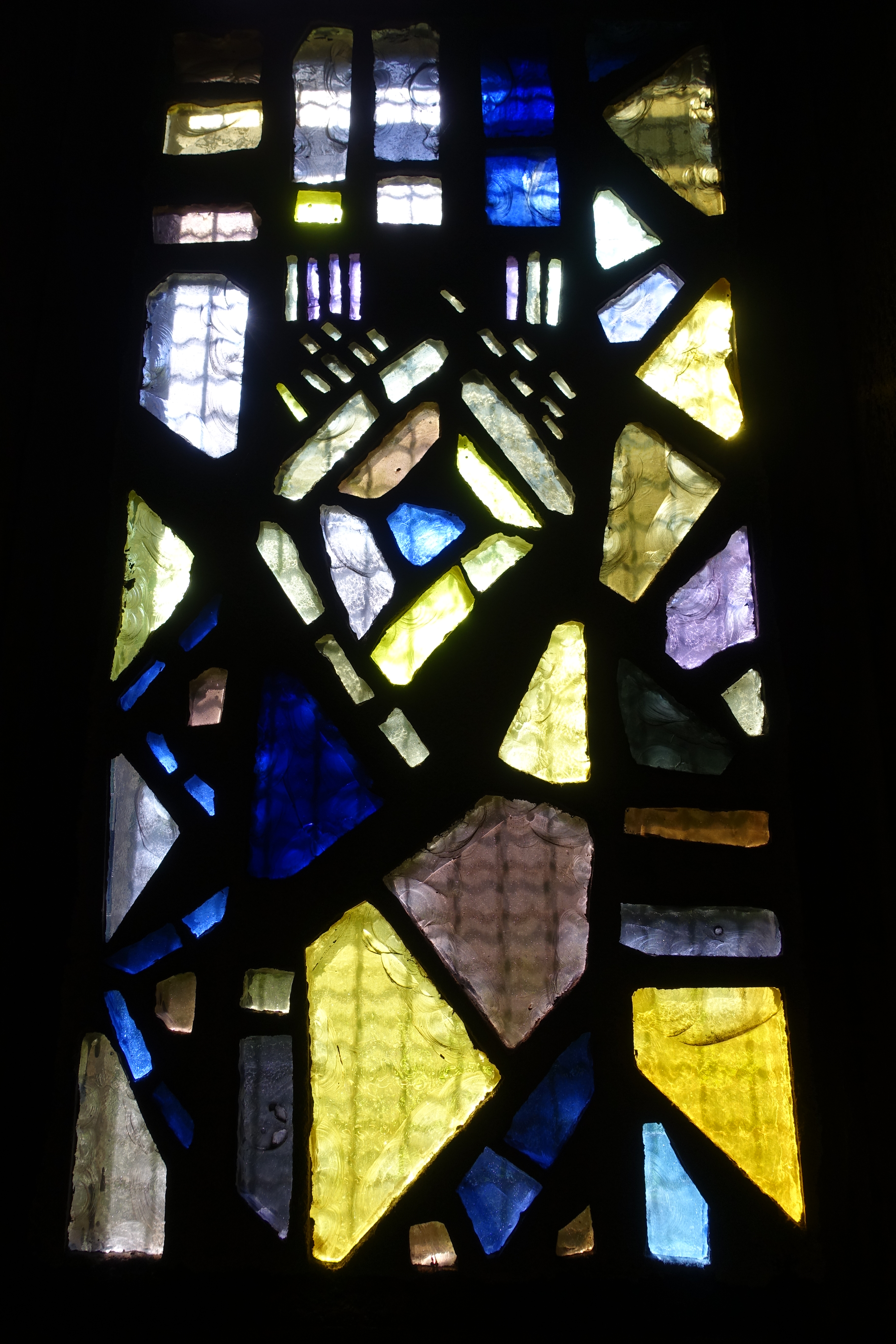
Detail of window

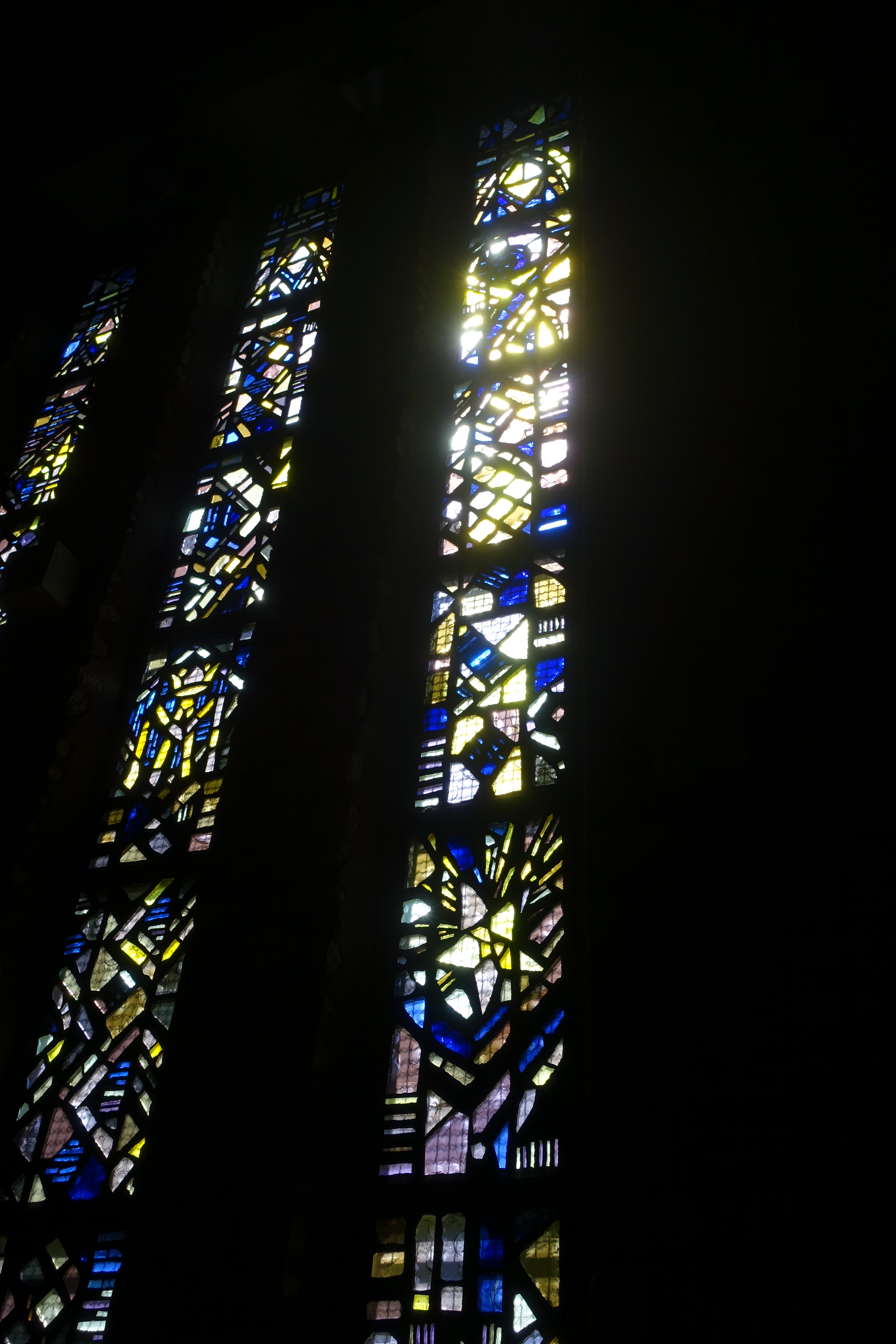
Windows in the nave

== Bibliography ==
- Aline Dumoulin, Paris d'église en église, Massin éditeur, 2008 (ISBN 978-2-7072-0583-4) (In French).
