= La Villette, Seine =

Coordinates: 48.89°N 2.38°E

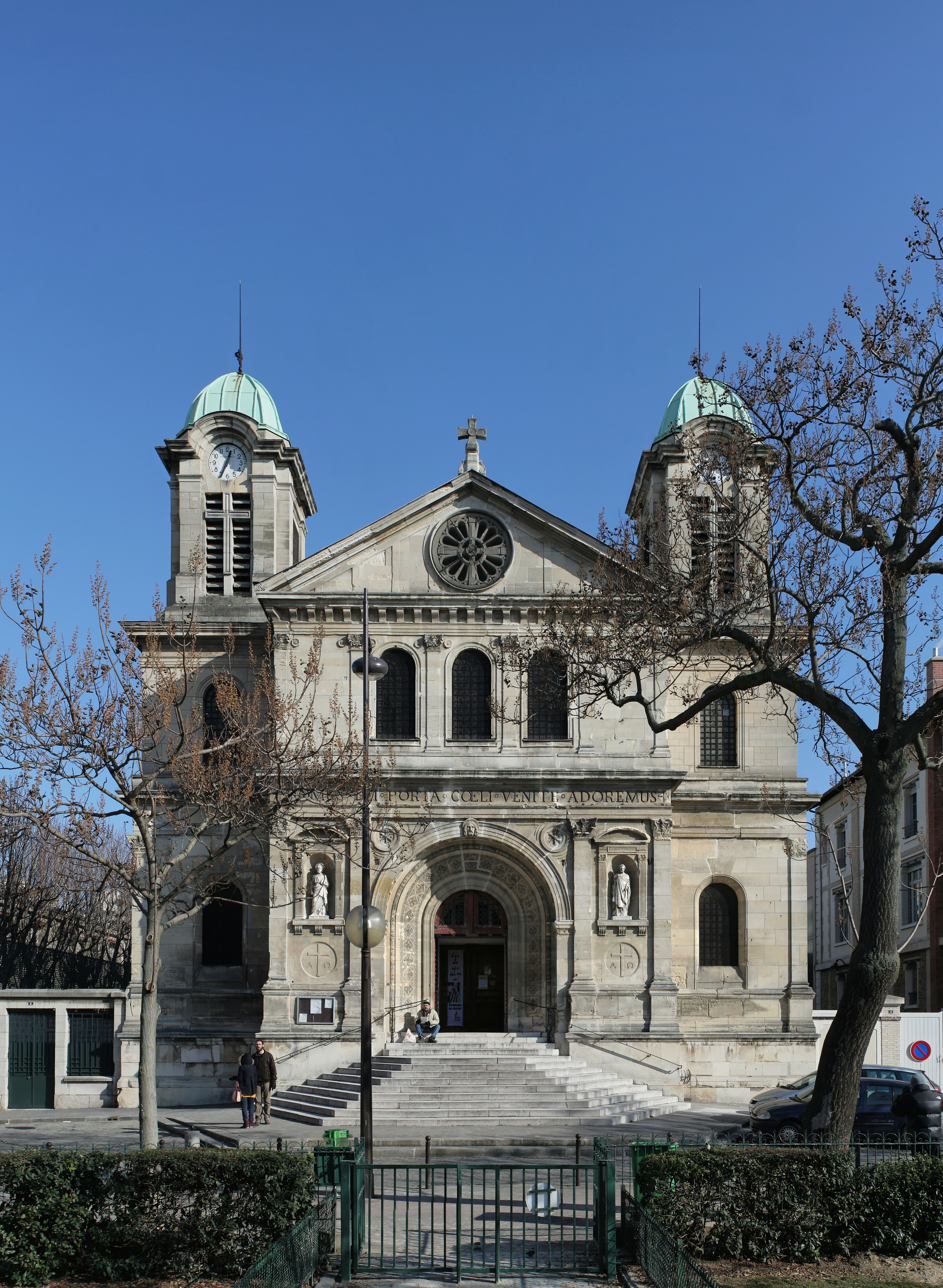
Église Saint-Jacques-et-Saint-Christophe de la Villette

La Villette (French pronunciation: [la vilɛt]) was a French commune (municipality) in the Seine département lying immediately north-east of Paris. It was one of four communes entirely annexed by the city of Paris in 1859. Its territory is now located in the 19th arrondissement, but a neighborhood has retained its name: the Quartier de la Villette and the Parc de la Villette.

A Gallo-Roman village stood here along the Roman road that led north from Lutetia. About 1198 the district was named the Villa Nova Sancti Lazari, in French Ville Neuf Saint-Ladre, the "new village of Saint-Ladre", which referred to the leper hospice dedicated to the lepers' patron Saint Lazare (Ladre); it became Villette-Saint-Ladre-lez-Paris in a document of 1426.

In 1790, the Constituent Assembly of Revolutionary France raised the hamlet to the status of a commune.
