= Belleville station (Paris Metro) =

Metro station in Paris, France

Belleville
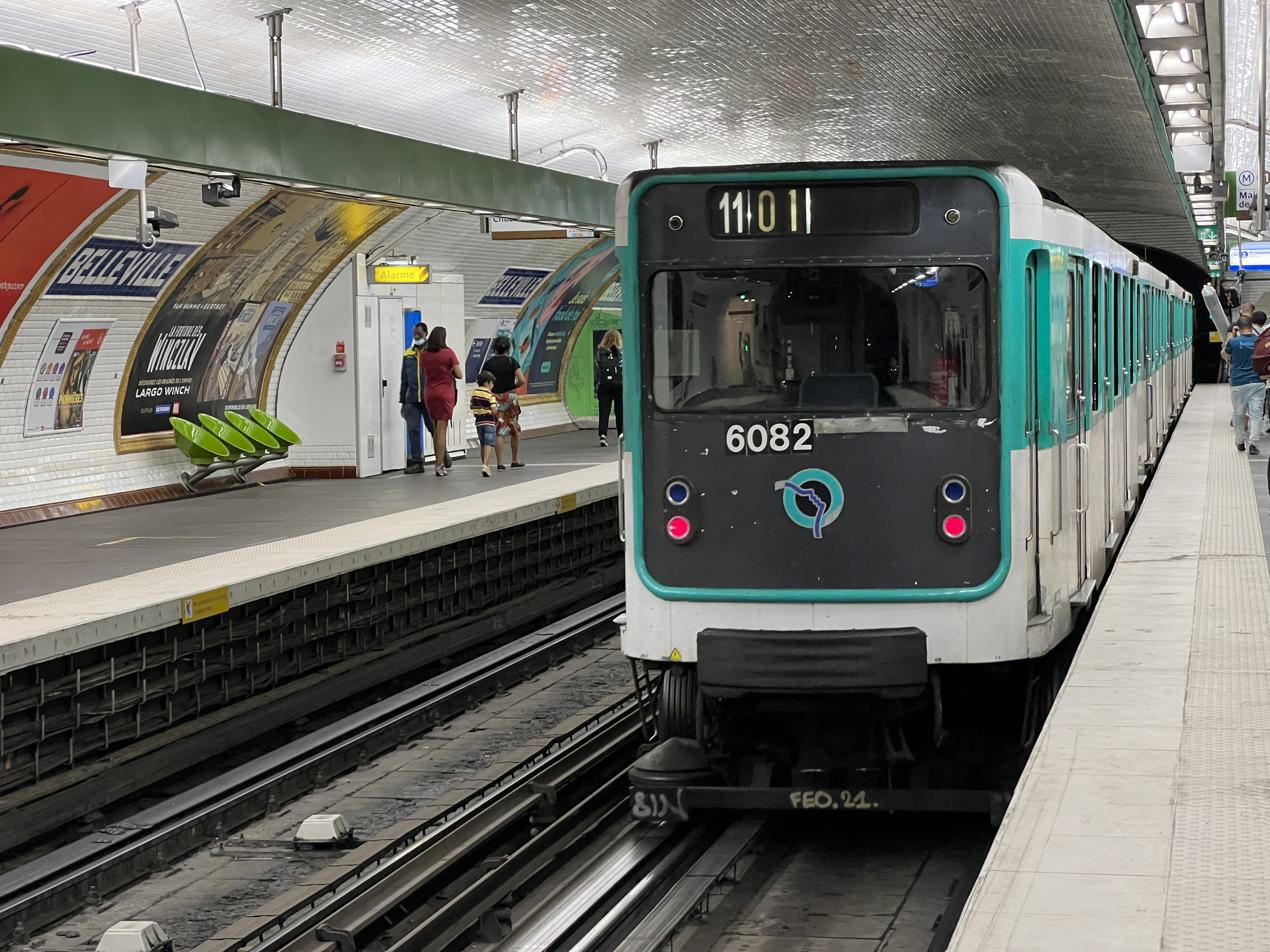
- Line 11 platforms

General information
- Location: 1, boul. de la Villette (two); 2, boul. de la Villette; 4, boul. de la Villette; 79, boul. de Belleville; 130, boul. de Belleville; 10th arrondissement of Paris; Île-de-France; France
- Coordinates: 48°52′19″N 2°22′37″E
- Owner: RATP
- Operator: RATP

Other information
- Fare zone: 1

History
- Opened: 31 January 1903 (Line 2); 28 April 1935 (Line 11)

Services
Preceding station	Paris Metro	Following station
Colonel Fabien towards Porte Dauphine	Line 2	Couronnes towards Nation
Goncourt towards Châtelet	Line 11	Pyrénées towards Rosny–Bois-Perrier
Route map
Line 2
Line 11
Location
- Location within Paris

Belleville (French pronunciation: [bɛlvil]) is a station on Paris Metro Line 2 and Line 11. The station is in the district of Belleville at the corner of the 10th, 11th, 19th and 20th arrondissements.

== Location ==
The station is located at the crossroads formed by Rue de Belleville, Boulevard de la Villette, Rue du Faubourg-du-Temple and Boulevard de Belleville, with the platforms positioned:

- on line 2, approximately a north-west / south-east axis under the start of Boulevard de la Villette, between the Couronnes and Colonel Fabien metro stations;
- on line 11, approximately a northeast / southwest axis under the end of Rue du Faubourg-du-Temple, between Goncourt and Pyrénées metro stations.

== History ==
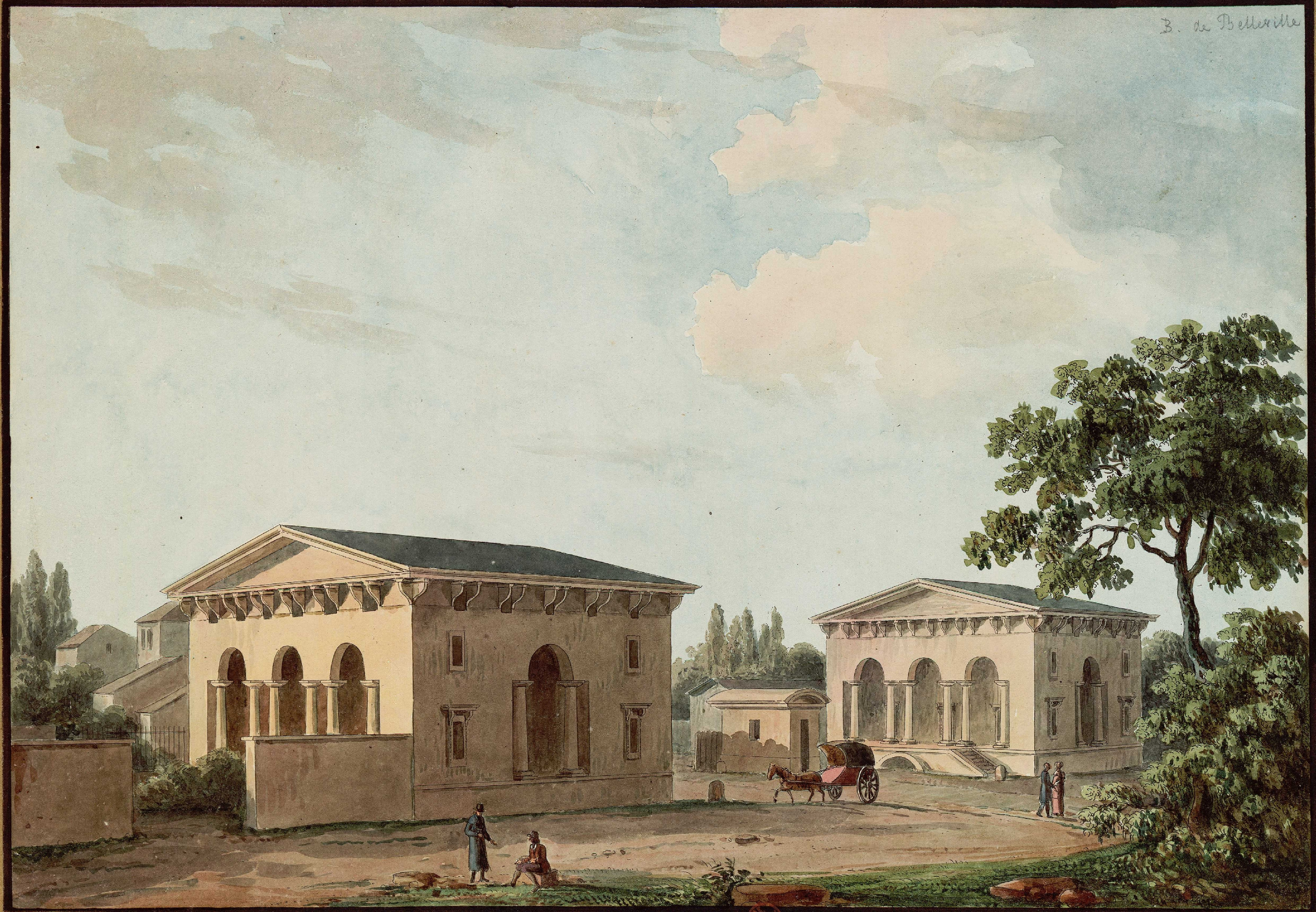
The former Barrière de Belleville, part of the Wall of the Farmers-General

The station was opened on 31 January 1903 as part of the extension of line 2 from Anvers to Bagnolet (now called Alexandre Dumas). The line 11 platforms opened as part of the original section of the line from Châtelet to Porte des Lilas on 28 April 1935. The station is named after the commune of Belleville that was annexed by Paris in 1860. It was the location of the Barrière de Belleville, a gate built for the collection of taxation as part of the Wall of the Farmers-General; the gate was built between 1784 and 1788 and demolished during the 19th century.

Like a third of the stations in the network, between 1974 and 1984, the platforms were modernised in Andreu-Motte style, in orange for line 2 and green for line 11.

As part of RATP's Renouveau du métro program, its corridors were renovated on 29 July 2005.

In 2015, local elected officials proposed to change the station's name to Belleville–Commune de Paris 1871, commemorating the area as the last redoubt of the Paris Commune.

Since 2020, as part of the extension of line 11 to Rosny-sous-Bois, three new entrances have been put into service: no. 7 and no. 9 on 17 September and no. 8 at the end of that year.

In 2020, with the COVID-19 crisis, 5,680,933 passengers entered this station, which placed it in twelfth position among metro stations for its use.

== Passenger services ==
=== Access ===
The station has nine entrances:

- entrance 1 - Boulevard de Belleville, consisting of a fixed staircase, leading to the right side no. 130-132 of the boulevard;
- entrance 2 - Rue de Belleville, also made up of a fixed staircase, facing no. 2 on Boulevard de la Villette;
- entrance 3 - Boulevard de la Villette, made up of an ascending escalator allowing exit only, located to the right of no. 4 of this boulevard;
- entrance 4 - Terre-plein central du boulevard de la Villette, made up of a fixed staircase adorned with a Dervaux candelabra, leading to said central reservation facing no. 1, 2 and 3 of this boulevard;
- entrance 5 - Rue du Faubourg-du-Temple, also made up of a fixed staircase decorated with a Dervaux mast, located to the right of no. 1 on Boulevard de la Villette;
- entrance 6 - Rue Louis-Bonnet, consisting of a fixed staircase fitted with a Dervaux candelabra, located at the corner formed by Rue Faubourg-du-Temple and Louis-Bonnet, facing no. 79 of the Boulevard de Belleville;
- entrance 7 - Rue de la Presentation, consisting of a fixed staircase with a Dervaux candelabra, that opened in 2020, located at the corner of said street and Rue du Faubourg-du-Temple; this access is only connected to the platform bound for the Mairie des Lilas on line 11;
- entrance 8 - Rue de l'Orillon, consisting of an escalator going up only, allowing exit from the platform in the direction of Mairie des Lilas, located to the right of no. 8 of Rue de la Presentation;
- entrance 9 - Cour de la Grâce-de-Dieu, consisting of a fixed staircase allowing only an exit from the platform, direction Châtelet, located to the right of no. 127 of the street Rue du Faubourg-du-Temple.

=== Station layout ===
G	Street Level	Exit/Entrance
B1	Mezzanine	to Exits/Entrances
B2	Side platform, doors will open on the right
B2	Westbound	← toward Porte Dauphine (Colonel Fabien)
B2	Eastbound	toward Nation (Couronnes) →
B2	Side platform, doors will open on the right
B3	Side platform, doors will open on the right
B3	Southbound	← toward Châtelet (Goncourt)
B3	Northbound	toward Rosny–Bois-Perrier (Pyrénées) →
B3	Side platform, doors will open on the right

=== Platforms ===
The platforms of the two lines are of a standard configuration. There are two per stopping points, separated by the metro tracks located in the centre and the vault is elliptical.

Line 2 station is fitted out in the Andreu-Motte style with two light canopies and orange Motte seats. The bevelled white ceramic tiles cover the walls, the tunnel exits and the vault. The advertising frames are metallic and the name of the station is written in Parisine font on enamelled plaques.

Line 11 station is also decorated in the Andreu-Motte style with two light canopies and green Motte seats. As on the platforms of line 2, the white ceramic tiles cover the walls, the tunnel exits and the vault. In contrast, the advertising frames are honey-colored earthenware and the name of the station is also written on the earthenware in the style of the original CMP.

=== Bus connections ===
The station is served by lines 20 and 71 of the RATP bus network, and, at night, by lines N12 and N23 of the Noctilien network.

== Modernisation ==
As part of the line 11 extension project, and to meet the station's evacuation standards, plans were created for new accesses at the western end of the platforms, leading to Rue de la Présentation.

== Gallery ==
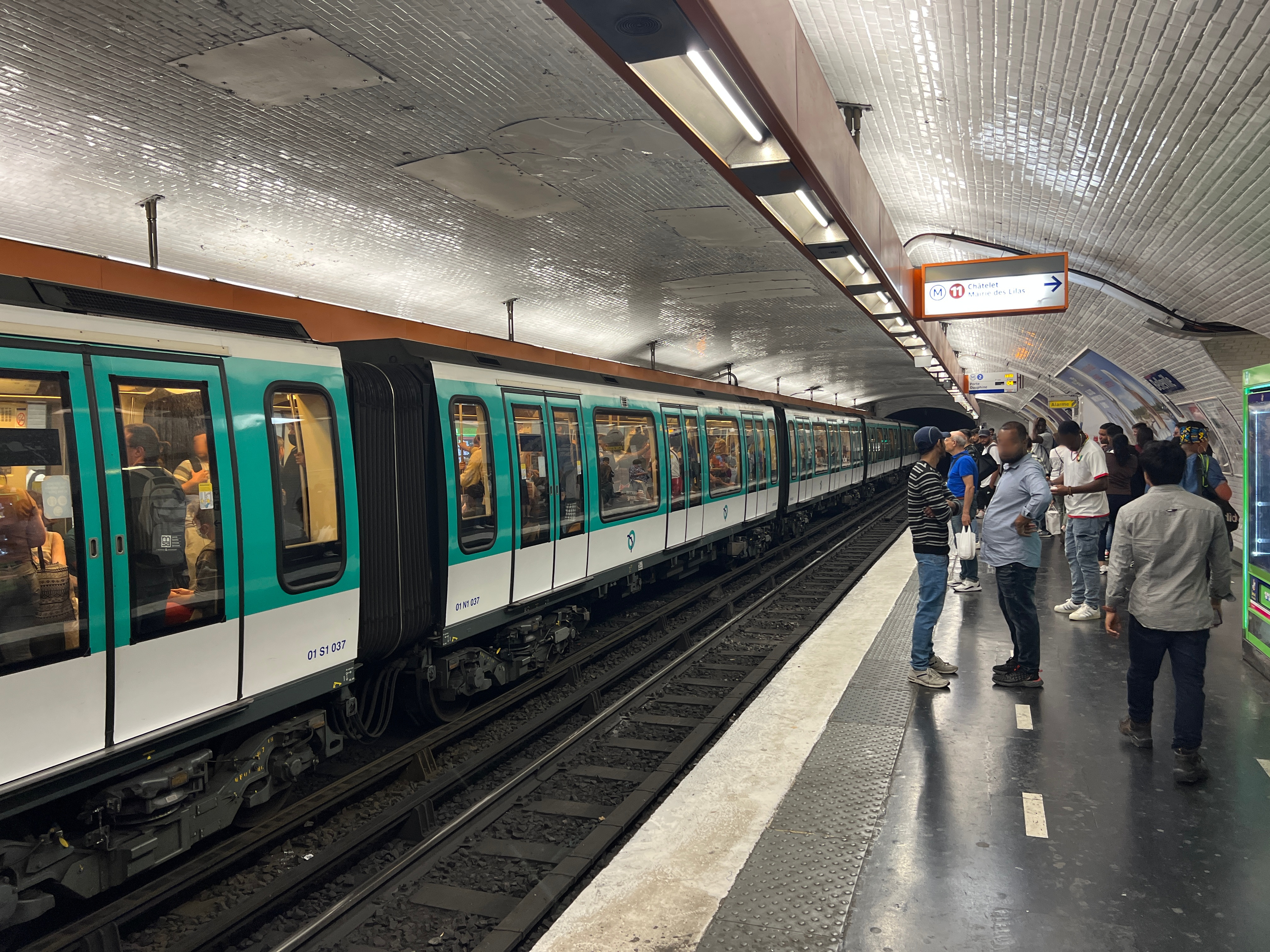
Line 2 platforms
