= Jourdain station =

Metro station in Paris, France

Jourdain
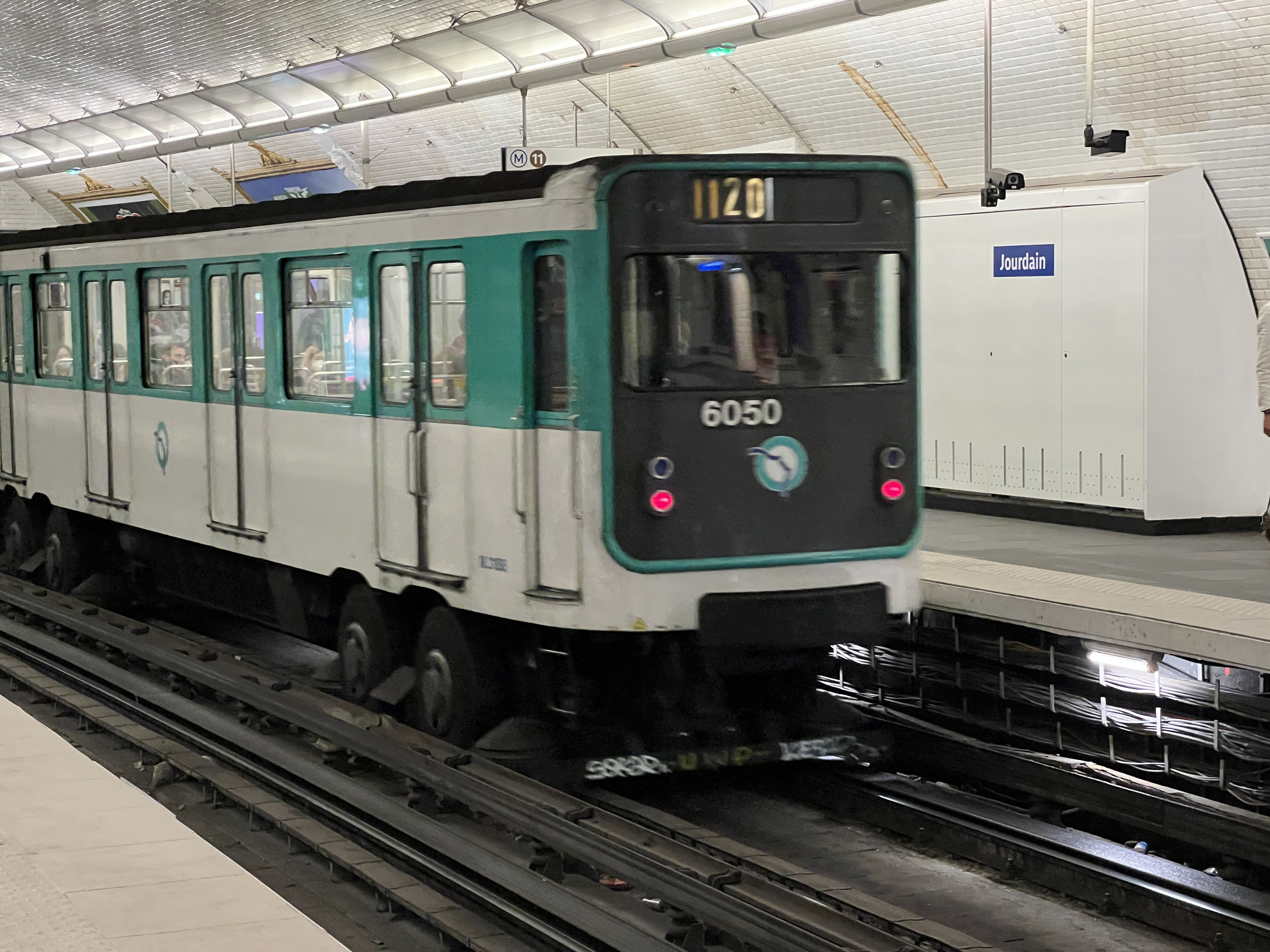
- MP 59 at Jourdain

General information
- Location: 19th arrondissement of Paris; Île-de-France; France
- Coordinates: 48°52′31″N 2°23′22″E
- System: Paris Métro station
- Owner: RATP
- Operator: RATP
- Line: Paris Metro Paris Metro Line 11
- Platforms: 2 (2 side platforms)
- Tracks: 2

Other information
- Station code: 23-14
- Fare zone: 1

History
- Opened: April 28, 1935

Passengers
- 1,683,473 (2020)

Services
| Preceding station | Paris Metro | Following station |
|---|---|---|
| Pyrénées towards Châtelet | Line 11 | Place des Fêtes towards Rosny–Bois-Perrier |
Location
- Location within Paris

Jourdain (French pronunciation: [ʒuʁdɛ̃]) is a station on Line 11 of the Paris Métro in the 19th and 20th arrondissements. It is named after the nearby rue du Jourdain, referring to a nearby church dedicated to Saint John the Baptist, who baptised Jesus in the Jordan River.

== History ==
The station opened as part of the original section of the line from Châtelet to Porte des Lilas on 28 April 1935.

As part of modernization works for the extension of the line to Rosny–Bois-Perrier in 2023 for the Grand Paris Express, the station will be closed from 2 February 2021 to 12 April 2021 to raise its platform levels and its surface tiled to accommodate the new rolling stock that will be used (MP 14) to accommodate the expected increase passengers and to improve the station's accessibility. An additional entrance was also added in January 2022 from the eastern end of the platforms to allow passengers to enter from both ends of the platforms.

In 2019, the station was used by 3,029,314 passengers, making it the 171st busiest of the Métro network out of 302 stations.

In 2020, the station was used by 1,683,473 passengers amidst the COVID-19 pandemic, making it the 151st busiest of the Métro network out of 305 stations.

== Passenger services ==
=== Access ===
The station has 3 entrances:

- Entrance 1: rue du Jourdain
- Entrance 2: rue Lassus
- Entrance 3: rue de Belleville

=== Station layout ===
Street Level
| B1 | Mezzanine |
| Line 11 platforms | Side platform, doors will open on the right |
| Line 11 platforms | Southbound | ← toward Châtelet (Pyrénées) |
| Line 11 platforms | Northbound | toward Rosny–Bois-Perrier (Place des Fêtes) → |
| Line 11 platforms | Side platform, doors will open on the right |

=== Platforms ===
Jourdain has a standard configuration with 2 tracks surrounded by 2 side platforms.

=== Other connections ===
The station is also served by line 20 of the RATP bus network, and at night, by lines N12 and N23 of the Noctilien bus network.

== Gallery ==
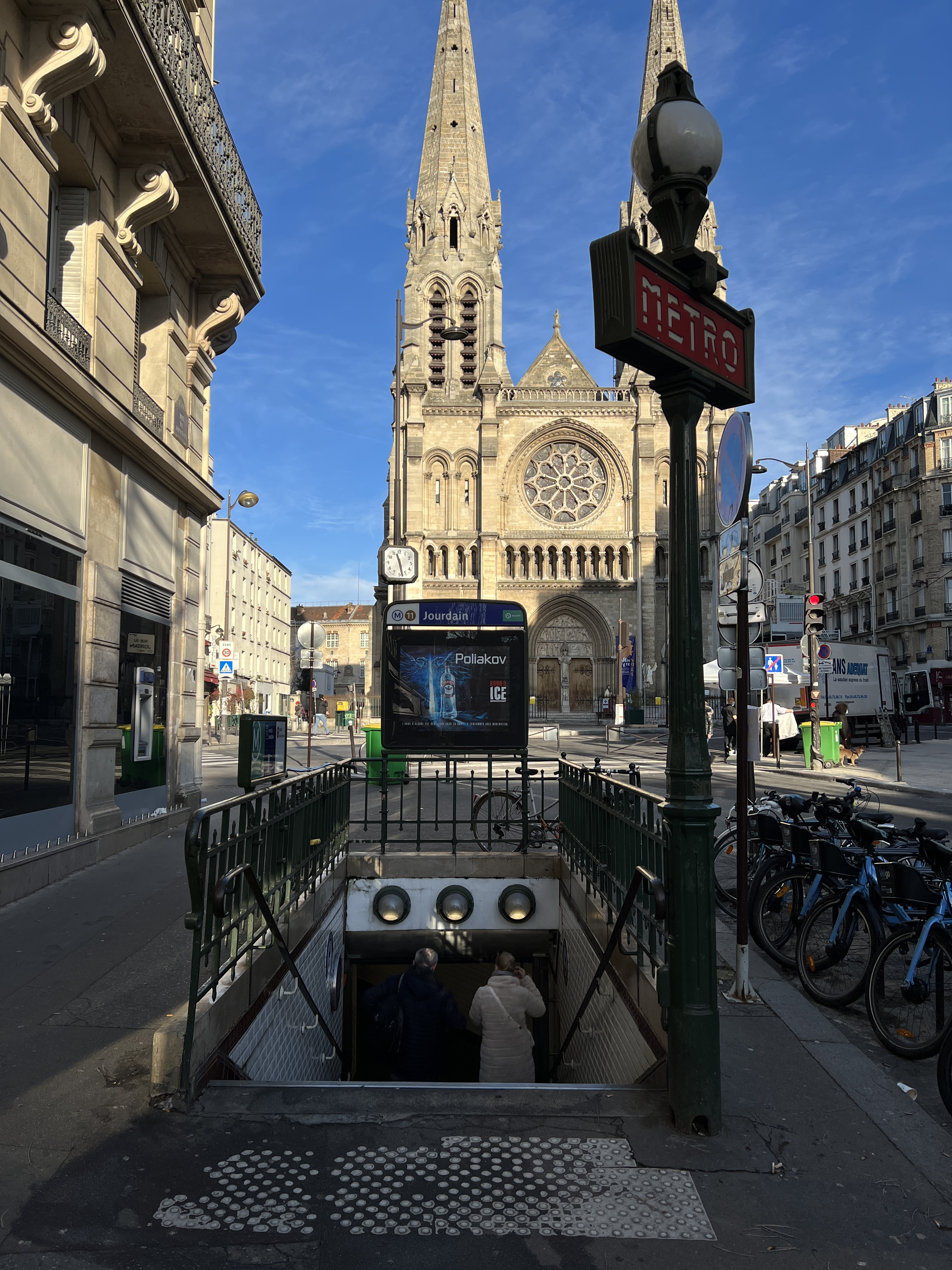
Entrance 1

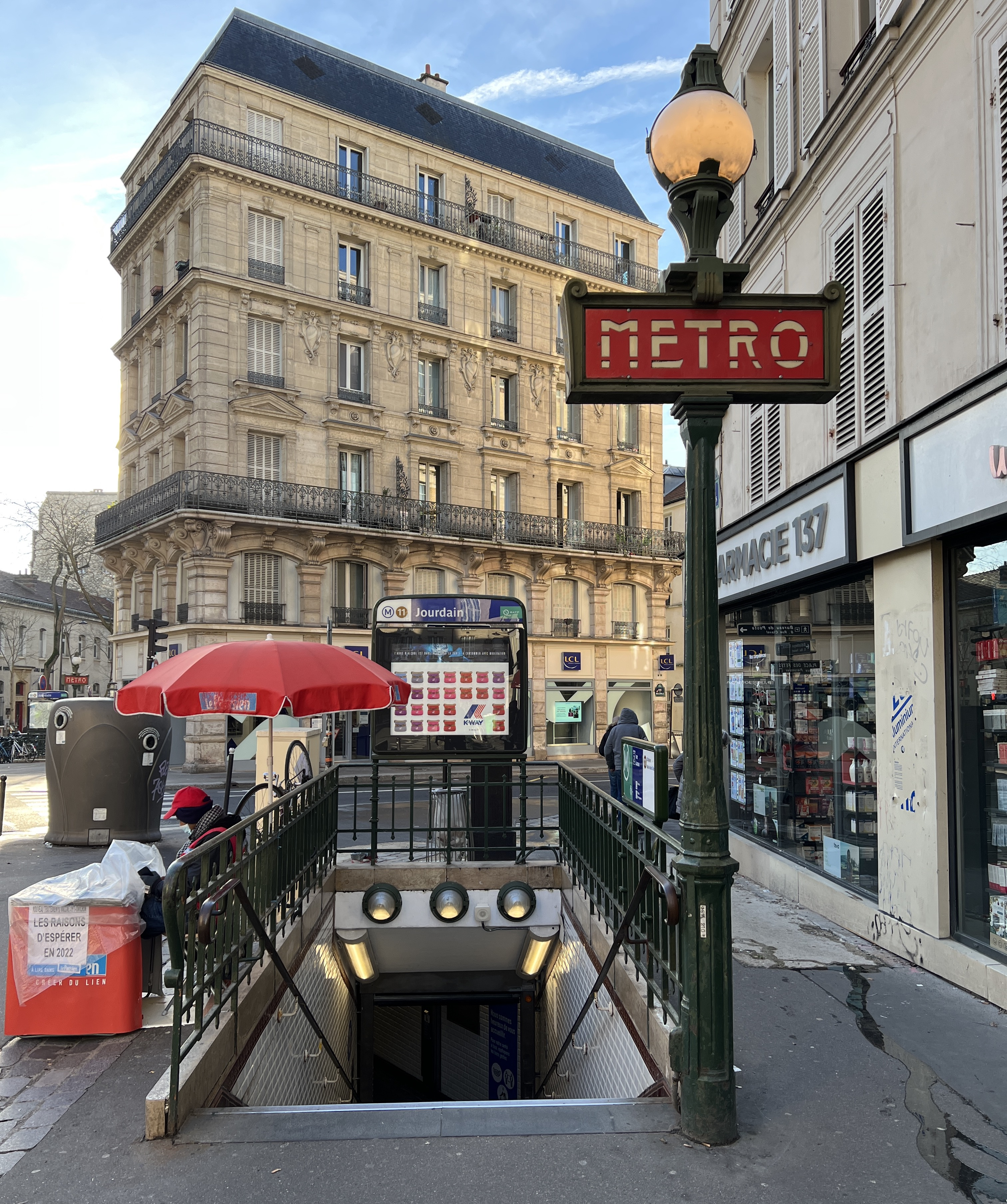
Entrance 2

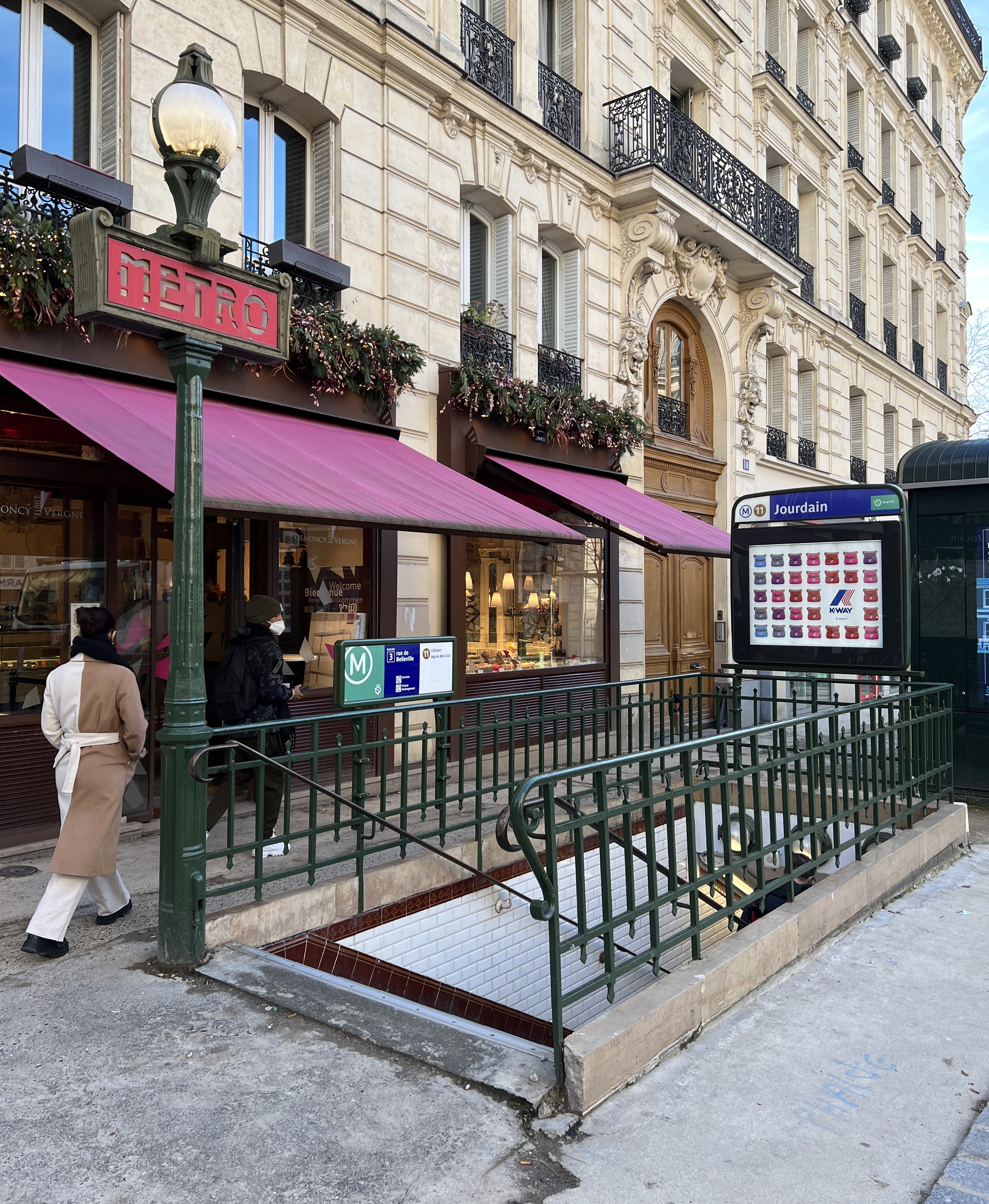
Entrance 3

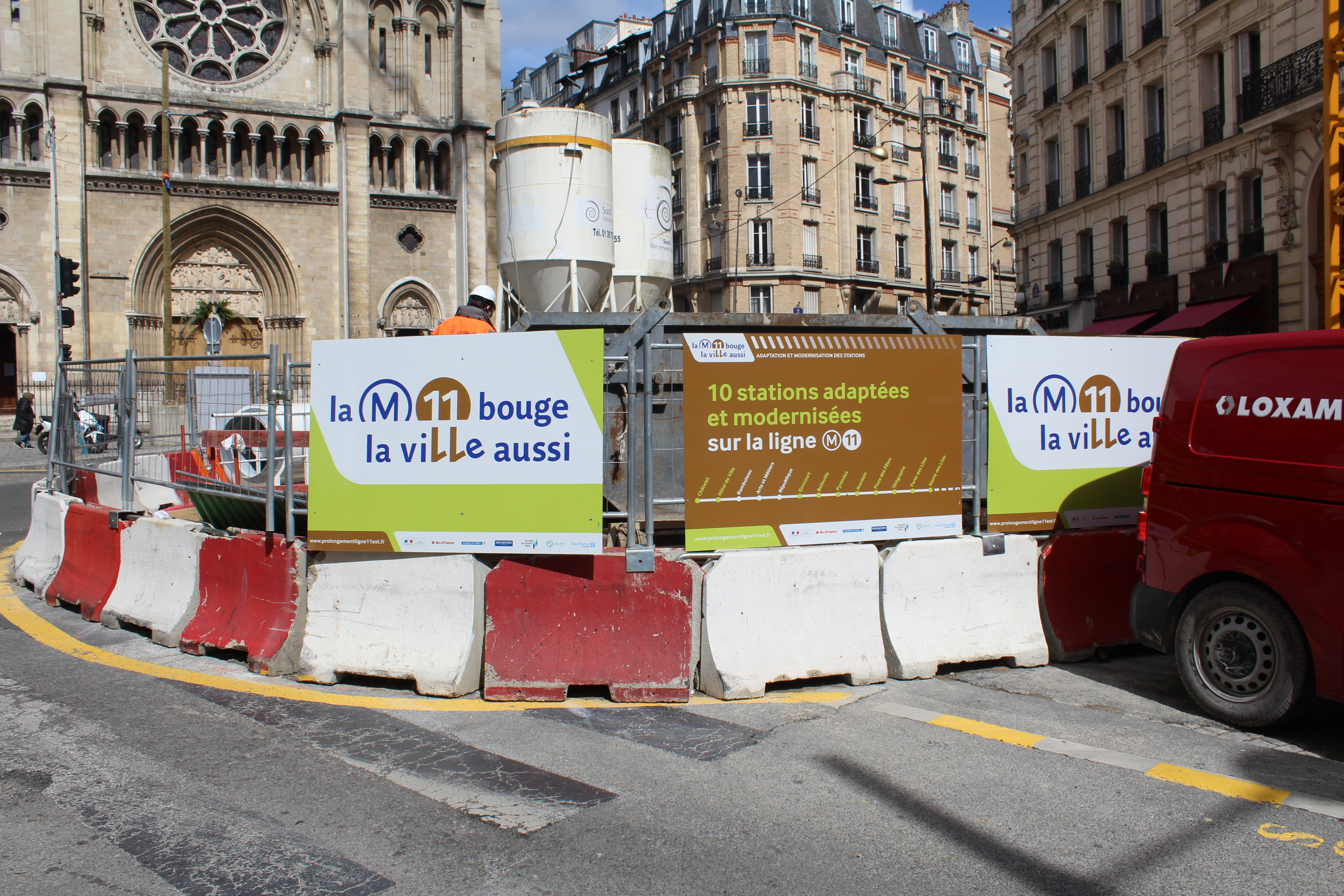
Construction of a new entrance
