= Belleville, Paris =

Neighbourhood of Paris, France

Coordinates: 48°52′26″N 2°23′07″E

Location of Belleville in Paris

Belleville (French pronunciation: [bɛlvil]) is a neighbourhood of Paris, France, parts of which lie in four different arrondissements. The major portion of Belleville straddles the borderline between the 20th arrondissement and the 19th along its main street, the Rue de Belleville. The remainder lies in the 10th and 11th arrondissements.

It was once the independent commune (municipality) of Belleville which was annexed by the City of Paris in 1860 and divided between two arrondissements. Geographically, the neighborhood is situated on and around a hill which ties with Montmartre as the highest in Paris. The name Belleville literally means "beautiful town".

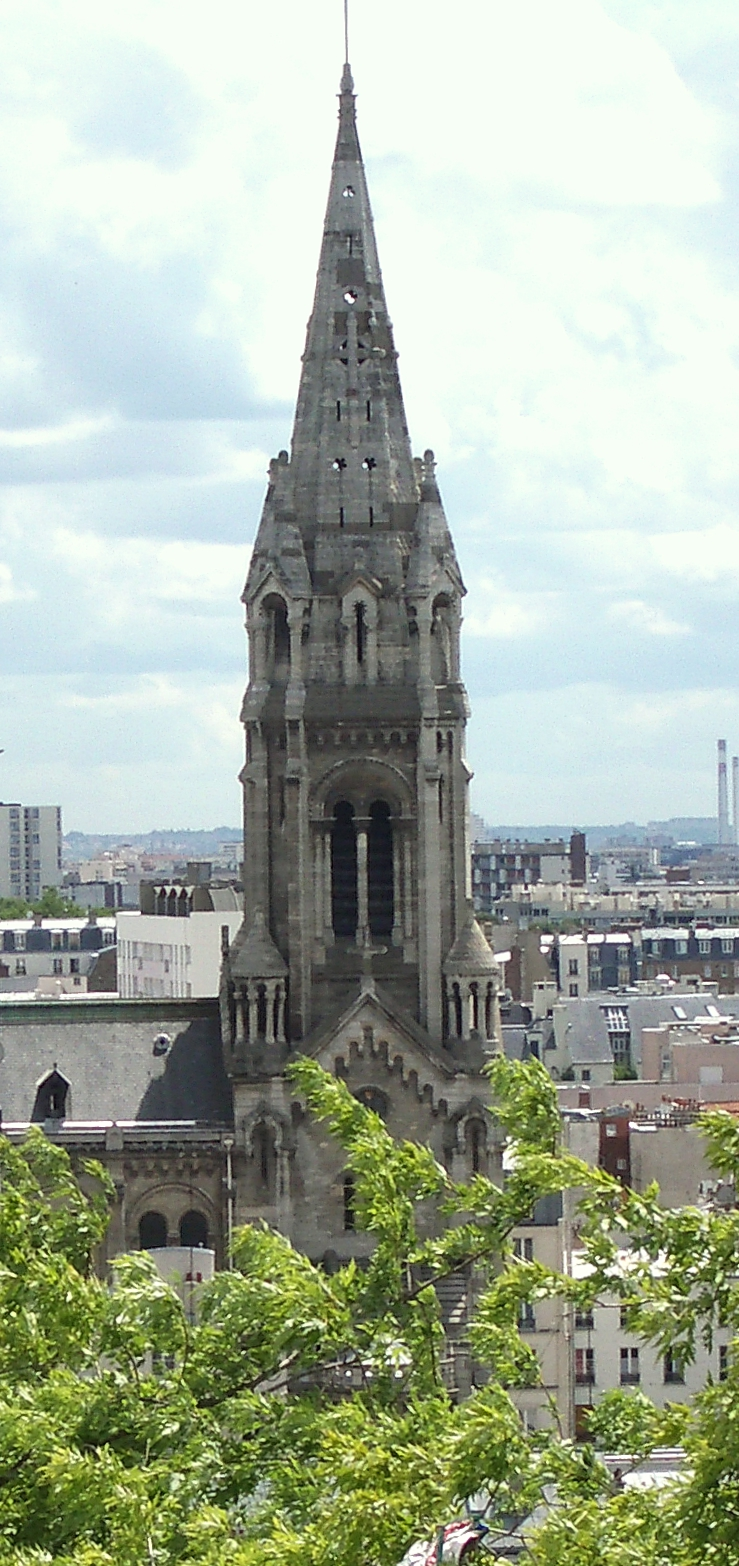
A view of Ménilmontant, Paris from the hill of Belleville

== History ==
Historically, Belleville was a working-class neighborhood. People living in the independent village of Belleville played a large part in establishing the Second French Republic through their actions during the Revolution of 1848. In 1871, residents of the incorporated neighborhood of Belleville were some of the strongest supporters of the Paris Commune. When the Versailles Army came to reconquer Paris in May of that year, it faced some of the toughest resistance in Belleville and in neighboring Ménilmontant. The bloody street fighting persisted in the two eastern districts, and the last of the barricades is said to have been in the Rue Ramponeau in Belleville.

During the first half of the 20th century, many immigrants settled there: German Jews fleeing the Third Reich in 1933, and Spaniards in 1939. Many Algerians and Tunisian Jews arrived in the early 1960s.

Belleville is home to one of the largest congregations of the Reformed Church of France. The Église Réformée de Belleville has been in the area since shortly before World War I.

== Culture ==
Belleville, 2021

Today, Belleville is a colourful, multi-ethnic neighbourhood and also home to one of the city's two Chinatowns, the other located in the 13th arrondissement near the Place d'Italie. Since the 1980s, an important Chinese community has been established there. There are many restaurants and associations and stores offering Chinese products. A fairly large and popular outdoor market is held there every Tuesday and Friday along the Boulevard de Belleville, where many local Île-de-France farmers sell their produce.

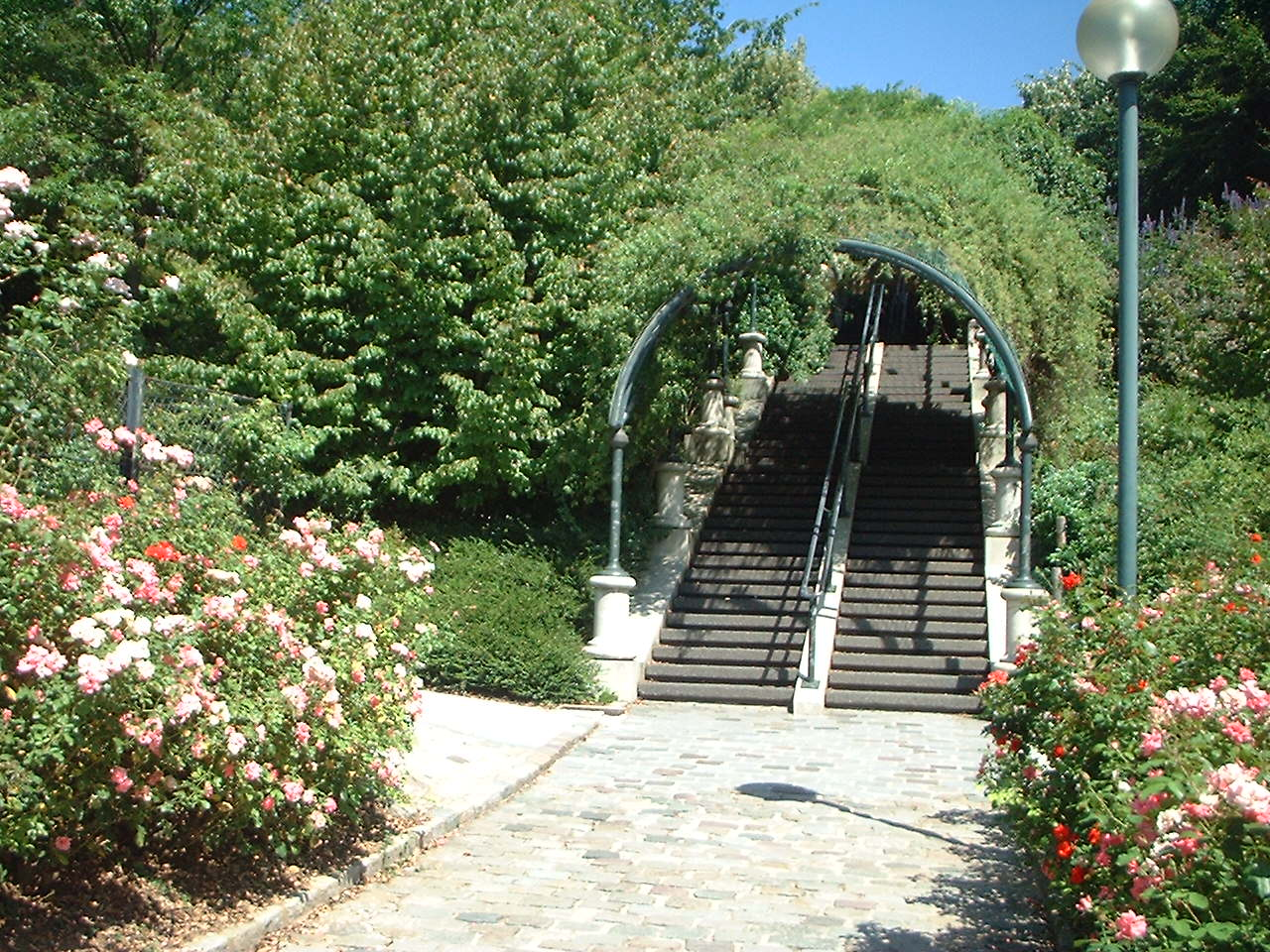
The Parc de Belleville

During the 1980s Parisian artists and musicians, attracted by the cheaper rents, the numerous vacant large spaces, and the old Paris charm of its smaller streets (Belleville was ignored, perhaps spared, during much of the architectural modernisation efforts and reparations of the 1960s and 1970s, the greatest exception being the area around the Place des Fêtes), started moving there. Many artists now live and work in Belleville and studios are scattered throughout the quartier. Some abandoned factories have been transformed into art squats, where several alternative artists and musicians, such as the band Les Rita Mitsouko began their careers.

Belleville is one of the most important neighbourhoods in Paris when it comes to Street Art. For example, Rue Denoyez or Place Frehel are a changing display of wall covering street art.

The demographics of the neighbourhood have undergone many changes throughout the decades. While Armenians, Greeks, and Ashkenazi Jews were once the predominant ethnic groups, North Africans, and more recently, sub-Saharan Africans have been displacing these others.

Within the neighbourhood there is a cemetery and park, the Parc de Belleville, which ascends the western slope of the hill and offers, in addition to a panoramic view of the Paris skyline, a strikingly modern contrast to the classical gardens of the city centre and the eccentric nineteenth century romanticism of the nearby Parc des Buttes Chaumont. A School of Architecture is also located in Belleville.

The iconic French singer Édith Piaf grew up there and, according to legend, was born under a lamppost on the steps of the Rue de Belleville. A commemorative plaque can be found at number 72. A true Bellevilloise, Piaf sang and spoke the French language in a way that epitomised the accent de Belleville, which has been compared to the Cockney accent of London, England. The Belleville dialect is nowadays rarely heard, and most Bellevillians nowadays speak modern Parisian, which is synonymic with the spoken Standard French language heard in the French medias. Belleville is prominently featured in the 2007 biographical film of her life, La Vie En Rose.

Other famous Bellevillois include film director Maurice Tourneur, legendary French can-can dancer Jane Avril and popular singer and actor Eddy Mitchell. The filmmaker Maïwenn grew up in Belleville and lives there now.

== In popular culture ==
Belleville is the subject of several French songs, including Eddy Mitchell's "Belleville ou Nashville?" and Serge Reggiani's "Le Barbier de Belleville". Belleville was also the location of the book La Vie Devant Soi by Romain Gary.

Belleville was named one of the unique neighborhoods in the world in 2016.

Belleville is also commemorated as the title of one of the most famous of the works of Django Reinhardt.

In Puccini's opera "Il Tabarro" (first part of the triple bill "Il Trittico") the lovers sing of their shared longing for the place where they both grew up, "Belleville è il nostro suolo e il nostro mondo! Noi non possiamo vivere sull'acqua!" (Belleville is our own soil and all our world! We cannot live forever on the water!) in comparison to the dreary nomadic life of working on a river barge.

A popular animated film, The Triplets of Belleville, was released in 2003. It received an Academy Award nomination.

Daniel Pennac's Malaussène saga takes place in Belleville.

== Transportation ==
Belleville is served by the Metro stations Belleville, Pyrénées and Jourdain.

== Films shot in Belleville ==
- Monsieur Ibrahim (Monsieur Ibrahim et les fleurs du Coran), 2003, directed by François Dupeyron
- The Bourne Identity, 2002, 'Hotel de la Paix' scene, directed by Doug Liman
- Madame Rosa (La Vie Devant Soi), 1975, directed by Moshé Mizrahi
- The Red Balloon (Le Ballon Rouge), 1956, directed by Albert Lamorisse
- Rue des Cascades (a.k.a. Un Gosse de la Butte), 1964, directed by Maurice Delbez
- Golden Helmet (Casque d'or), 1951, directed by Jacques Becker
- Polisse, 2011, directed by Maïwenn
