= Ménilmontant =

Neighbourhood in Paris, France

Coordinates: 48.8661°N 2.3837°E

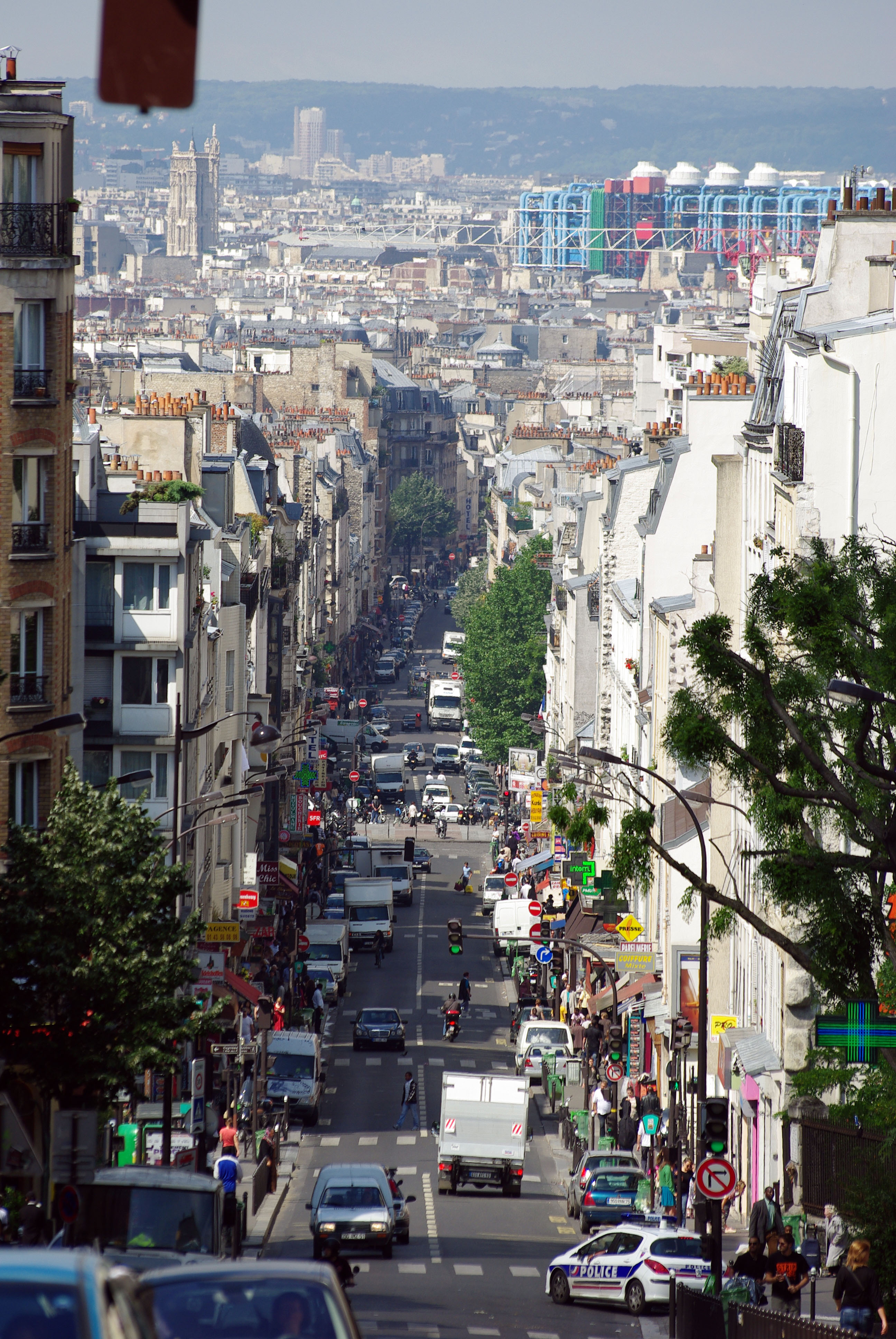
Rue de Ménilmontant, the main street of Ménilmontant, with central Paris and the Centre Georges Pompidou in the distance.

Ménilmontant (French pronunciation: [menilmɔ̃tɑ̃]) is a neighbourhood of Paris, situated in the city's 20th arrondissement. It is roughly defined as the area north of the Père Lachaise Cemetery, south of Parc de Belleville, and between Avenue Jean-Aicard on the west and Rue Pelleport on the east. The neighborhood includes an 87 m (285.4 ft) high hill, making it the third-highest neighborhood in Paris (after Montmartre and neighboring Belleville).

Throughout much of the Middle Ages, what is now known as Ménilmontant was a rural hilltop hamlet within the independent commune (municipality) of Belleville, where wealthy Parisians vacationed. By the 19th century, as a result of the Industrial Revolution and urbanization, Ménilmontant quickly grew to include a large immigrant and working-class population, and in 1860, it was, like other suburbs surrounding the French capital, annexed into the city of Paris. By the mid-late 20th century, many artists, musicians, students, and hippies began to move into the area, giving the neighborhood a distinctively bohemian, left-wing and counterculture identity.

Today, old factory buildings have been repurposed to house hip live music venues such as La Bellevilloise and La Maroquinerie, while grungy bars along hilly Rue de Ménilmontant lead to warrens of narrow, cobblestone streets and artists’ studios.

The neighborhood is served by metro, with line 2 stations at Ménilmontant, Couronnes, and Père Lachaise, and line 3 stations at Père Lachaise, and Gambetta.

== Etymology ==
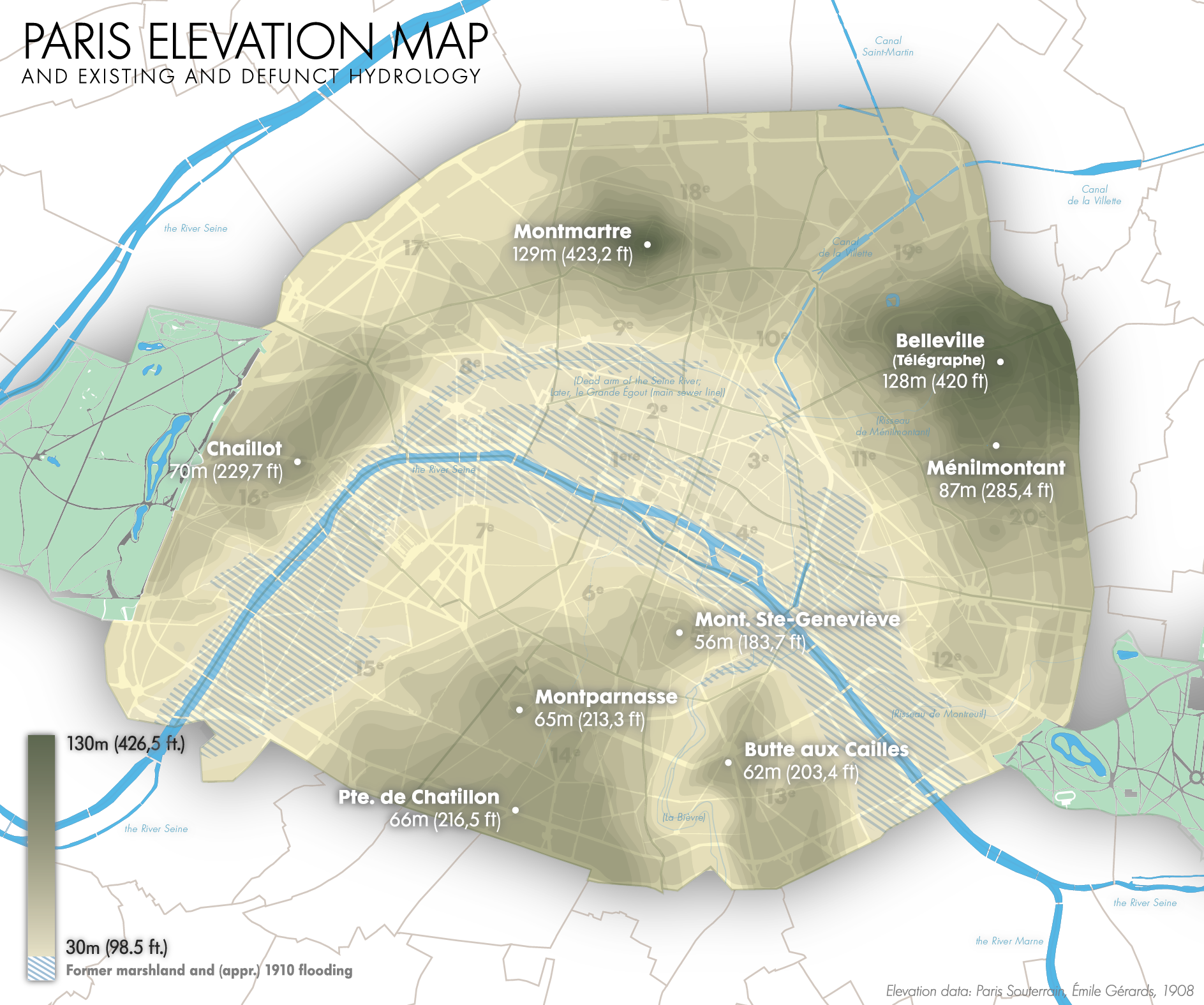
Ménilmontant among other Parisian hills and hydrology

The name Ménilmontant is said to derive from Mesnil Mautemps, meaning "bad weather house" in medieval French. By the 16th century mautemps had been corrupted into montant (meaning "climbing"), most likely owing to its situation on a hill overlooking Paris. Thus, Ménilmontant can perhaps be best interpreted as meaning "climbing house".

== History ==
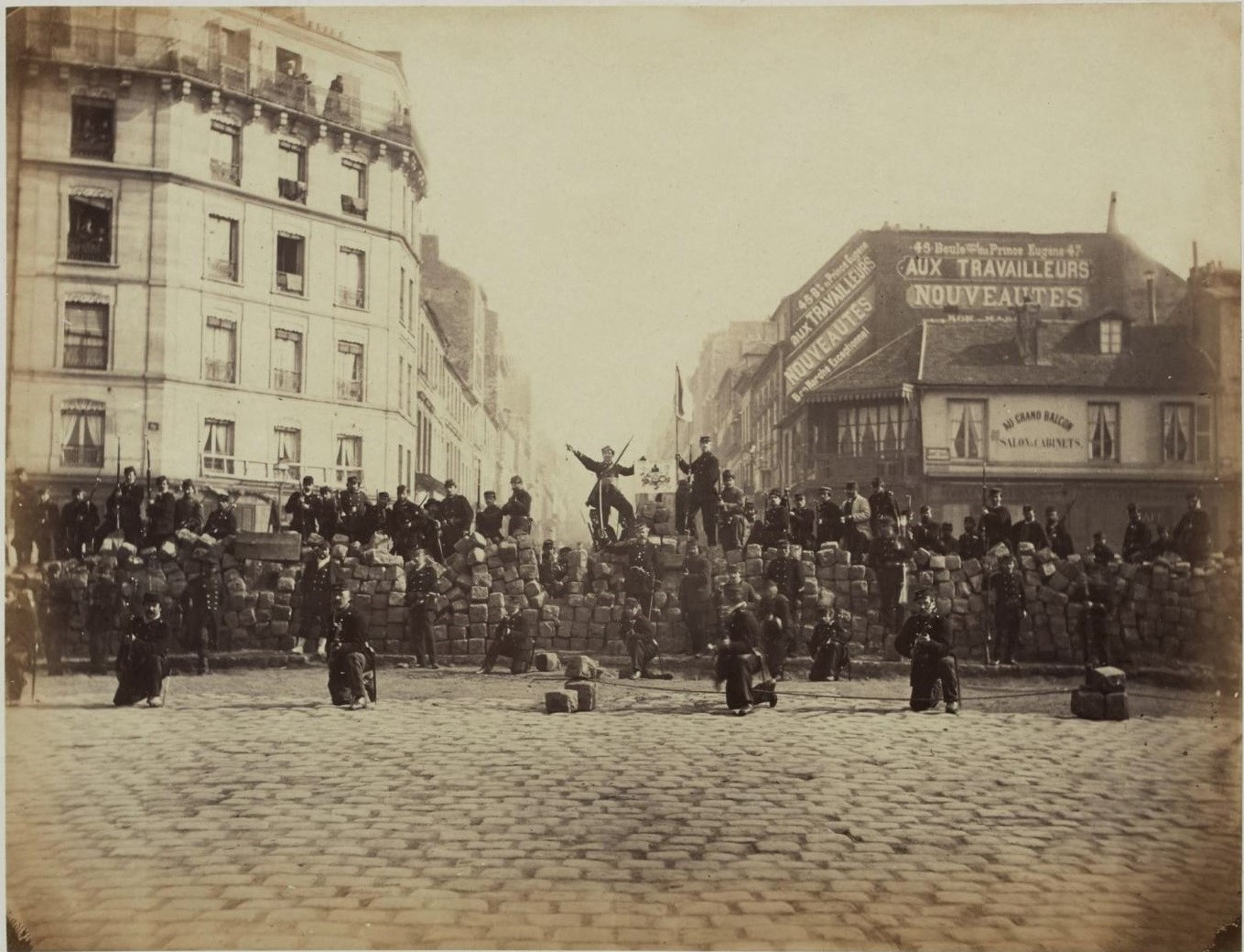
A barricade thrown up by Communard National Guards in Ménilmontant on 18 March 1871.

Before its 1860 absorption into Paris, Ménilmontant lay beyond the capital's tax border (octroi). As a result, wine was substantially cheaper in Ménilmontant, leading to Parisians flocking to the area at night, and the development of numerous drinking establishments, known as guinguettes, in the 18th century.

In 1832, Ménilmontant, already urbanized and heavily working-class, served as the location of a Saint-Simonian retreat, established by socialist political theorist Barthélemy-Prosper Enfantin and his followers, before being banned by the authorities for "sponsoring an illicit secret society and encouraging practices contrary to public morality."

Ménilmontant also played a pivotal role in the Paris Commune, as the area was a hotbed for working-class radicalism. When the Versailles Army came to reconquer Paris in May of 1871, it faced some of the toughest resistance in Ménilmontant. Bloody street fighting persisted in Ménilmontant, ultimately coming to an end during the semaine sanglante ("bloody week") in Père Lachaise.

Today, references to the Paris Commune remain part of the very fabric of the Ménilmontant, from street art and right down to the local football club, Ménilmontant FC 1871 - whose name and crest are heavily loaded with socialist and communard symbolism.

== In popular culture ==
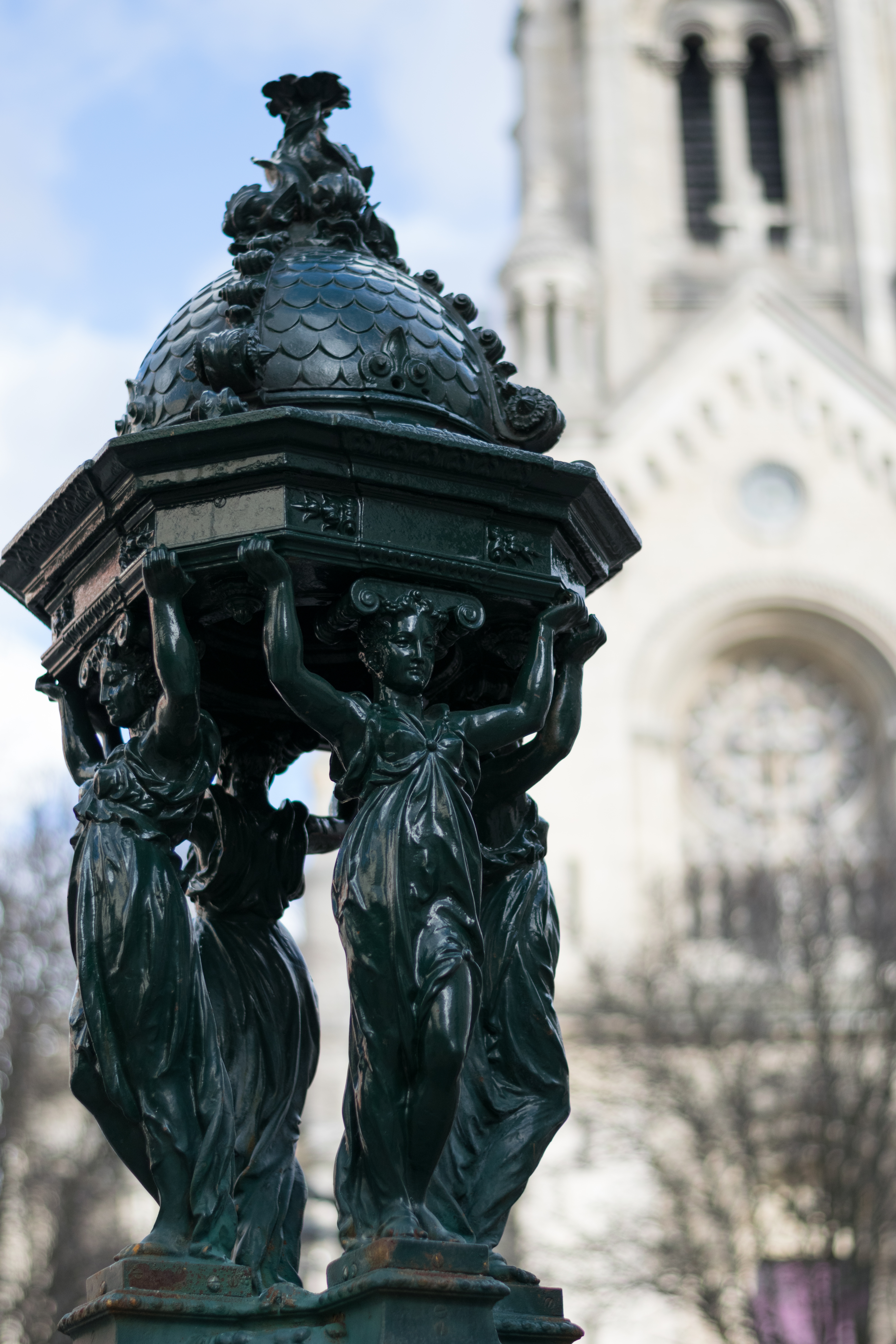
A Wallace fountain with the église Notre-Dame-de-la-Croix de Ménilmontant on the square Maurice-Chevalier in Paris, France.

=== Literature ===
- Menilmontant is the scene of the first part of Russian-born Andreï Makine's novel The Life of an Unknown Man.
- The Prix Goncourt winning novel La Maternelle (1904) takes place in Ménilmontant.
- The Ménilmontant neighborhood is mentioned prominently in Henry Miller's 1956 novel Quiet Days in Clichy as well as in the 1969 film adaptation of that novel by Jens Jørgen Thorsen.

=== Singing ===
- Film star and singer Maurice Chevalier was born in Ménilmontant.
- Ménilmontant is a song by the French singer Charles Trenet. An instrumental version was recorded by Django Reinhardt in 1949/50.
- "Rue de Ménilmontant" is a song by the French singer Camille Dalmais.

=== Cinema ===
- Ménilmontant (1926), written and directed by Dimitri Kirsanoff, takes its name from Ménilmontant.
- Les Enfants du Paradis (1945), the character Garance hails from Ménilmontant.
- Casque d'or (1952), starring Simone Signoret, is set in Ménilmontant.
- Le Ballon Rouge (1956), the Palme d'Or–winning classic fantasy short film, was set in Ménilmontant.
- Gigot (1962), an American comedy film directed by Gene Kelly and starring Jackie Gleason, was filmed in Ménilmontant.
- The Bourne Identity (2002), the chase scene, with Franka Potente and Matt Damon in a Mini Hatch, was filmed partly in Ménilmontant.
- Un p'tit gars de Ménilmontant (2013), a crime drama movie by Alain Minier, was set in Ménilmontant.
