= Pyrénées station =

Metro station in Paris, France

Pyrénées
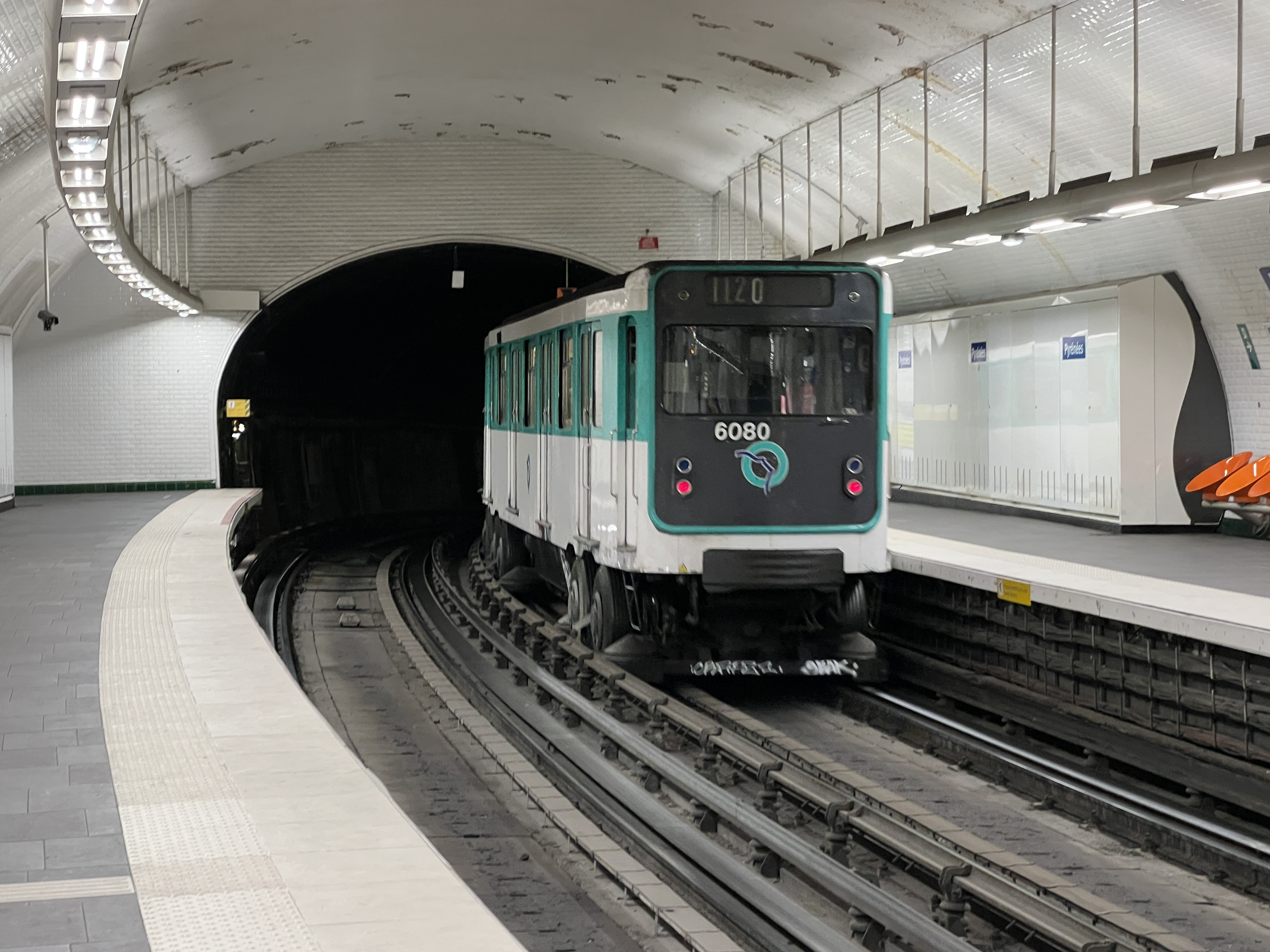
- Platforms

General information
- Location: 19th arrondissement of Paris; Île-de-France; France
- Coordinates: 48°52′26″N 2°23′07″E
- System: Paris Métro station
- Owner: RATP
- Operator: RATP
- Line: Paris Metro Paris Metro Line 11
- Platforms: 2 (2 side platforms)
- Tracks: 2

Other information
- Station code: 24-14
- Fare zone: 1

History
- Opened: 28 April 1935

Passengers
- 1,364,625 (2020)

Services
Preceding station	Paris Metro	Following station
Belleville towards Châtelet	Line 11	Jourdain towards Rosny–Bois-Perrier
Location
- Location within Paris

Pyrénées (French pronunciation: [piʁene]) is a station on line 11 of the Paris Métro in the 19th and 20th arrondissements. It is named after the nearby rue des Pyrénées, which is named after the Pyrenees mountains.

== History ==
The station opened as part of the original section of the line from Châtelet to Porte des Lilas on 28 April 1935.

As part of the "Un métro + beau" programme by the RATP, the station was renovated and modernised on 5 August 2008.

On 1 April 2016, half of the nameplates on the station's platforms were temporarily replaced by the RATP as part of April Fool's Day, along with 12 other stations. It was humorously renamed "Alpes", to promote the other main mountain range in France, the Alps.

As part of modernization works for the extension of the line to Rosny–Bois-Perrier in 2023 for the Grand Paris Express, two new additional entrances will be added along both sides of avenue Simon Bolivar with a new ticketing hall and new stairs built to link it and the middle of both platforms. An escalator will also be added to one of the existing entrance (entrance 2) and another between the platform in the direction of Porte des Lilas and the existing ticketing hall by summer 2022.

In 2019, the station was used by 2,920,049 passengers, making it the 182nd busiest of the Métro network out of 302 stations.

In 2020, the station was used by 1,364,625 passengers amidst the COVID-19 pandemic, making it the 191st busiest of the Métro network out of 305 stations.

== Passenger services ==
=== Access ===
The station has 4 entrances with 2 additional ones under construction:

- Entrance 1: rue des Pyrénées
- Entrance 2: rue de Belleville
- Entrance 3: avenue Simon Bolivar
- Entrance 4: rue Clavel
- Entrance 5: rue de l’Equerre (under construction)
- Entrance 6: Square Simon Bolivar (under construction)

=== Station layout ===
Street Level
B1	Mezzanine
Line 11 platforms	Side platform, doors will open on the right
Line 11 platforms	Southbound	← toward Châtelet (Belleville)
Line 11 platforms	Northbound	toward Rosny–Bois-Perrier (Jourdain) →
Line 11 platforms	Side platform, doors will open on the right

=== Platforms ===
The station has a standard configuration with 2 tracks surrounded by 2 side platforms located on a curve.

=== Other connections ===
The station is also served by lines 20, 26, and 71 of the RATP bus network, and at night, by lines N12 and N23 of the Noctilien bus network.

== Nearby ==
- Parc de Belleville
- Parc des Buttes-Chaumont

== Gallery ==
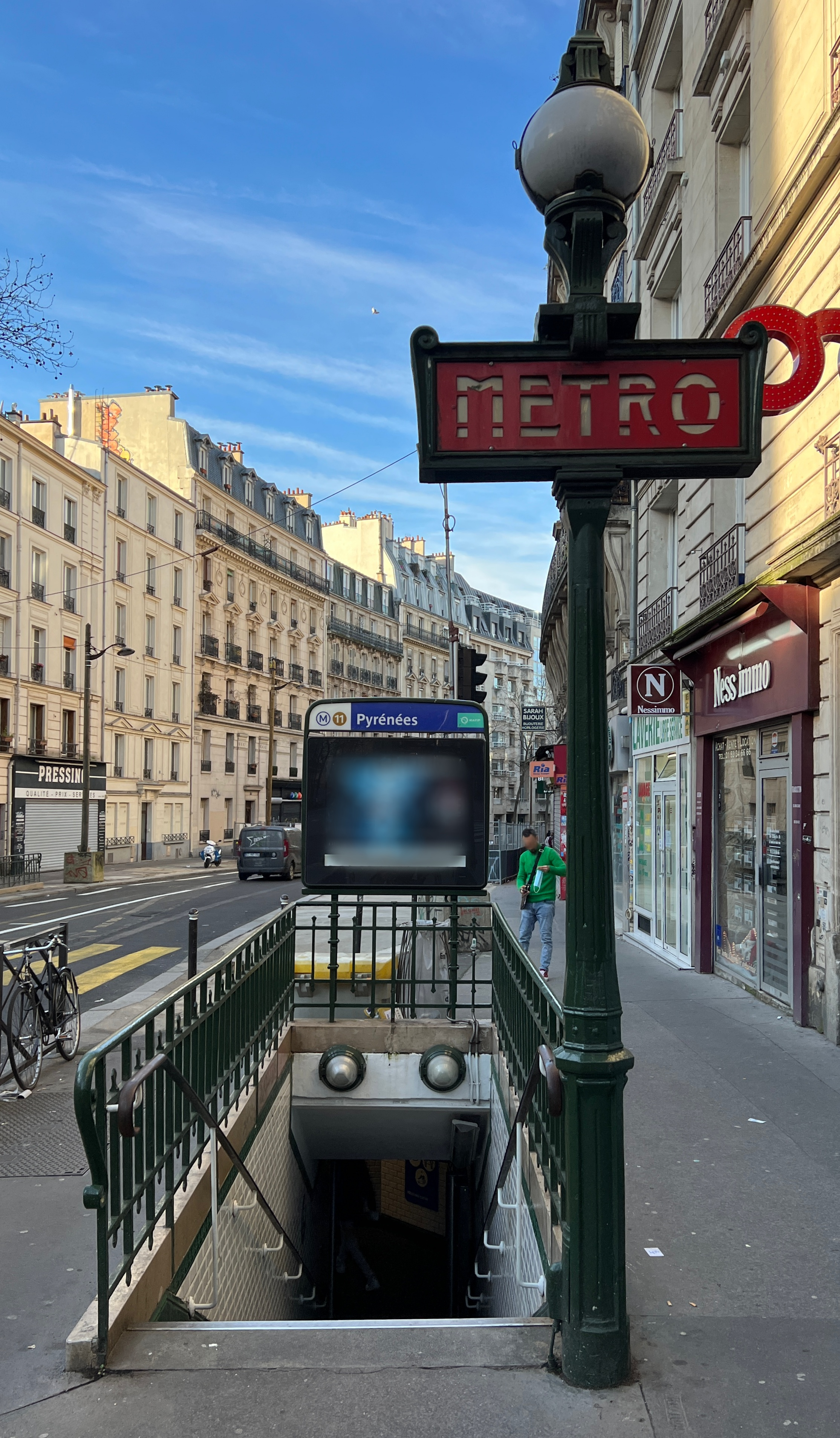
Entrance along avenue Simon Bolivar

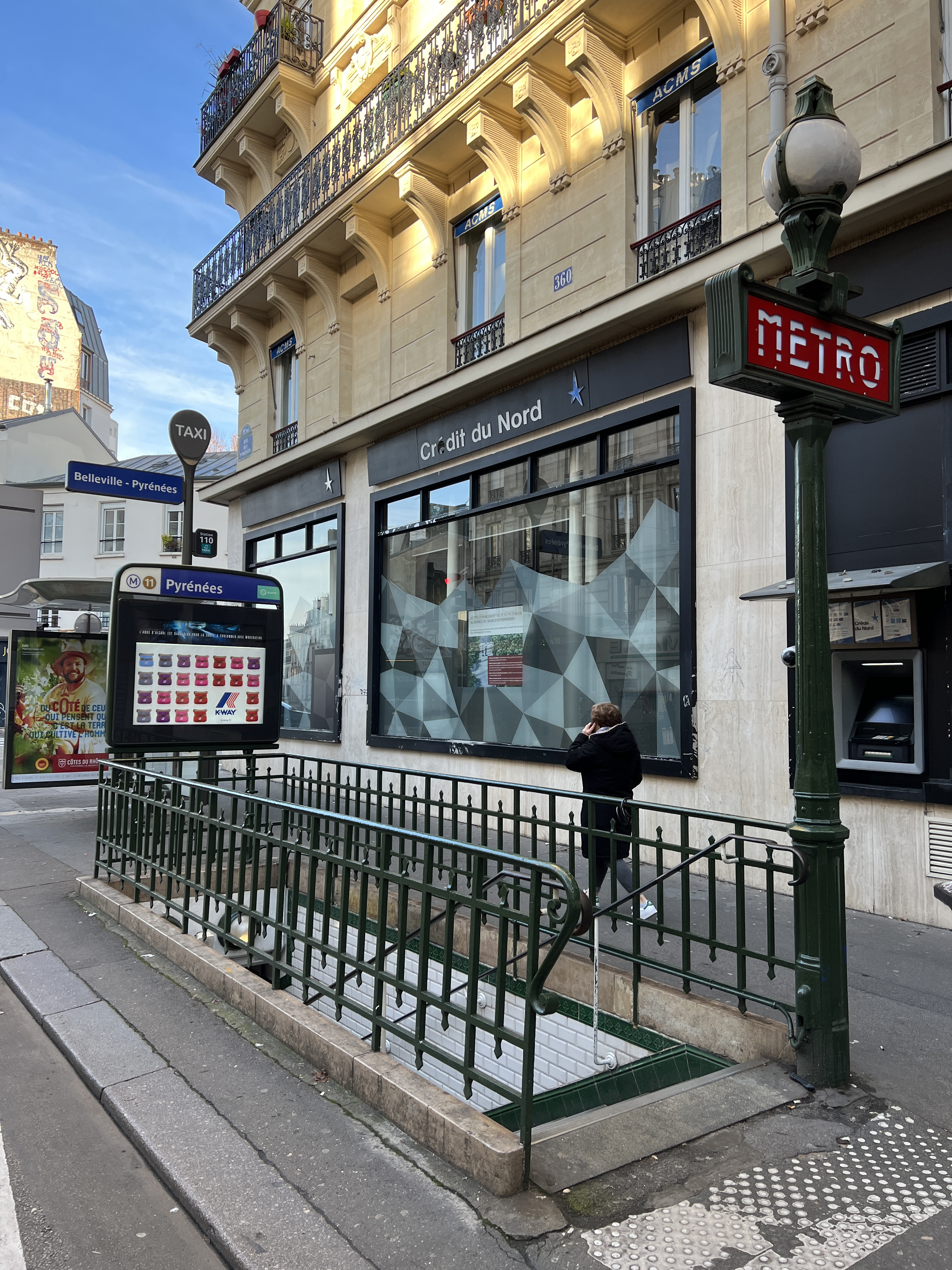
Entrance along rue Pyrénées

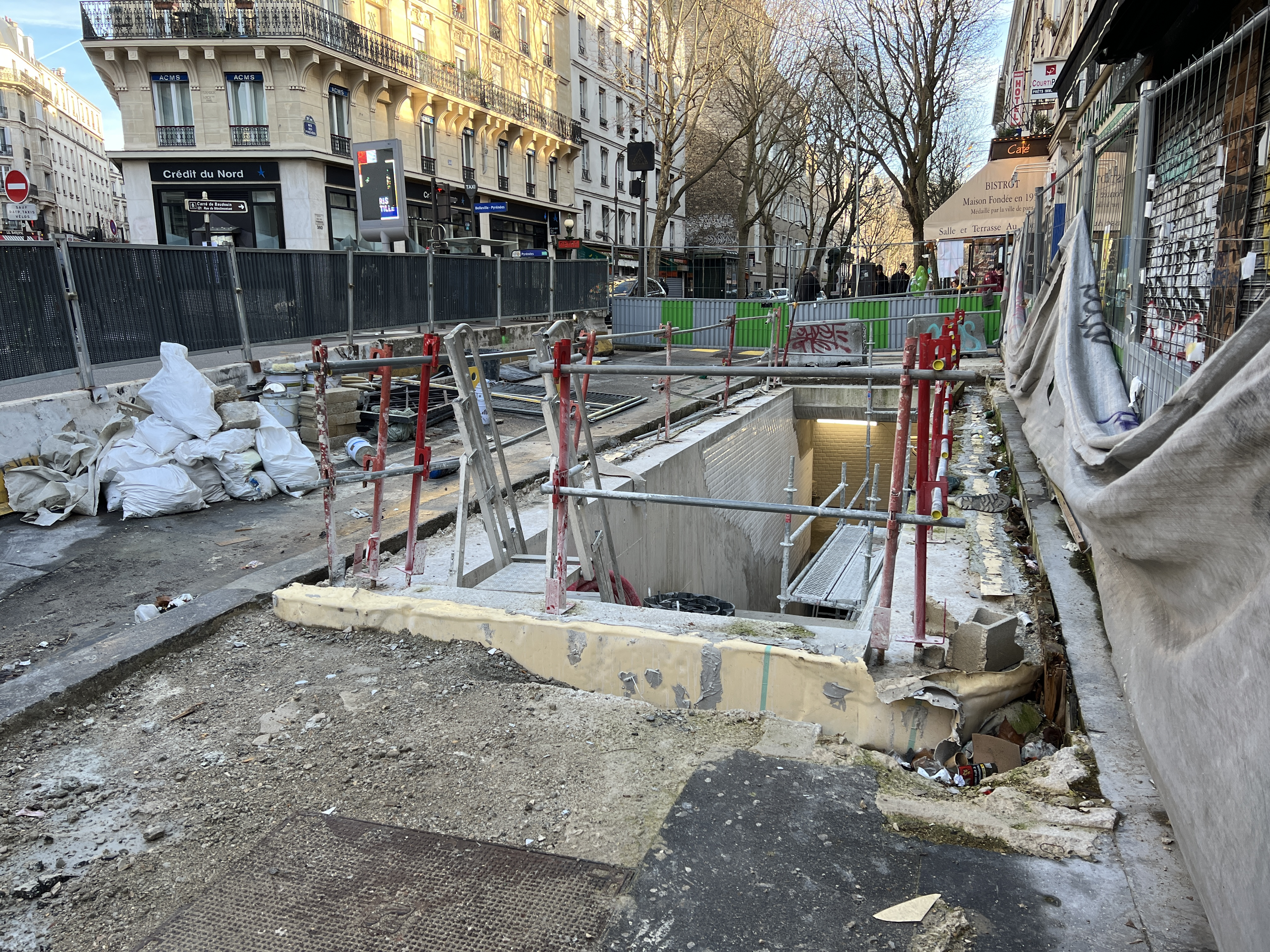
Construction of the new entrances (2022)
