= Belleville (commune) =

Former commune in the Seine département, east of Paris, France

Coordinates: 48.871°N 2.385°E

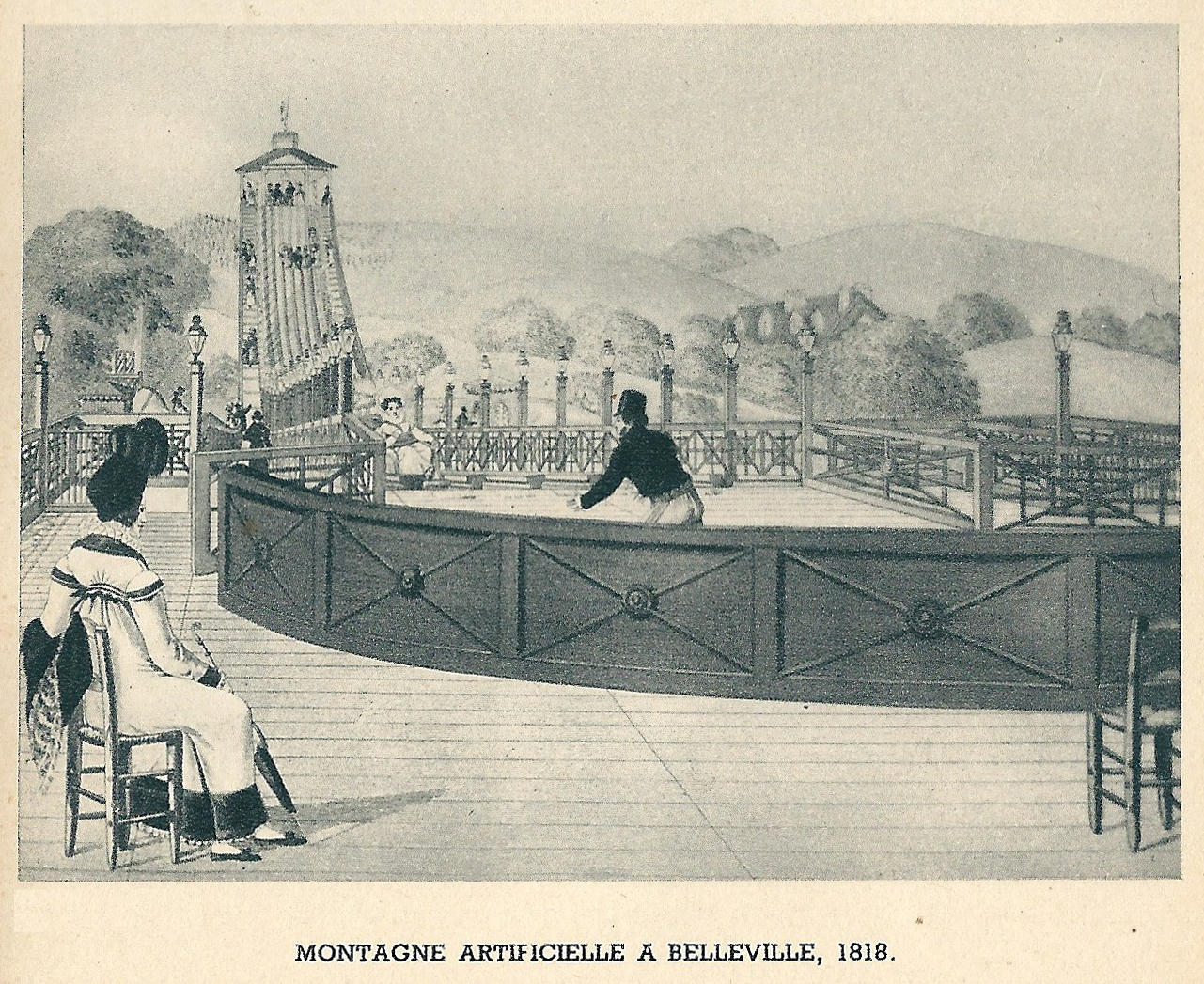
Paris-Belleville

Belleville (French pronunciation: [bɛlvil]) was a French commune in the Seine department, lying immediately east of Paris, Île-de-France. It was one of four communes entirely annexed by the city of Paris in 1860. Its territory is now shared by the 19th and 20th arrondissements, but a neighborhood has retained its name: the quartier de Belleville. The village was built on and around a hill, the second highest of the French capital after Montmartre. The composer and conductor Jules Pillevesse (1837–1903) was born in Belleville.

== History ==
The area was inhabited for many years by people who worked the local quarries, vintners and other merchants.

A commune was created in 1789. Its name is derived from belle vue (literally "beautiful view") and its territory extended to what is today the Parc des Buttes Chaumont and the Père Lachaise Cemetery.

The population increased dramatically in the first half of the 19th century and Baron Haussmann decided to incorporate it into Paris.
