= Jules Pillevestre =

French composer and conductor

- Born: 11 November 1837; Belleville, France
- Died: 27 June 1903 (aged 65); Montrouge, France
- Occupations: Composer; Conductor

Jules François Firmin Pillevestre (real name: Pillevesse) (11 November 1837 – 27 June 1903) was a 19th-century French composer and conductor.

== Biography ==
The son of François Pillevesse and Marguerite Bérard, Jules Pillevesse was born in Belleville and studied at the Conservatoire de Paris where he won awards in music theory (1852) and harmony (1856) in the class of Napoléon Henri Reber as well as cello (1856), counterpoint and fugue (1857) in the class of Michele Carafa. In 1858, he ran for the Prix de Rome with the cantata Jephté, for which he received an honorable mention, behind Samuel David and Edmond Cherouvrier.

Jules Pillevestre made a conducting career in Paris, in particular at the Théâtre du Vaudeville. Under the name Pillevestre he wrote instrumental works and military music. However, there is also a one-act operetta Robinson Crusoé, which was presented in 1866 at the Fantaisies-Parisiennes.

Jules Pillevestre died in Montrouge (Hauts-de-Seine).

== Selected works ==
- Piccolinette, fantaisie-polka for two piccolo flutes and piano
- Duo for two clarinets
- L'Heure du berger (oboe)
- A qui mieux mieux (2 cornets)
- A l'ombre (oboe, clarinet, flute)
- Anches rebelles (clarinet)
- Daphnis et Chloé (oboe and flute)
- Idylle bretonne (2 oboes).
- Premier Offertoire (bass clarinet and organ)

The library of the Garde républicaine in Paris keeps some pieces by Jules Pillevestre. He also made an arrangement for concert band of the operetta Le Baron tzigane (Der Zigeunerbaron) by Johann Strauss II.
