= Parc de Belleville =

Urban park in Paris, France

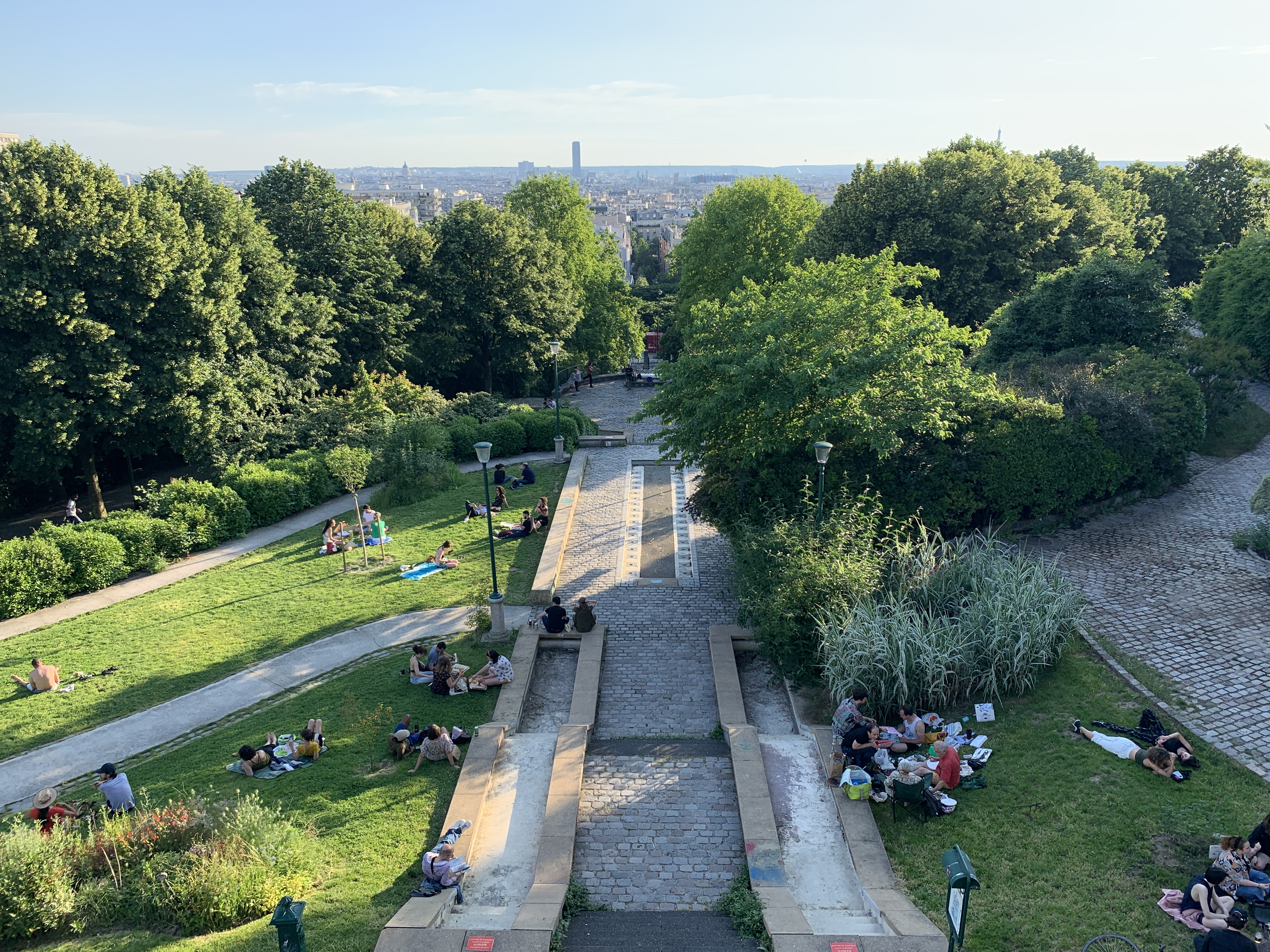
- Parc Belleville
- Interactive map of Parc de Belleville
- Type: Urban park
- Location: 20th arrondissement, Paris
- Coordinates: 48°52′15″N 2°23′05″E
- Area: 11.12 acres (4.50 ha)
- Created: 1988
- Status: Open all year
- Public transit: Located near the Metro stations Pyrénées, Couronnes, Belleville

The Parc de Belleville, one of the parks and gardens of the 20th arrondissement of Paris, is situated between the Parc des Buttes Chaumont and the Père Lachaise Cemetery.

== Description ==
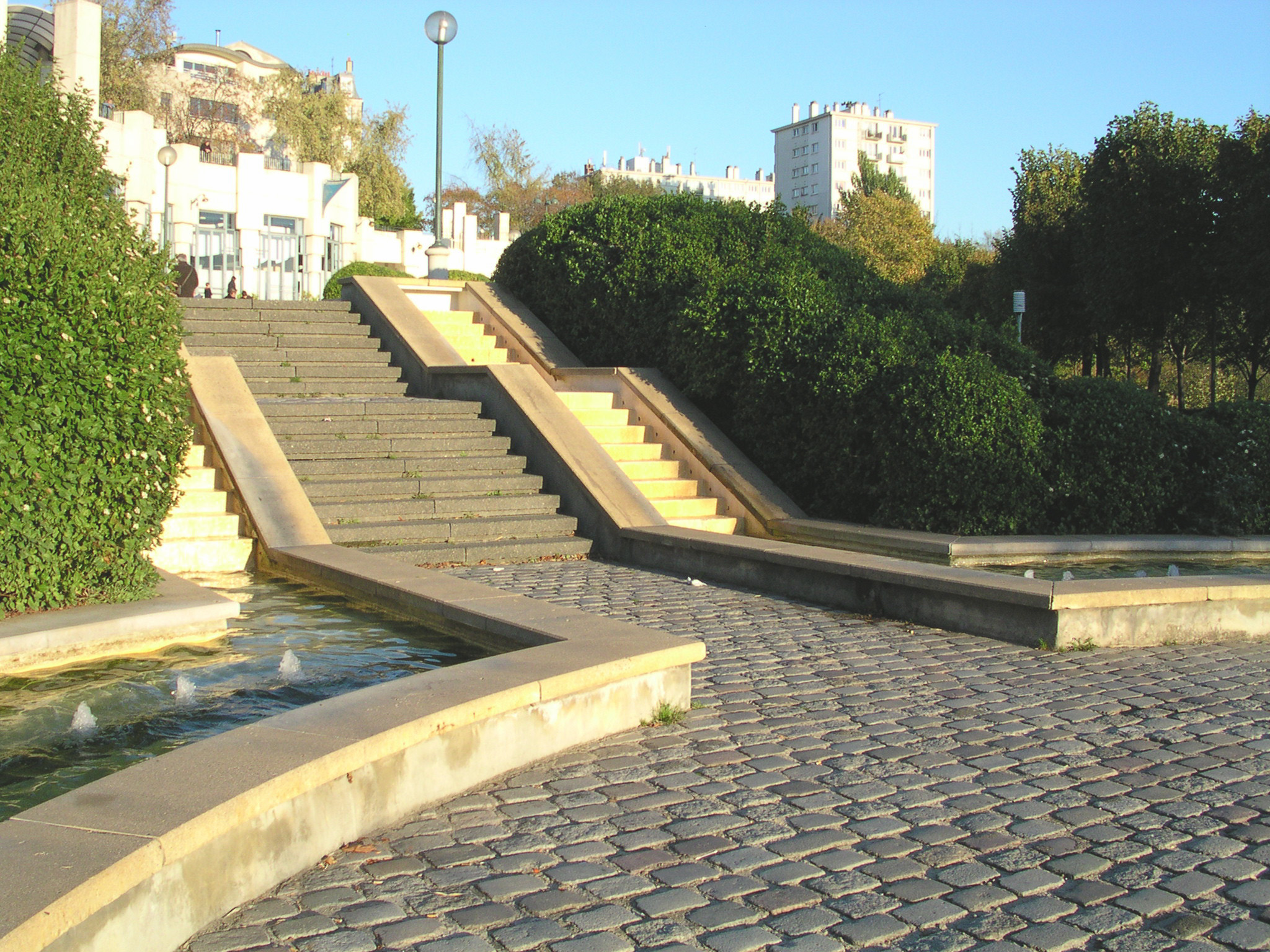
The Parc de Belleville fountain in Paris

The Parc de Belleville is located on the hill of Belleville, its 108 meter elevation making it the highest park in Paris. At the summit of the park, an almost thirty-metre tall terrace provides a panoramic view of the city. The park was conceived by the architect François Debulois and the landscaper Paul Brichet. It was inaugurated in 1988.

The park offers 1200 trees and shrubs, a 100-metre-long waterfall fountain (the longest in Paris), and 1000 m^{2} of lawn accessible to the public. It also contains a wooden playground for children, ping-pong tables, and an open-air theatre. At the top of the park lies the Maison de l'Air, a small museum designed to educate visitors to the importance of fresh air and to the problems of pollution.

The park also prides itself on its display of annual flowers. The gardeners prepare the flower beds two years in advance, in tight collaboration with the horticultural center of Rungis. Their compositions have received prizes numerous times at the Concours des Décorations Florales Estivales (Summer Floral Decoration Competition), which takes place each year in September.

== History ==
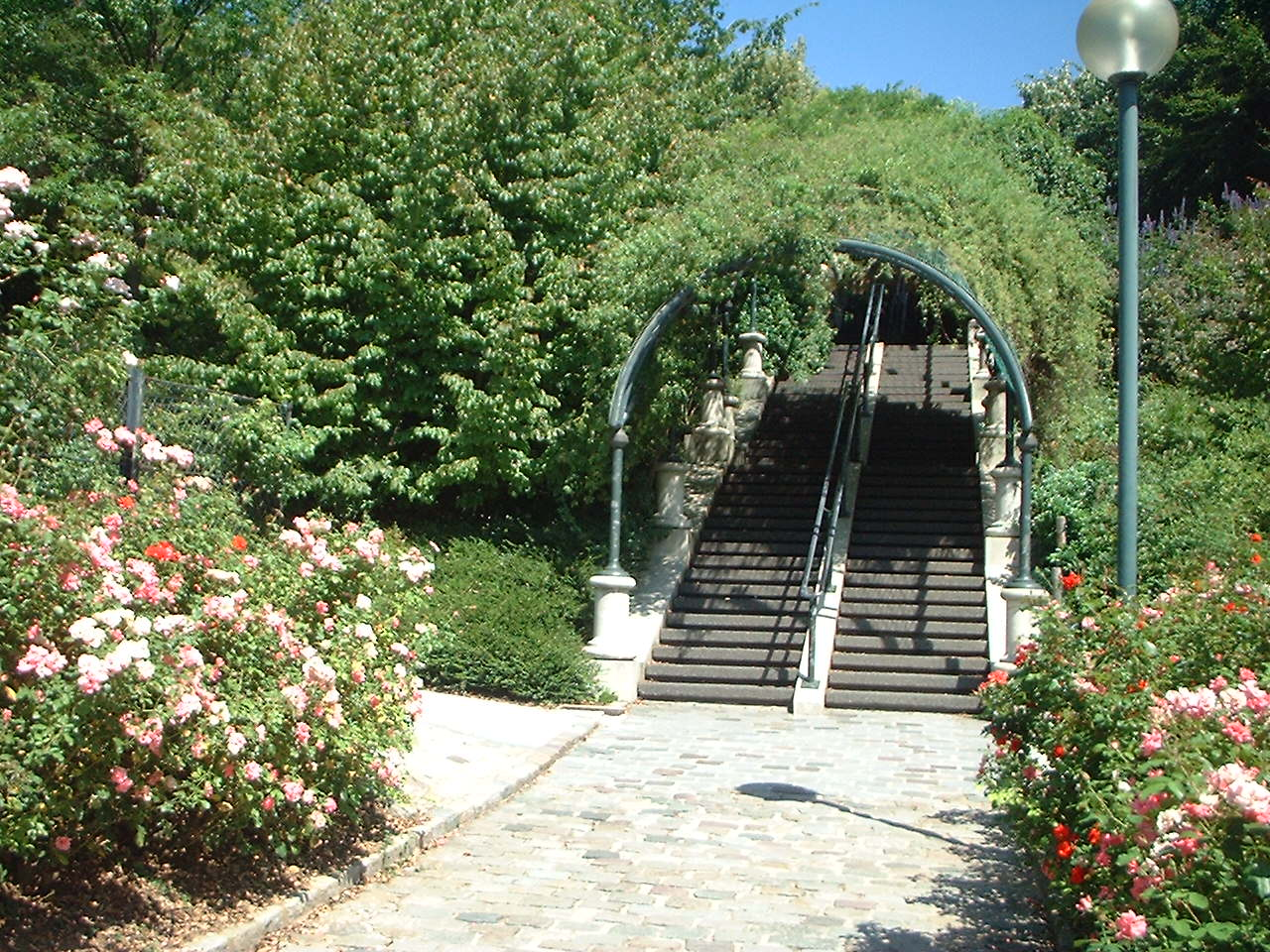
The Parc de Belleville

In the Middle Ages, numerous religious communities acquired plots of land on the hill. They cleared fields, planted grape vines, and tapped numerous springs. Taverns and guinguettes competed for places there from the fourteenth to eighteenth century.

In the mid-eighteenth century, the celebrated publican Ramponneau's tavern "Au Tambour Royal" served a young, slightly effervescent wine made from the Belleville grapes called Piquette. Over time, this use has changed and the name now refers to a drink made from pomace and water, and is figuratively used to refer to a bad wine.

The opening of a gypsum quarry in the nineteenth century attracted a population of seasonal workers (often stonemasons), who worked on Baron Haussmann's construction projects during the winter and returned home in the summer to tend their fields. The area was deemed insalubrious, which didn't improve with the closing of the quarry.

In the 19th century, the cottages which at the time stood on both sides of the steps leading up to the present-day park gave the hill an appearance similar to that of Montmartre. They belonged to Julien Lacroix, one of the most important landowners of the hill of Belleville, and a street which runs alongside the park now bears his name. At this time, a grand party was organized each year on the hill for Mardi Gras. On the last day of the carnival, Mardi Gras, all of Paris came en masse to witness the "descente de la Courtille", one of the three major Mardi Gras processions named after the cheap restaurants that lined the rue de Belleville. Among them, "Le coq Hardi" (The Hardy Rooster) and "La carotte filandreuse" (The Coriaceous Carrot), were well known for the drinking binges of their patrons.

At the end of the 20th century, the cottages disappeared, giving way to more modern buildings and the Parc de Belleville. A vineyard growing Pinot Meunier vines from Champagne and Chardonnay vines from Burgundy still lies at the top of the park as a reminder of the area's viticultural history.
