= Rue de Belleville =

Street in Paris, France

Coordinates: 48°52′31″N 2°23′38″E

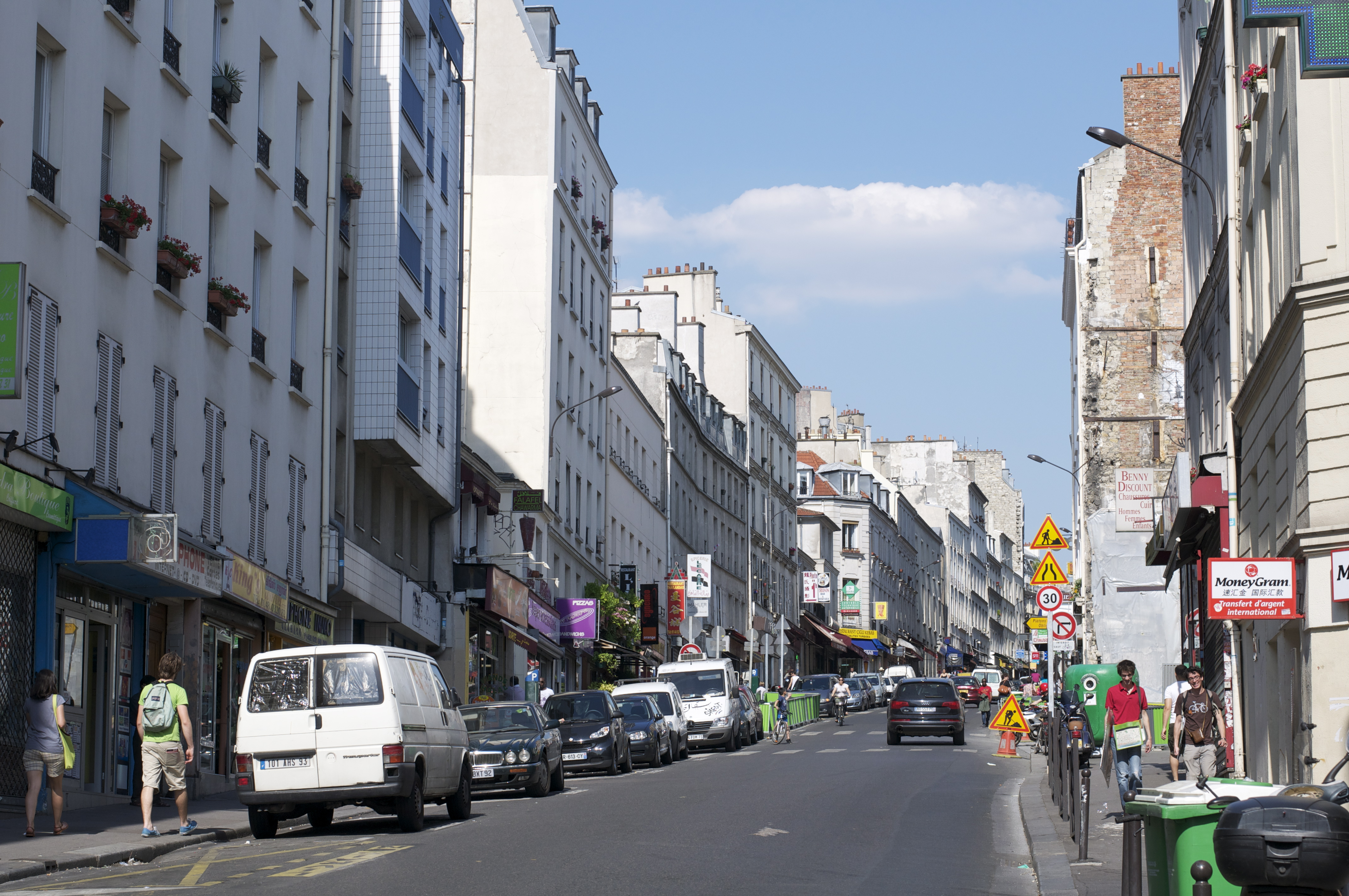

- Location within Paris
- Length: 2,250 m (7,380 ft)
- Width: 11–24 m (36–79 ft)
- Addresses: 3-6
- Arrondissement: 19/20
- Quarter: Belleville; Saint-Fargeau; Amérique

Construction
- Denomination: 2 April 1868

The Rue de Belleville is a street in the 19th and 20th arrondissement of Paris.

== History ==
The Rue de Belleville is an old street, dating as far back as 1670. In the mid-19th century, it had a different name for each of two segments: the Rue de Paris and the Rue du Parc. This contiguous right-of-way was renamed the Rue de Belleville in 1868.

The name Rue de Belleville is related to an old village of the same name, which was later annexed by the City of Paris.

== Bibliography ==
Hillairet, Jacques (1963). Dictionaire historique des rues de Paris (in French) (Seventh ed.). Paris: Les Editions de Minuit.
