= 20th arrondissement of Paris =

- Municipal arrondissement
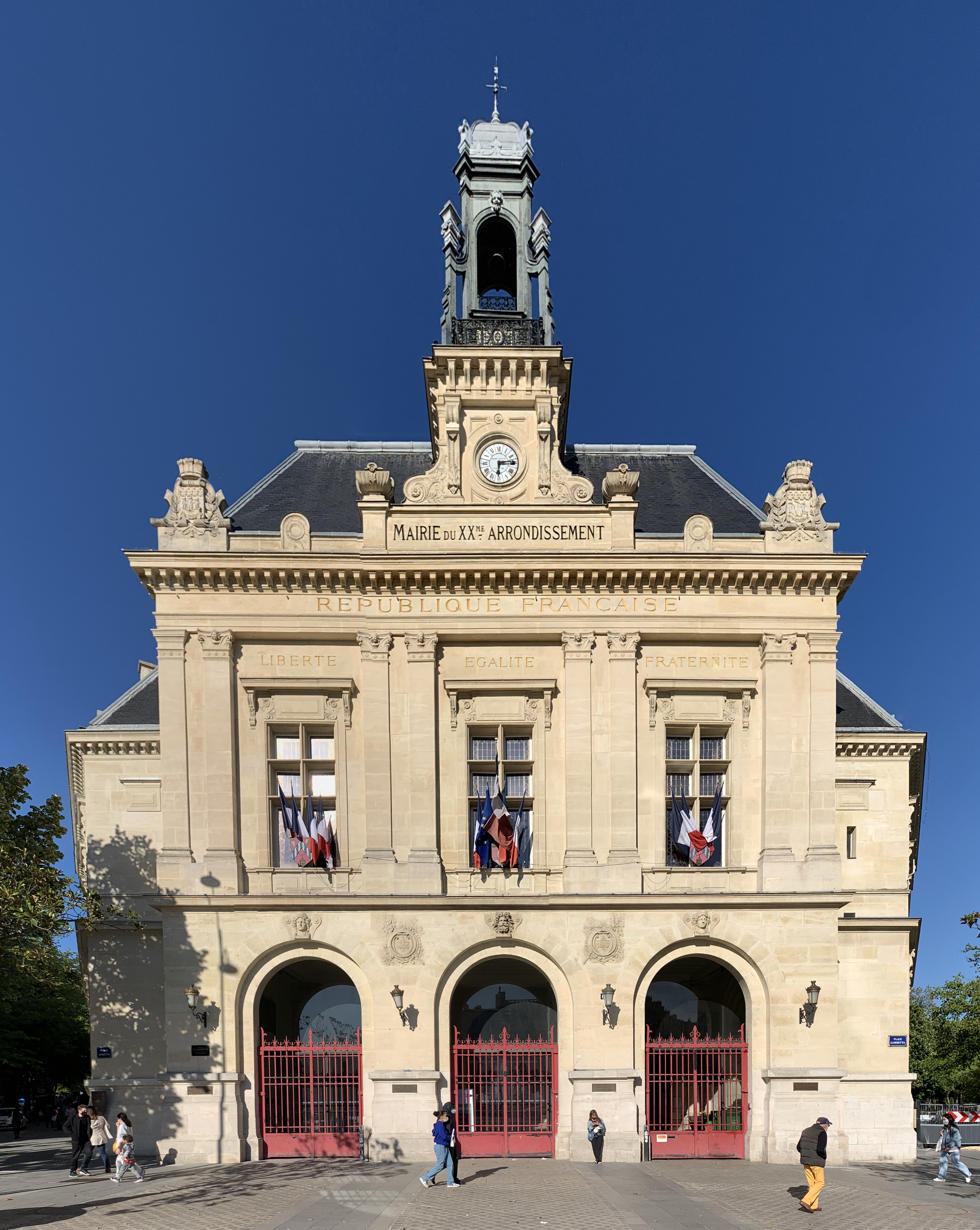
- Mairie du XX^{e} arrondissement

- Coat of arms

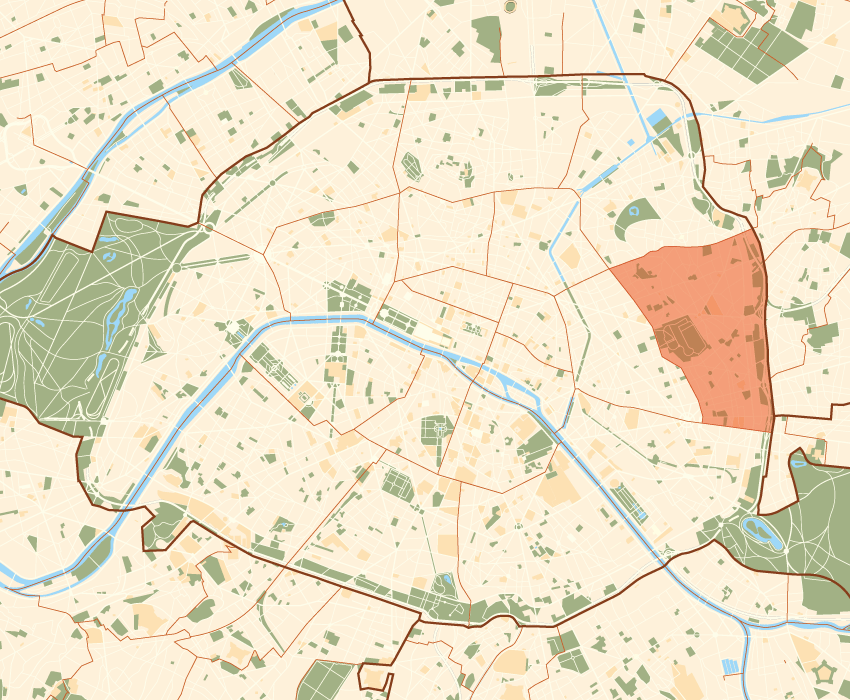
- Location within Paris
- Coordinates: 48°51′54″N 2°23′57″E
- Country: France
- Region: Île-de-France
- Department: Paris
- Commune: Paris

Government
  - Mayor (2020–2026): Éric Pliez (DVG)
- Area: 5.98 km^{2} (2.31 sq mi)
- Population (2023): 185,140
  - Density: 31,000/km^{2} (80,200/sq mi)
- INSEE code: 75120

The 20th arrondissement of Paris (known in French as the XX^{e} arrondissement de Paris or simply as "le vingtième") is the last of the consecutively numbered arrondissements of the capital city of France. Also known as Ménilmontant (pronounced [menilmɔ̃tɑ̃]) after the Ménilmontant neighbourhood it encompasses in its northwest, it is on the right bank of the River Seine and contains some of the city's most cosmopolitan districts. It covers four quarters: Belleville, Saint-Fargeau, Père-Lachaise and Charonne. In 2023, it had a population of 185,140.

The 20th arrondissement is internationally best known for its Père Lachaise Cemetery, the world's most-visited cemetery where one can find the tombs of a number of famous people, such as Édith Piaf, Jim Morrison and Eugène Delacroix.

== Geography ==
The quarters of the 20th arrondissement

The land area of this arrondissement is 5.984 km^{2} (2.310 sq mi; 1,479 acres).

The arrondissement consists of four quarters:

- Quartier Belleville (77)
- Quartier Saint-Fargeau (78)
- Quartier Père-Lachaise (79)
- Quartier Charonne (80)

== Demographics ==
The population of Paris's 20th arrondissement peaked in 1936, when it had 208,115 inhabitants. Today it remains very dense in population and business activity with 54,786 jobs as of the census in 1999.

=== Historical population ===
Historical population

Year	Pop.	±% p.a.
1861	70,060	—
1872	92,772	+2.59%
1881	128,685	+3.70%
1891	142,744	+1.04%
1901	166,115	+1.53%
1911	180,594	+0.84%
1921	187,697	+0.39%
1931	195,731	+0.42%
1936	208,115	+1.23%
1946	193,406	−0.73%
1954	200,208	+0.43%

Year	Pop.	±% p.a.
1962	199,310	−0.06%
1968	188,921	−0.89%
1975	175,795	−1.02%
1982	171,971	−0.31%
1990	184,478	+0.88%
1999	182,952	−0.09%
2007	194,018	+0.74%
2012	197,311	+0.34%
2017	195,814	−0.15%
2023	185,140	−0.93%

Source: Demographia (1861-1999) and INSEE (1876-2023)

=== Immigration ===
Place of birth of residents of the 20th arrondissement in 1999
Born in metropolitan France	Born outside metropolitan France			
74.7%	25.3%			
74.7%	Born in overseas France	Born in foreign countries with French citizenship at birth^{1}	EU-15 immigrants^{2}	Non-EU-15 immigrants
74.7%	1.9%	4.0%	3.1%	16.3%
^{1} This group is made up largely of former French settlers, such as pieds-noirs in Northwest Africa, followed by former colonial citizens who had French citizenship at birth (such as was often the case for the native elite in French colonies), as well as to a lesser extent foreign-born children of French expatriates. A foreign country is understood as a country not part of France in 1999, so a person born for example in 1950 in Algeria, when Algeria was an integral part of France, is nonetheless listed as a person born in a foreign country in French statistics.^{2} An immigrant is a person born in a foreign country not having French citizenship at birth. An immigrant may have acquired French citizenship since moving to France, but is still considered an immigrant in French statistics. On the other hand, persons born in France with foreign citizenship (the children of immigrants) are not listed as immigrants.

== Cityscape ==
=== Places of interest ===
- Parc de Belleville
- Père Lachaise Cemetery
  Containing the tombs of many famous artists: composers (such as Frédéric Chopin and Gioacchino Rossini), writers (including Oscar Wilde, Honoré de Balzac, and Marcel Proust), painters (Camille Pissarro, Jacques-Louis David, Eugène Delacroix, and others), musicians (Jim Morrison of The Doors and Edith Piaf among others), and the playwright Molière.
- Church of Saint-Jean-Bosco, Paris. One of the few Art Deco churches in Paris, built 1933–1938. It retains its original Art Deco decoration.
- Saint-Germain de Charonne, Paris. One of the oldest churches in Paris.
- Notre-Dame-des-Otages, Paris. 1930s church with colourful stained glass
- Monument aux Parisiens morts pendant la Première Guerre mondiale. A memorial commemorating the 94,415 Parisians who died in the line of duty during the First World War.

=== Important districts ===
Quarters of the 20th arrondissement

- Quarter of Belleville
  - Neighbourhood of Ménilmontant
- Quarter of Charonne

== Government and infrastructure ==
The Directorate-General for External Security (DGSE) has its head office in the arrondissement.

== Media ==
The humour publication Charlie Hebdo had its head office in the arrondissement.

== Education ==
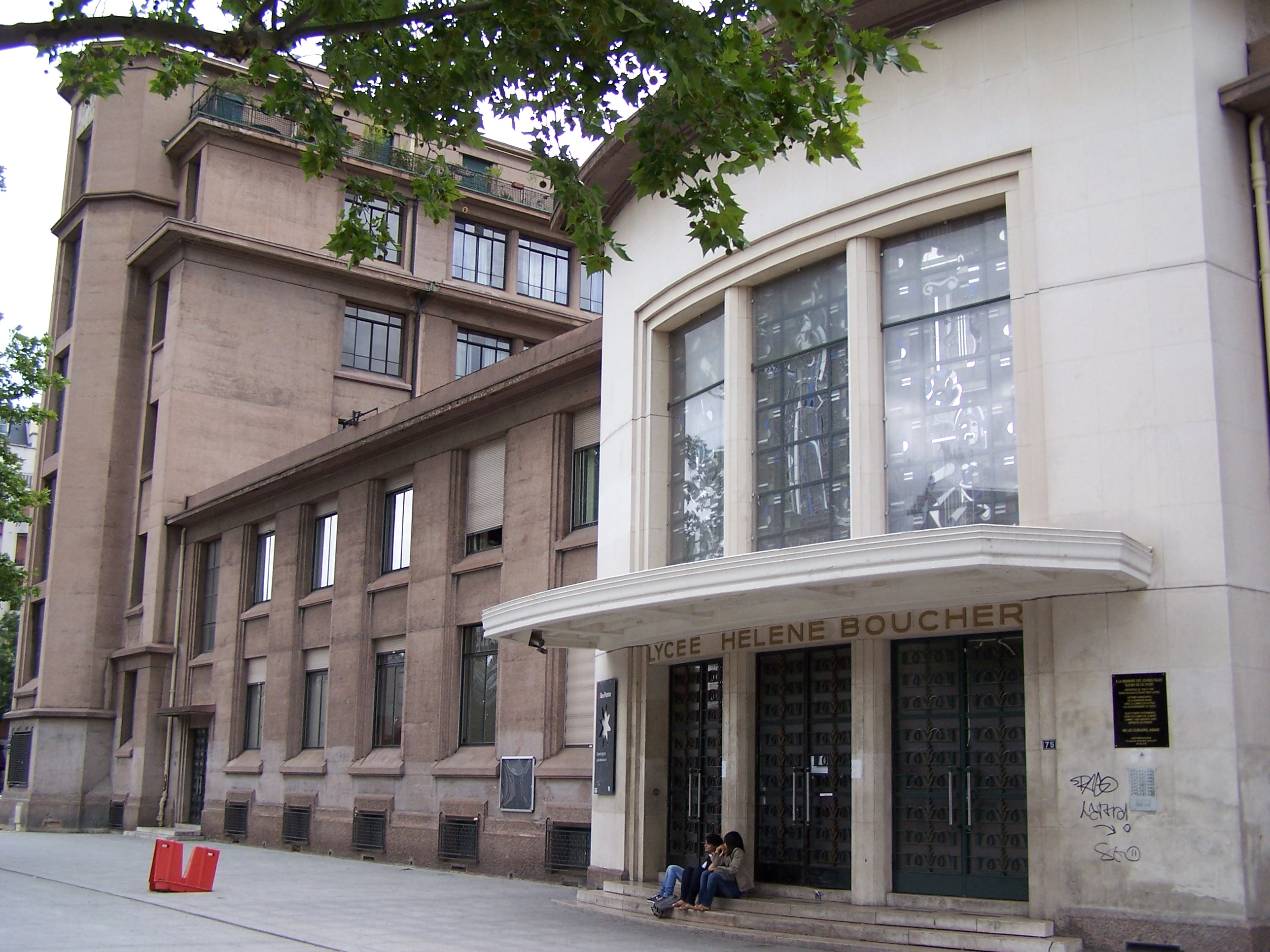
Lycée Hélène Boucher

Senior high schools include:

- Lycée Hélène Boucher
- Lycée Maurice-Ravel
- Lycée Charles-de-Gaulle
- Lycée Beth Yacov
- Lycée Heikhal Menahem Sinaï

Other institutions:

- École Vitruve
- École Eugène Reisz
- Collège Jean Perrin
