= La Dhuys station =

Paris Metro station in Montreuil and Rosny-sous-Bois

Rosny-sous-Bois–Montreuil La Dhuys
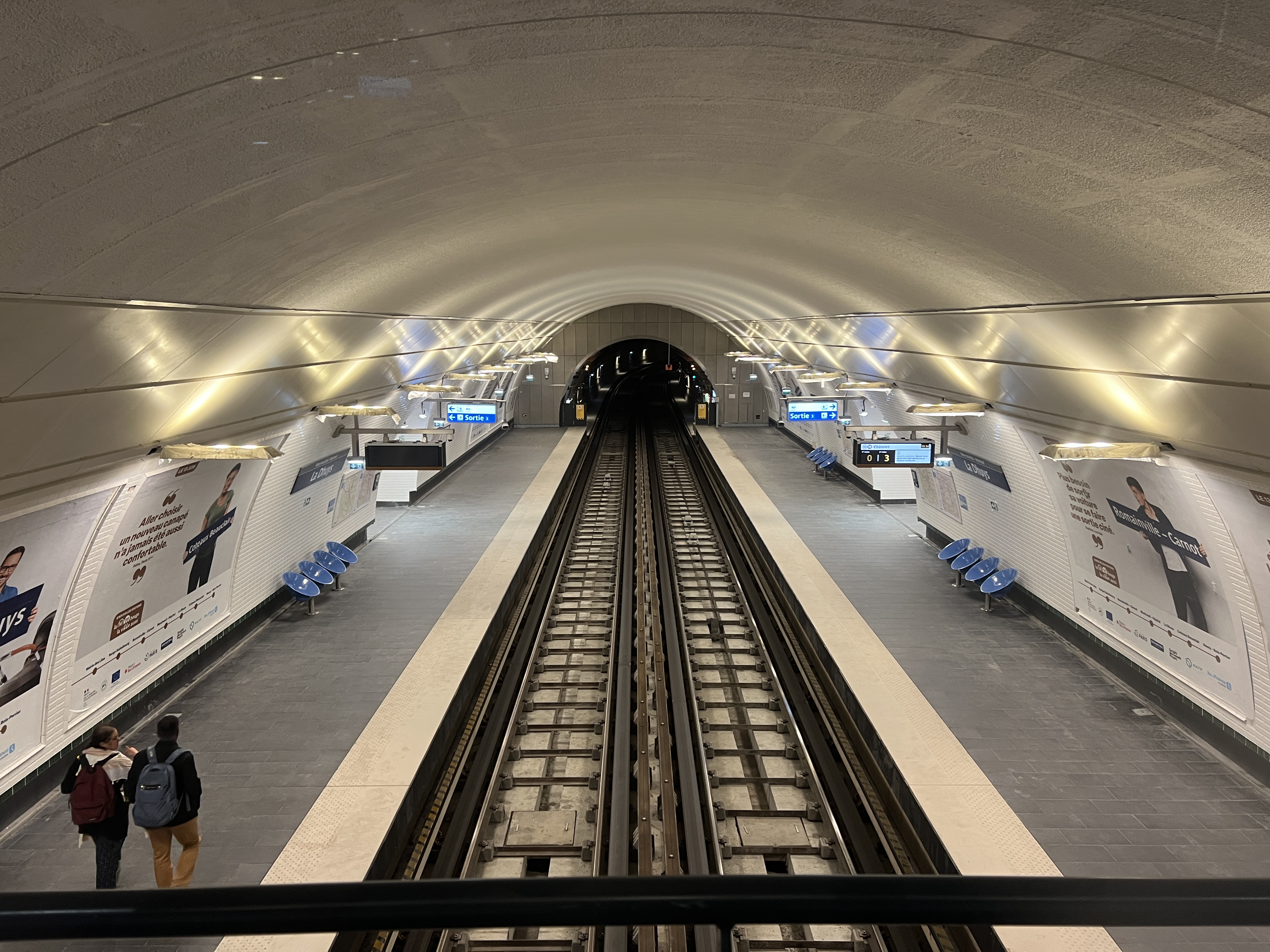
- Platforms on opening day

General information
- Location: Montreuil and Rosny-sous-Bois, Seine-Saint-Denis; Île-de-France; France
- Coordinates: 48°52′39″N 2°27′54″E
- Owner: RATP
- Operator: RATP
- Line: Paris Metro Paris Metro Line 11
- Platforms: 2 (2 side platforms)
- Tracks: 2

Construction
- Depth: 25 m
- Accessible: Yes
- Architect: Richez Associés

History
- Opened: 13 June 2024

Services
Preceding station	Paris Metro	Following station
Montreuil–Hôpital towards Châtelet	Line 11	Coteaux Beauclair towards Rosny–Bois-Perrier
Location
- Location within Paris and inner ring

La Dhuys station (French pronunciation: [la dɥis]) is a station on Line 11 of the Paris Metro. It is situated in the communes of Montreuil and Rosny-sous-Bois.

== History ==
The station opened on 13 June 2024 as part of the extension of the line from Serge Gainsbourg to Rosny–Bois-Perrier.

The station was initially given the provisional name of La Boissière. It was then renamed La Dhuys, after the nearby rue de la Dhuys, itself named after La Dhuis, a river in Aisne, France. The river has since been channeled into the Dhuis aqueduct since 1 October 1865 to supply water to Paris.

The RATP under its subsidiary Logis Transports, together with architects Richez Associés, will build a new social housing project over the station, with one of its accesses integrated into the building structure.

=== Construction ===
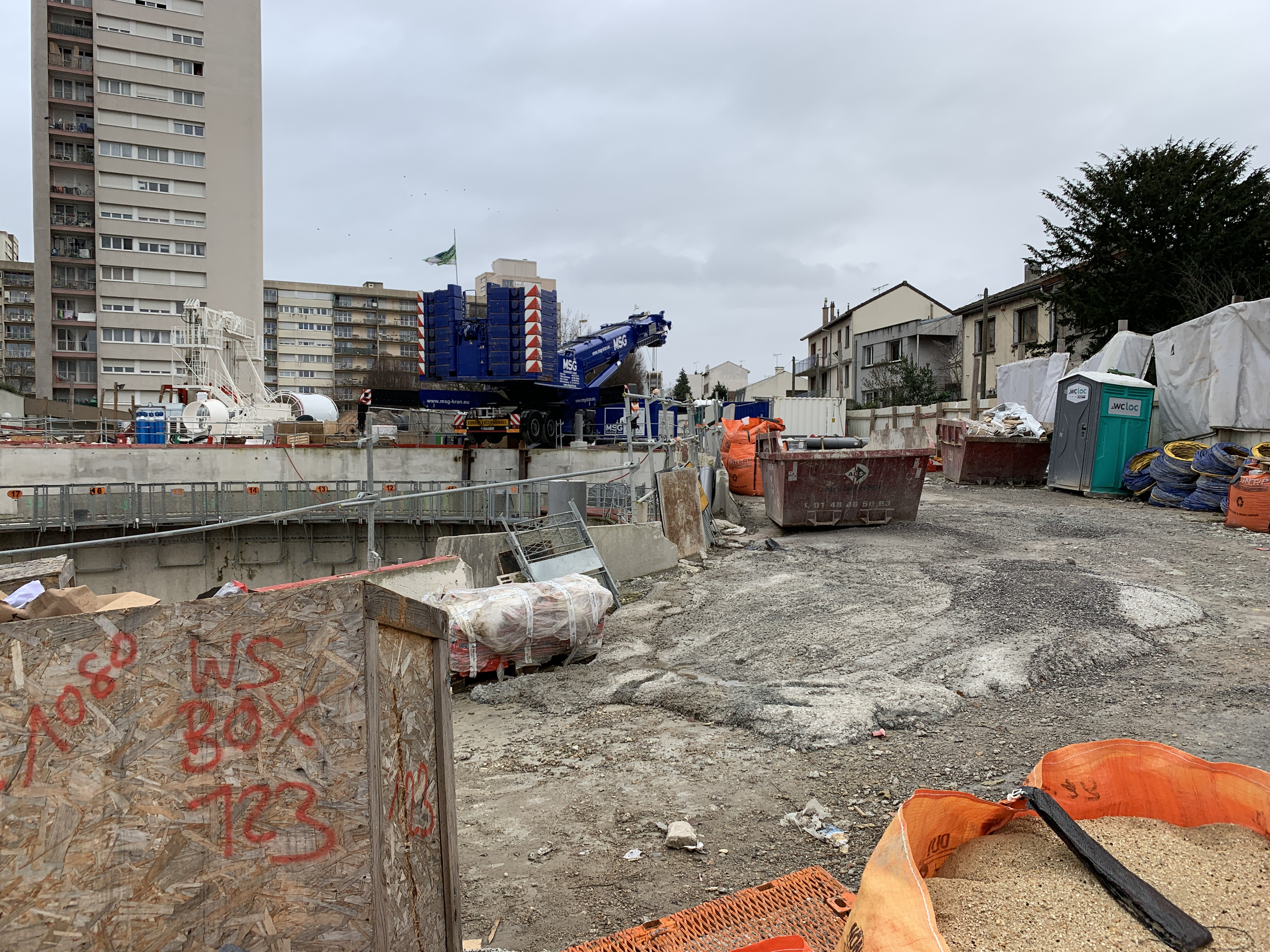
Construction in 2019.

The station was designed by architects Richez Associés, who also designed 3 other stations on the extension. It was designed to have elements similar to the original design of the metro stations, such as bevelled white tiling, a platform vault, and a side platform layout.

Originally meant to be built in the open, work was carried out underground instead from a circular access shaft after public inquiries were carried out in order to preserve the neighbouring residential complexes, with civil work beginning in November 2016. Excavation of the station's cavern started in April 2018, providing the space required for the assembly of the tunnel boring machine, Sofia, which started in July 2019.

In 2021, excavation and civil works, apart from that of access 3, were completed. Tunnel works were also completed with the arrival of the tunnel boring machine at Serge Gainsbourg, with the dismantling of the cement plants and removal of cranes from the site occurring soon after.

== Passenger services ==
=== Access ===
The station has three accesses:

- Access 1: rue Lucien Piron
- Access 2: rue de la Dhuys
- Access 3: Boulevard de la Boissière

=== Station layout ===
Street Level
B1	Mezzanine
Line 11 platforms	Side platform, doors will open on the right
Line 11 platforms	Westbound	← toward Châtelet (Montreuil–Hôpital)
Line 11 platforms	Eastbound	toward Rosny–Bois-Perrier (Coteaux Beauclair) →
Line 11 platforms	Side platform, doors will open on the right

=== Platforms ===
The station has a standard configuration with 2 tracks surrounded by 2 side platforms.

== Other connections ==
The station is also served by lines 102, 124, 202, and 301 of the RATP bus network, and by line 1 of the Titus bus network.

== Gallery ==
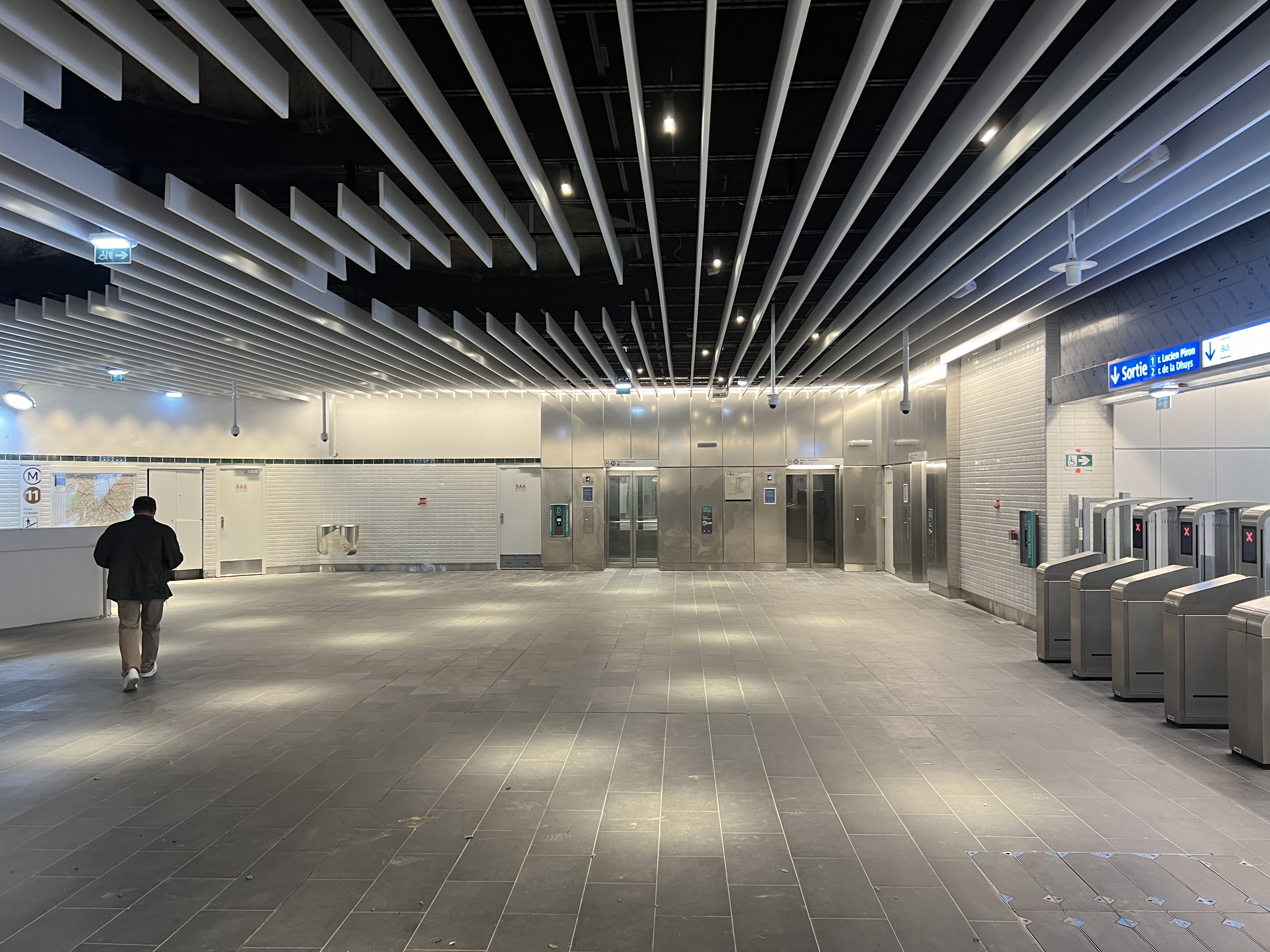
Mezzanine

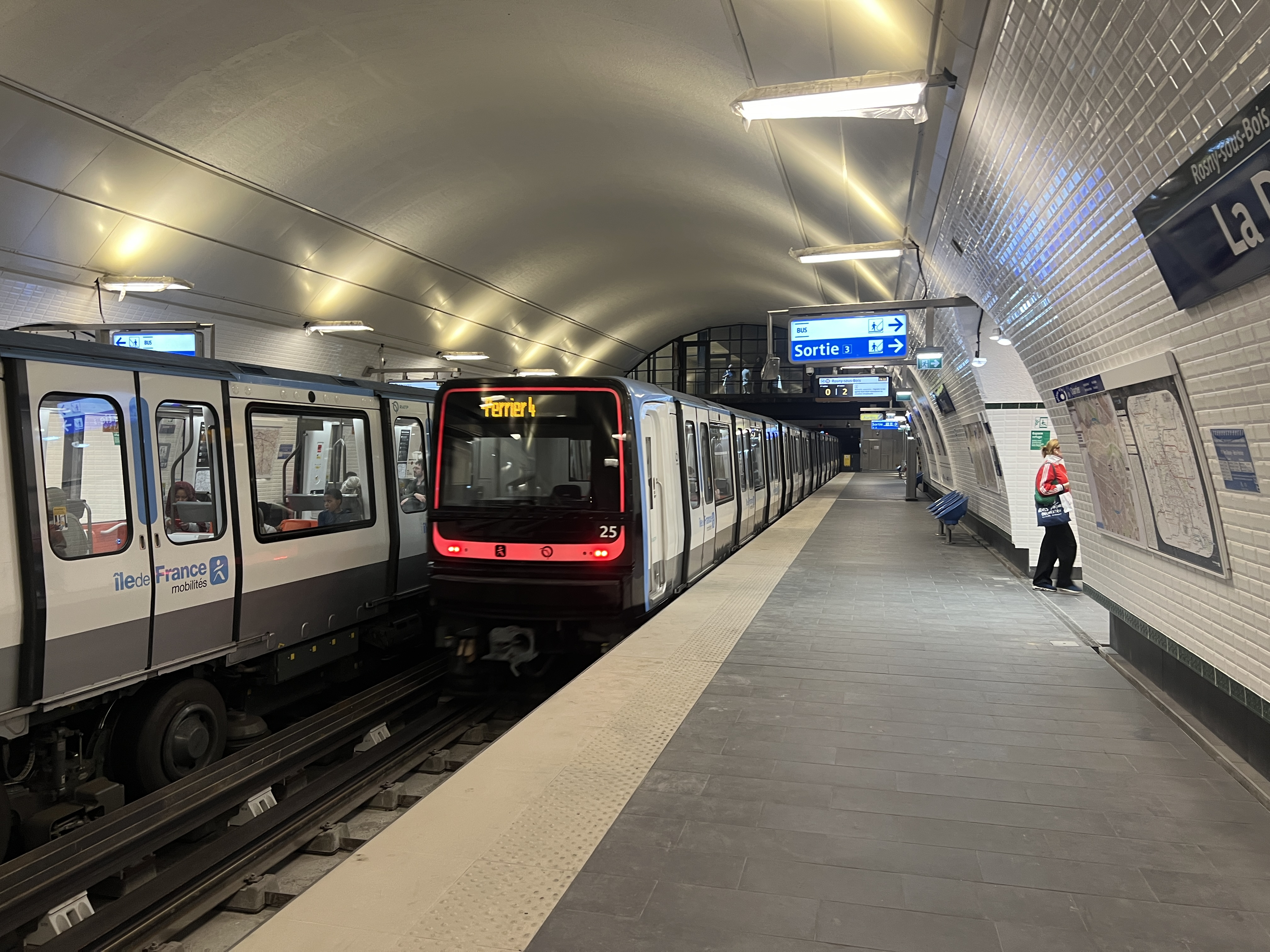
MP 14 at La Dhuys

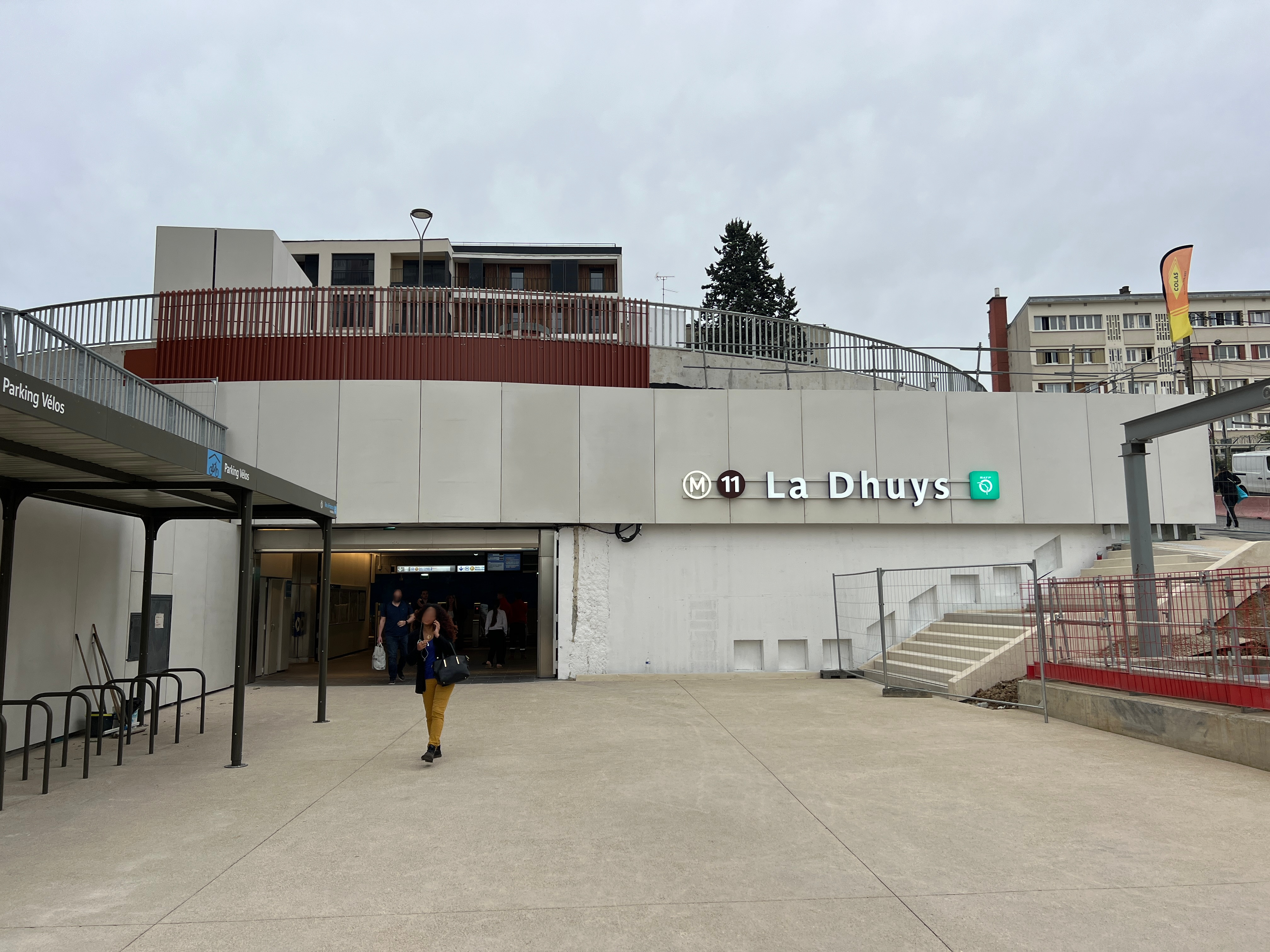
Accesses 1 & 2

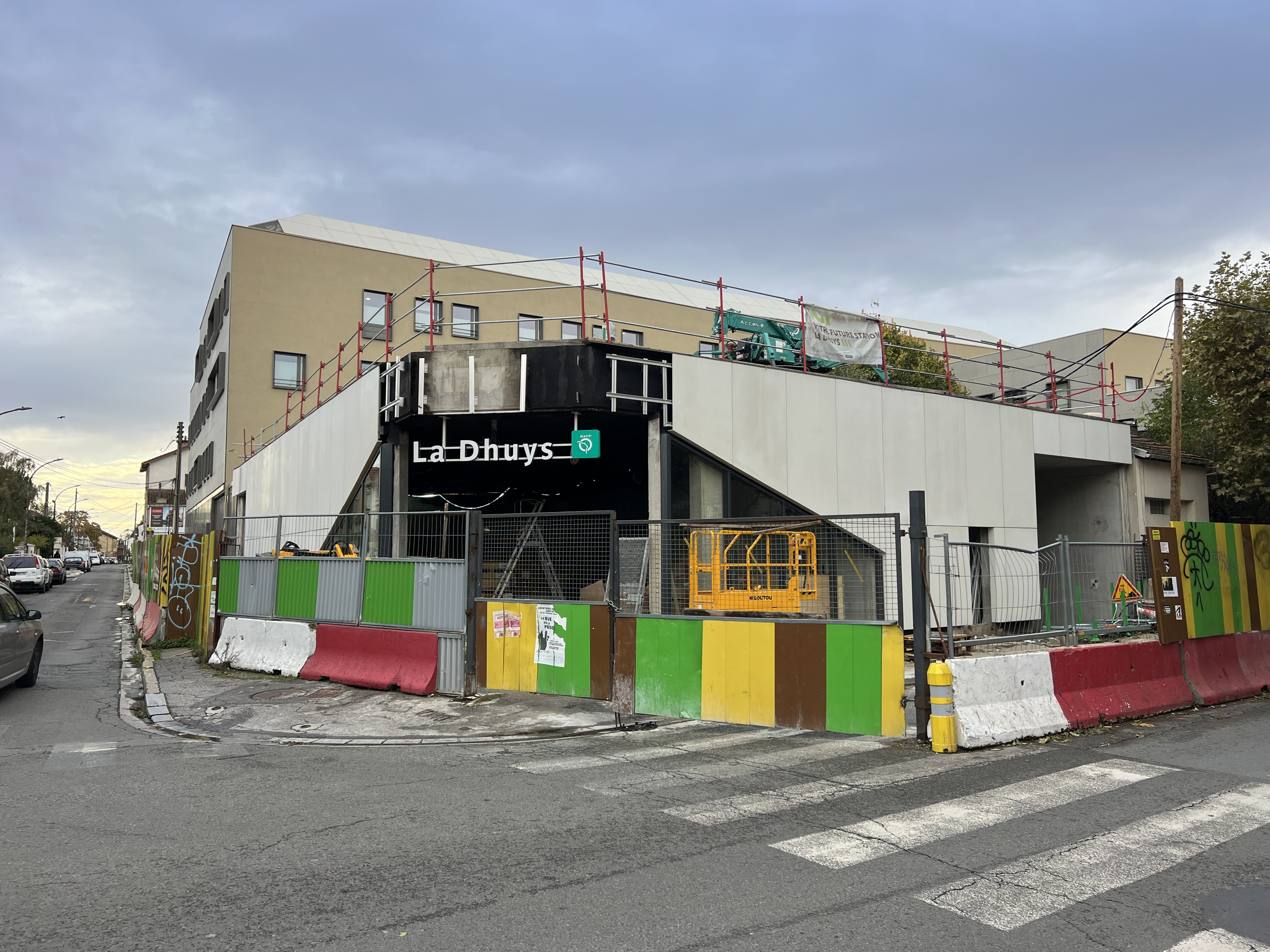
Access 3 under construction in 2023
