= Montreuil–Hôpital station =

Metro station in Paris, France

Montreuil–Hôpital
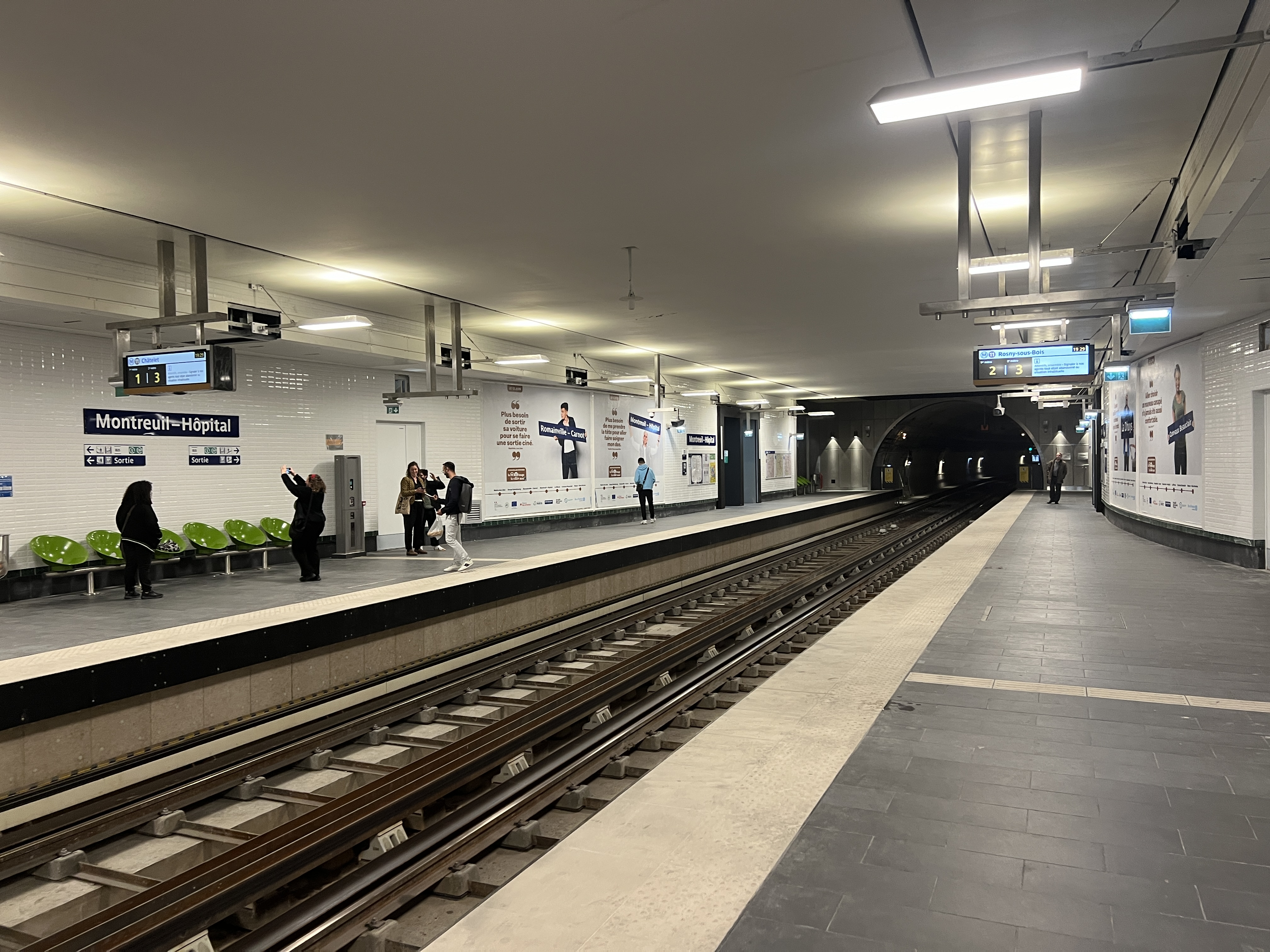
- Platforms on opening day (June 2024)

General information
- Location: Montreuil, Seine-Saint-Denis; Île-de-France; France
- Coordinates: 48°52′42″N 2°27′17″E
- Owner: RATP
- Operator: RATP
- Line: Paris Metro Paris Metro Line 11
- Platforms: 2 side platforms
- Tracks: 2

Construction
- Accessible: Yes
- Architect: Richez Associés

History
- Opened: 13 June 2024

Services
Preceding station	Paris Metro	Following station
Romainville–Carnot towards Châtelet	Line 11	La Dhuys towards Rosny–Bois-Perrier

Future services
Preceding station	Paris Metro	Following station
Aristide Briand towards Pont de Sèvres	Line 9	Terminus
Location
- Location within Paris and inner ring

Montreuil–Hôpital station (French pronunciation: [mɔ̃tʁœj opital]) is a station on Line 11 of the Paris Metro. The station serves the André Grégoire Hospital in Montreuil and opened on 13 June 2024. An extension of Line 9 to the station is planned with an unknown date of completion.

The station was designed by architects Richez Associés, who also designed 3 other stations on the extension.

== Location ==
The station is located under the Boulevard de la Boissière and the site of the André Grégoire Hospital, spanning the length between the main entrance to the hospital and the Rue des Saules Clouet. The station is oriented east-west and is located on the border between the communes of Montreuil and Noisy-le-Sec in the eastern suburbs of Paris.

== History ==
In the late 2000s, a six station extension of Line 11 from Mairie des Lilas to Rosny-Bois-Perrier was officially undertaken by the Île-de-France region. The project was amended in February 2011 to open the line all at once and to match the route and stations as they are today, and the project's details and financement were finalized in 2015. The project was declared of public utility on 28 May 2014 with structural work beginning on 10 December 2016. At that time, the line's opening was scheduled for 2023.

The station was constructed using cut and cover in two sections (north and south). The northern section was also used to construct an electrical substation.

The station was opened for service on 13 June 2024 as part of Line 11's extension to Rosny-Bois-Perrier, one of many new transport projects of the Grand Paris Express.

== Passenger services ==
=== Entrances ===
The station has two entrances, both on the southern side of the Boulevard de la Boissière in Montreuil.

- Entrance #1: "Rue des Saules Clouet"
  - Main station building
  - Two elevators, two escalators, and a large staircase
  - Mezzanine contains kiosks and ticketing services
- Entrance #2: "Boulevard de la Boissière"
  - Two staircases and one escalator

=== Station layout ===
Street Level
B1	Mezzanine
Line 11 platforms	Side platform, doors will open on the right
Line 11 platforms	Westbound	← toward Châtelet (Romainville-Carnot)
Line 11 platforms	Eastbound	toward Rosny–Bois-Perrier (La Dhuys) →
Line 11 platforms	Side platform, doors will open on the right

=== Platforms ===
Montreuil-Hôpital has two standard side platforms, located about 20 metres (66 ft) underground. The station's platforms are exactly the same as Serge Gainsbourg station, two stops to the west. However, the station's seats are green instead of red.

=== Connections ===
The station provides transfers to RATP bus routes 76 and 129, Ourcq bus route 301, and Titus bus route 1.

== Future projects ==
=== Line 9 extension from Mairie de Montreuil ===
An two-stop extension of Line 9 from Mairie de Montreuil to Montreuil-Hôpital has been proposed. The extension would pass through the center of Montreuil, making only one intermediate stop at Aristide Briand before terminating at Montreuil-Hôpital.

At the beginning of the 2010s, elected officials of Île-de-France mentioned the possibility of making Montreuil-Hôpital a transfer station by making it the terminus of Line 9. As a result, during the vote on the "Schéma directeur de la région Île-de-France" (SDRIF) in October 2013, an amendment which added an option for Line 9's extension as a replacement of a previously considered extension to Montreuil - Murs à Pêches was passed. The goal of the extension is to link the northern and southern sections of Montreuil and to provide more connections between lines.

Since then, the project has not been further discussed. No estimated opening date has been published or provided.

=== Line 3 extension from Gallieni ===
An extension of Line 3 from Gallieni to Montreuil-Hôpital has also been proposed in the SDRIF-E 2040. No concrete plans for extension have been announced.

== Gallery ==
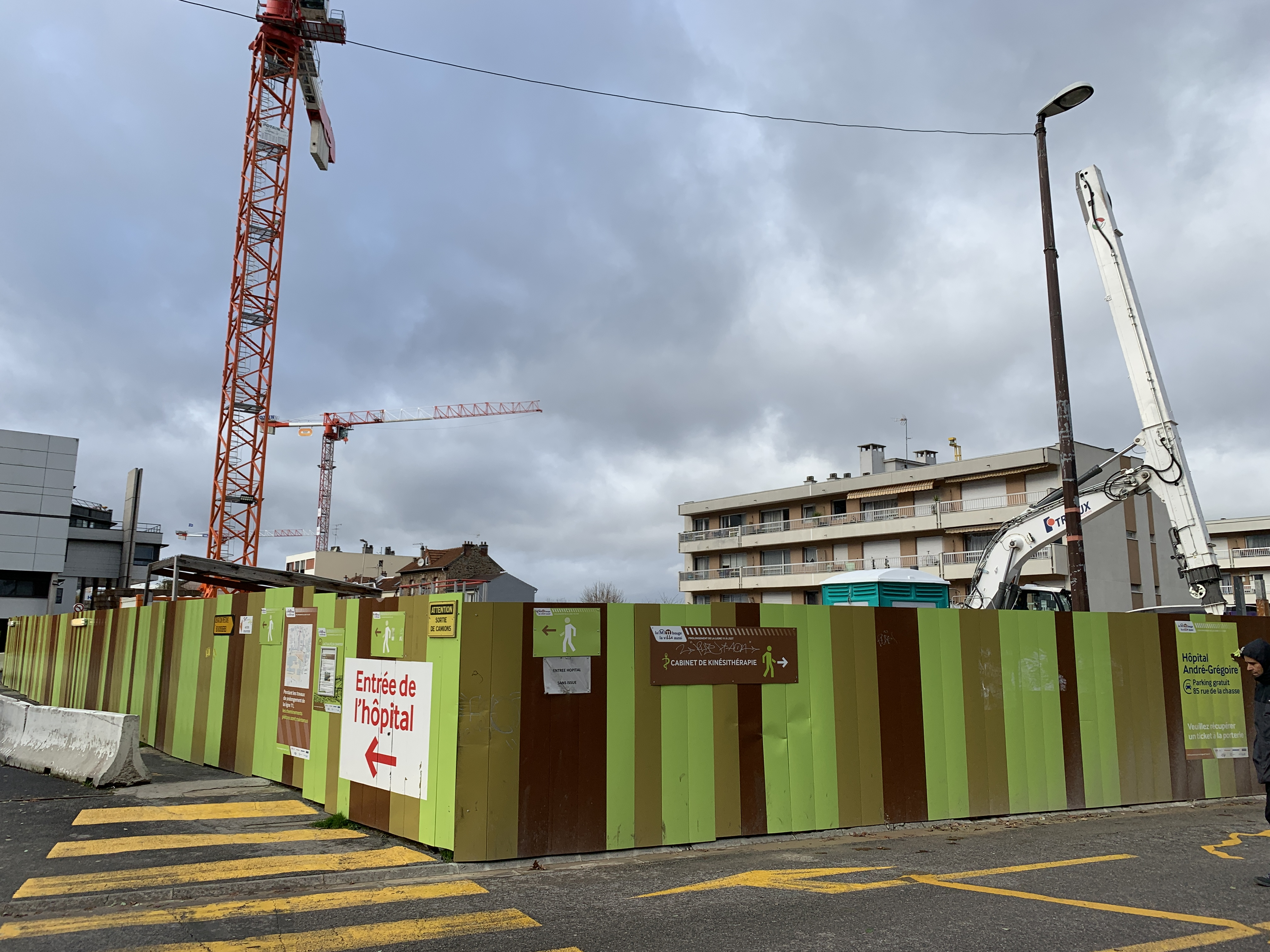
Construction of the station (2019)

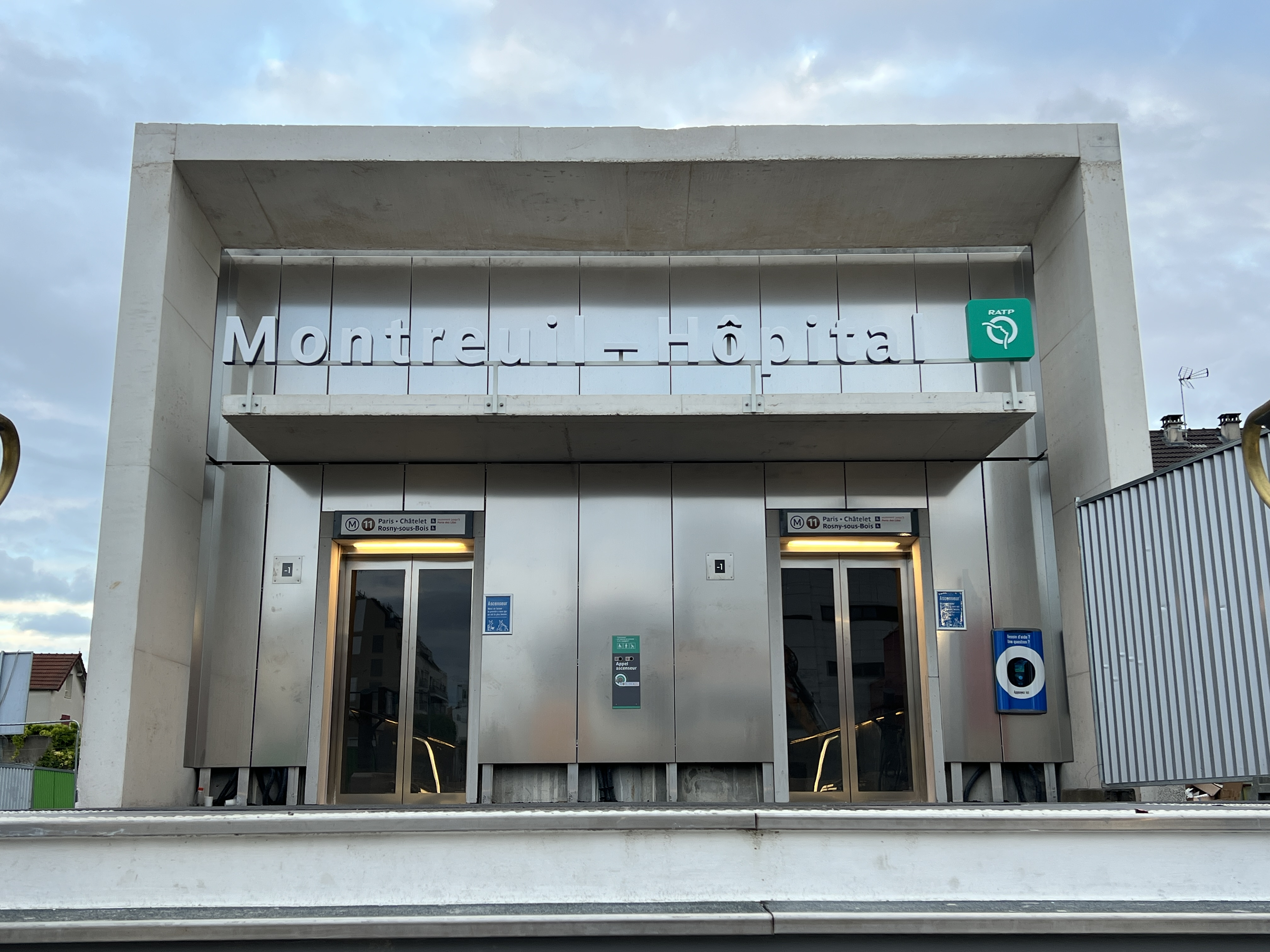
Entrance #1: "Rue des Saules Clouets" (elevators)

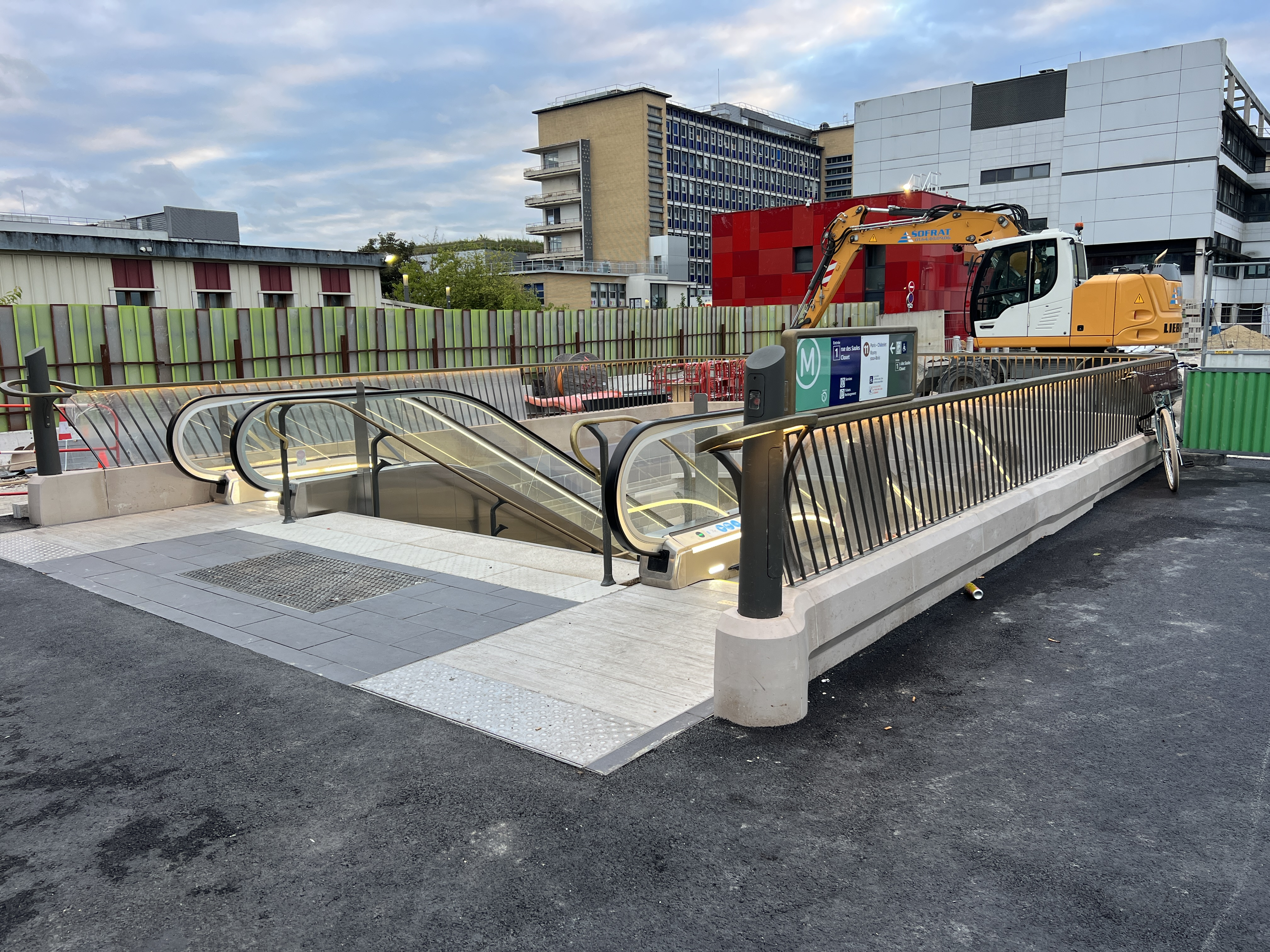
Entrance #1: "Rue des Saules Clouets" (escalators/stairs)

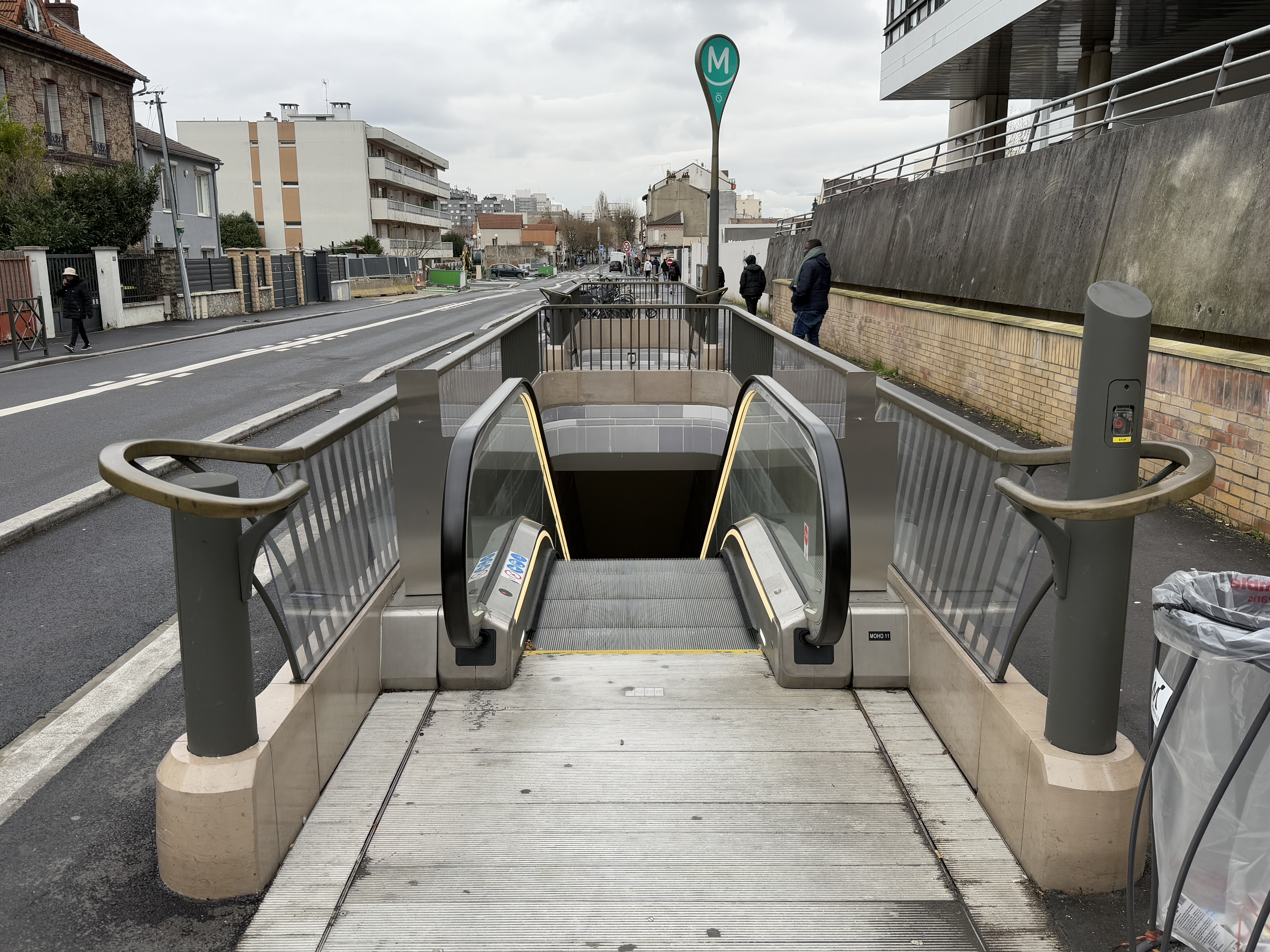
Entrance #2: "Boulevard de la Boissière"

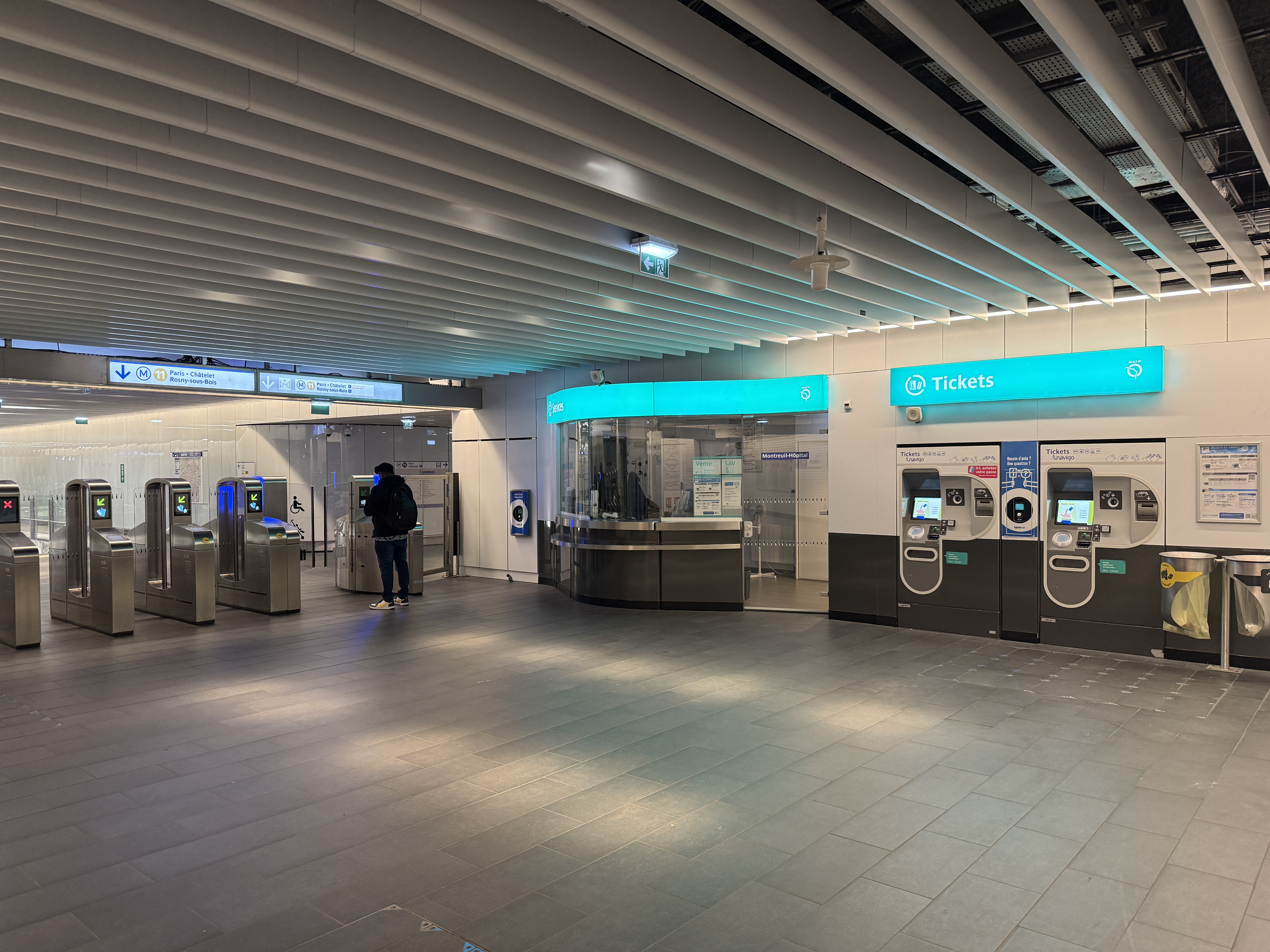
Fare gates and ticketing area

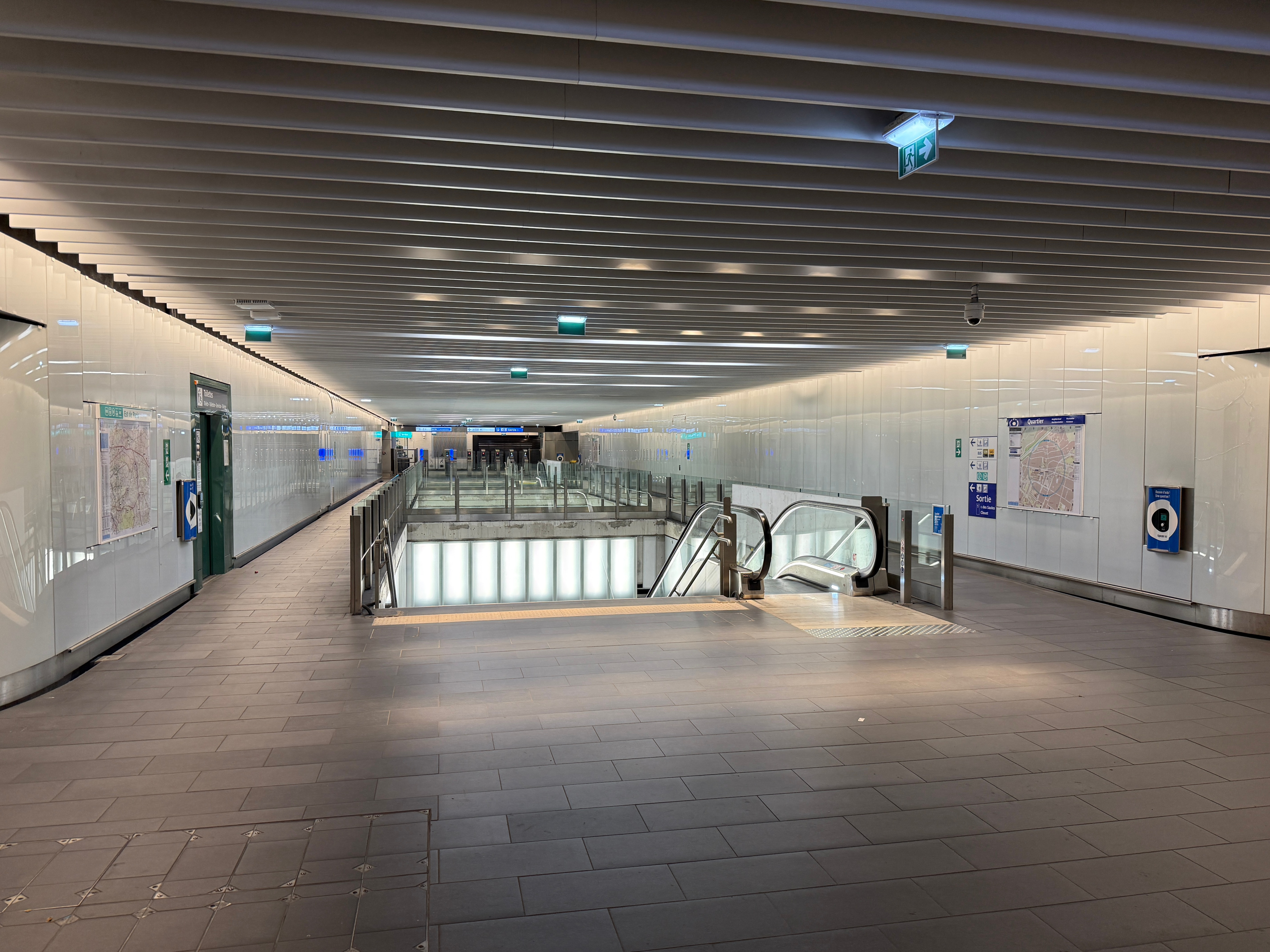
Station mezzanine

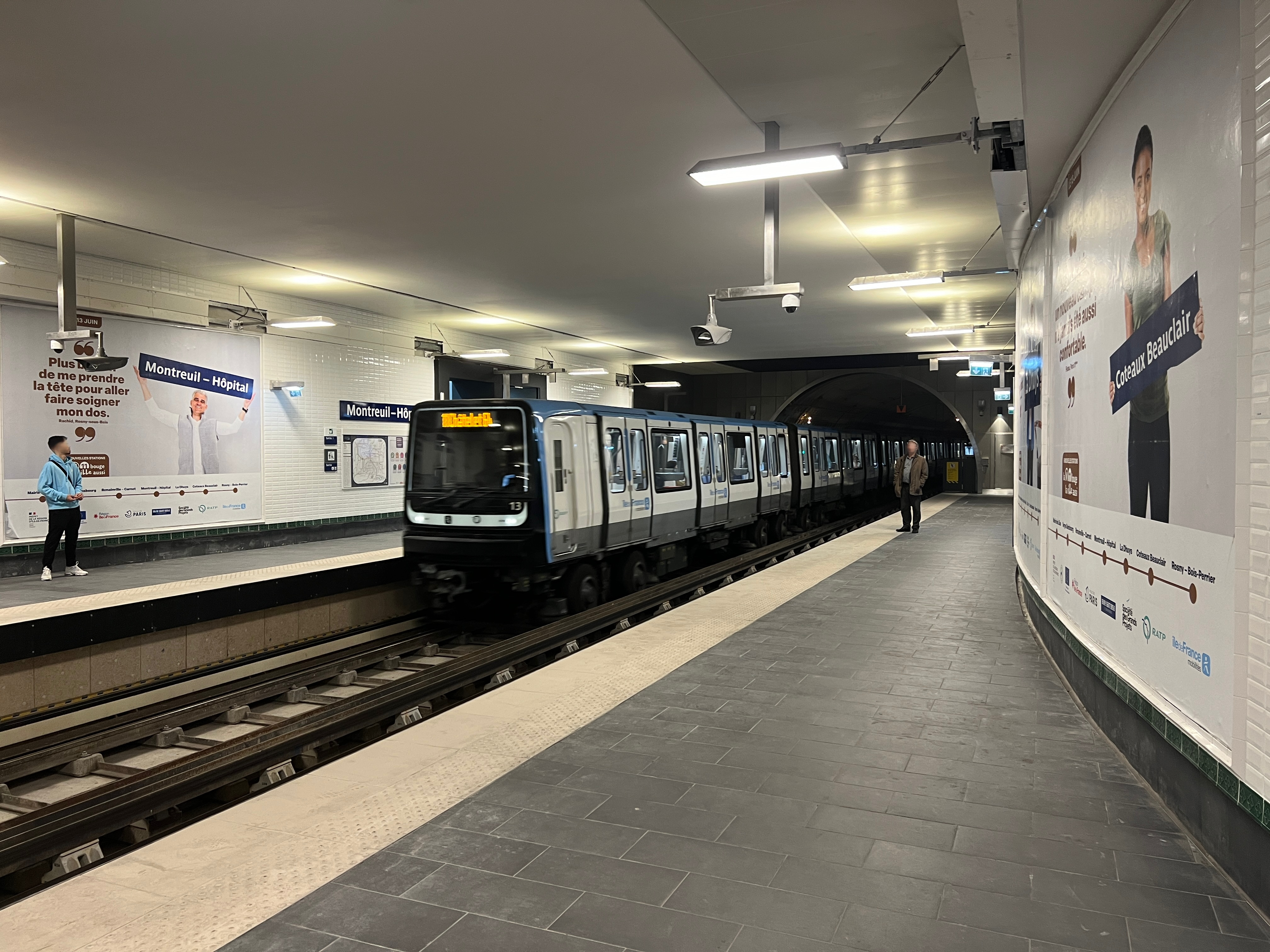
Platforms with a train on the westbound track

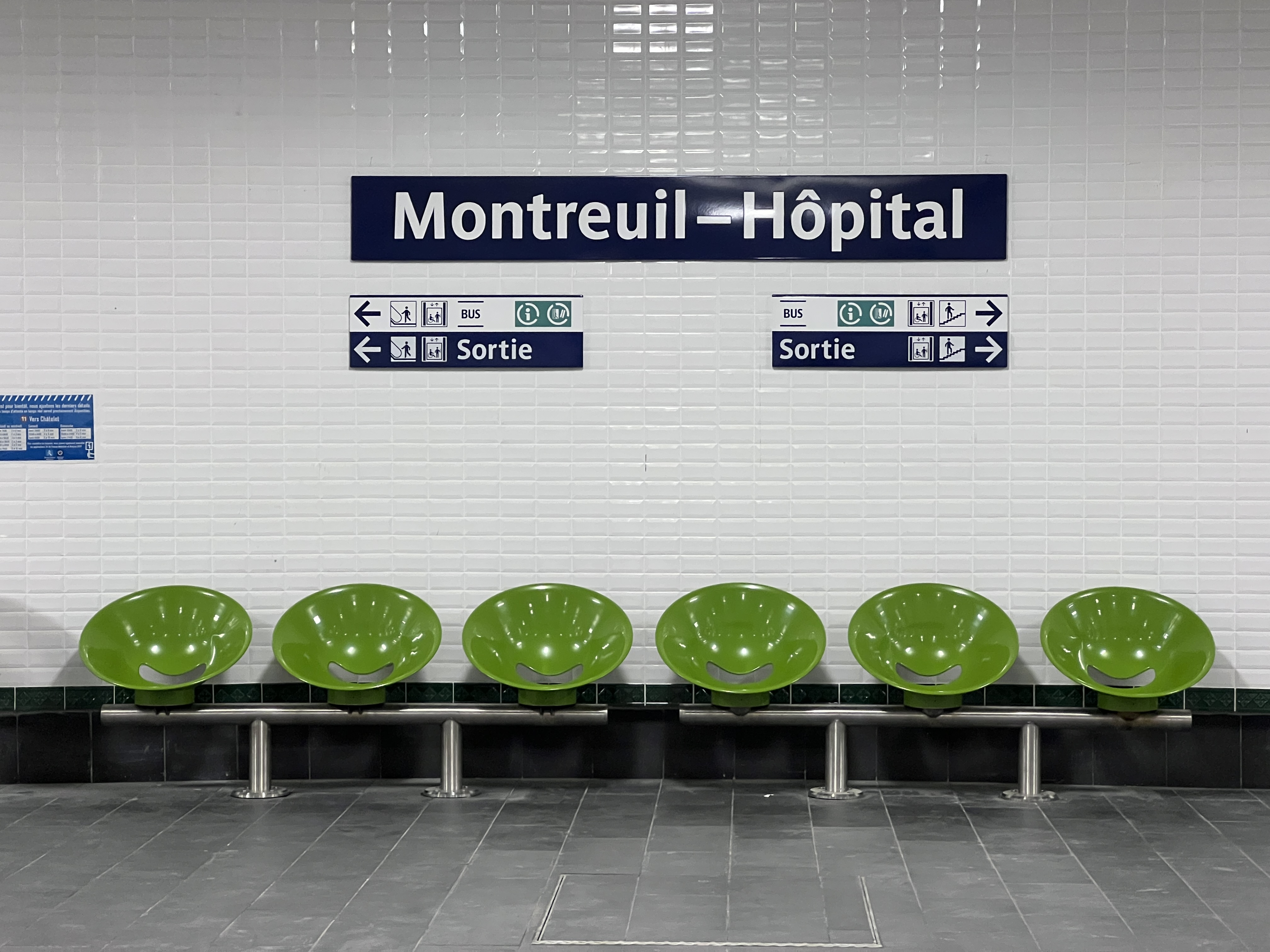
Station signage and Akiko-style seats

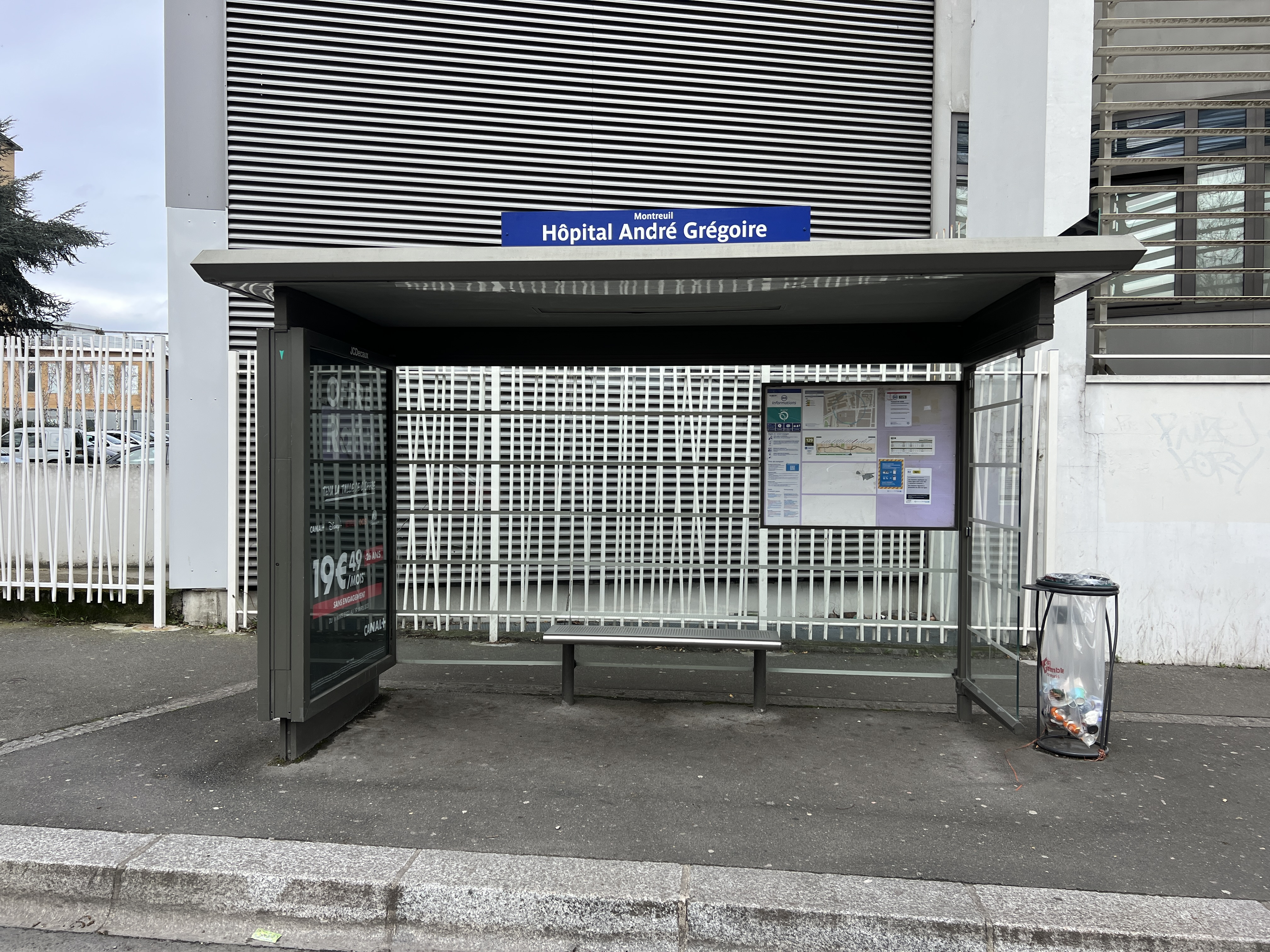
Bus shelter

== See also ==
- Montreuil-sous-Bois
- Grand Paris Express
