= Romainville–Carnot station =

Metro station in France

Romainville–Carnot
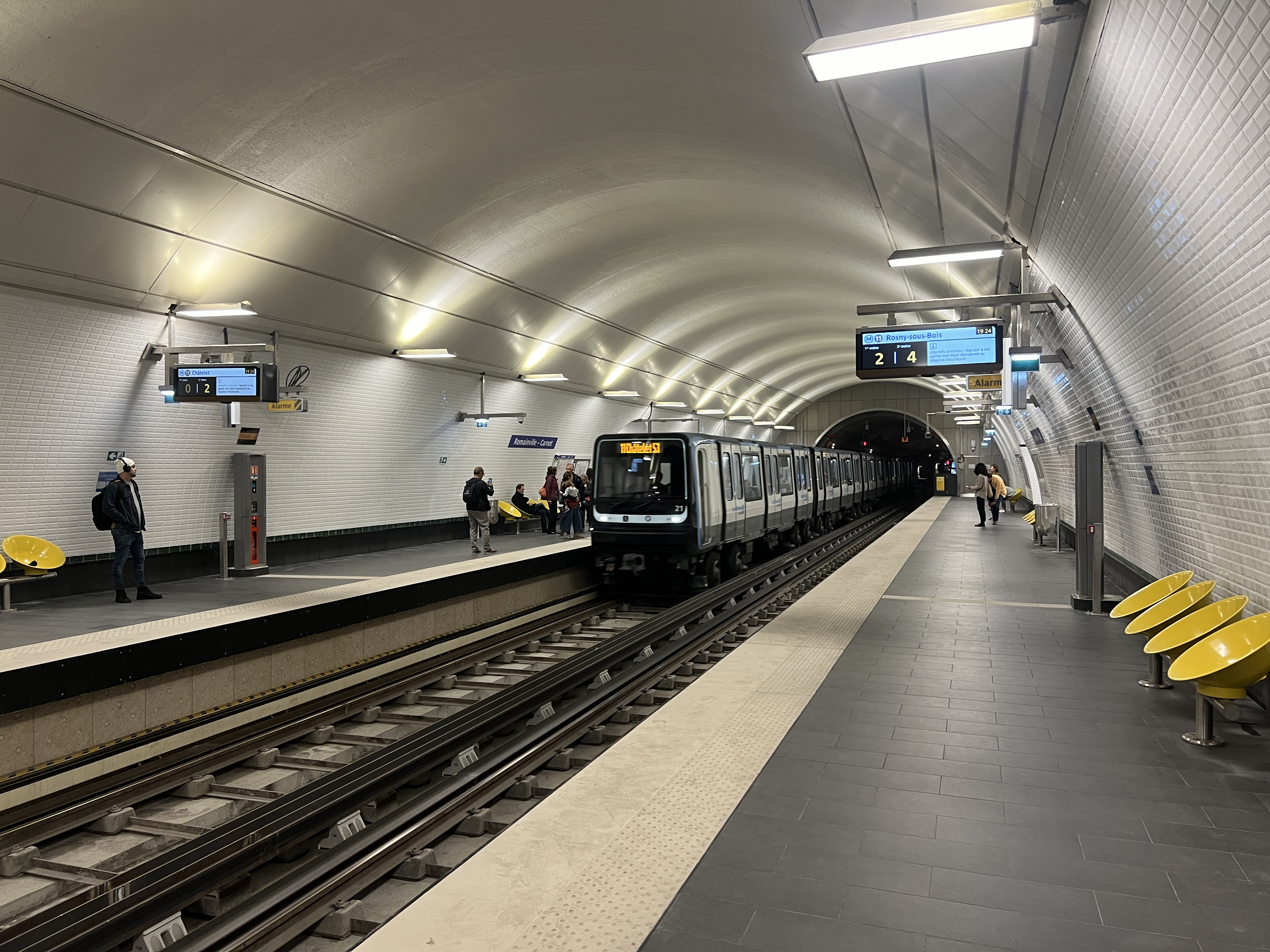
- Platforms on opening day

General information
- Location: Romainville, Seine-Saint-Denis; Île-de-France; France
- Coordinates: 48°53′00″N 2°26′27″E
- Owner: RATP
- Operator: RATP
- Line: Paris Metro Paris Metro Line 11
- Platforms: 2 side platforms
- Tracks: 2

Construction
- Structure type: Underground
- Depth: 26 m
- Accessible: Yes
- Architect: Richez Associés

Other information
- Fare zone: 3

History
- Opened: 13 June 2024

Services
Preceding station	Paris Metro	Following station
Serge Gainsbourg towards Châtelet	Line 11	Montreuil–Hôpital towards Rosny–Bois-Perrier
Location
- Location within Paris and inner ring

Romainville–Carnot station (French pronunciation: [ʁomɛ̃vil kaʁno]) is a station on Line 11 of the Paris Metro. The station is straddled between the communes of Romainville and Noisy-le-Sec.

== History ==
The station opened on 13 June 2024 as part of the extension of the line from Serge Gainsbourg to Rosny–Bois-Perrier. At a depth of 26 m, it is the deepest station on the extension.

The station was initially given the provisional name of Place Carnot, after the nearby Place Carnot located 60 m south of it. It was later officially named Romainville–Carnot by Île-de-France Mobilités (IDFM) on 27 April 2022.

Since the 1920s, it was planned that line 11 would be extended to Place Carnot from its then eastern terminus at Porte des Lilas. The station was designed by architects Richez Associés, who also designed 3 other stations on the extension, with civil works starting in May 2017. On 2 April 2021, the tunnel boring machine, Sofia, arrived at the station with excavation works for the station box completed 2 months later. Civil works on the underground portion of the station were completed at the end of 2021, with that of the surface portion completed by April 2022, with installation of equipment and fitting out soon after. Delays in its construction at the time threatened it opening together with the rest of the extension.

== Passenger services ==
=== Access ===
The station has 4 accesses:

- Access 1: Place Carnot
- Access 2: Boulevard Henri Barbusse
- Access 3: rue Carnot (with escalators)
- Access 4: rue Veuve Aublet

The main access (accesses 1 & 2) has two escalators and elevators; it is located at the corner of rue de la République and boulevard Henri Barbusse and is near the future site of the station of the planned extension of tramway T1.

=== Station layout ===
Street Level
B1	Mezzanine
Line 11 platforms	Side platform, doors will open on the right
Line 11 platforms	Westbound	← toward Châtelet (Serge Gainsbourg)
Line 11 platforms	Eastbound	toward Rosny–Bois-Perrier (Montreuil–Hôpital) →
Line 11 platforms	Side platform, doors will open on the right

=== Platforms ===
The station has a standard configuration with 2 tracks surrounded by 2 side platforms.

=== Other connections ===
The station is also served by lines 105, 129, 318, and 322 of the RATP bus network, and at night, by lines N12 and N23 of the Noctilien bus network. It will also be served by tramway T1 in the future when it is extended to Val de Fontenay.

== Gallery ==
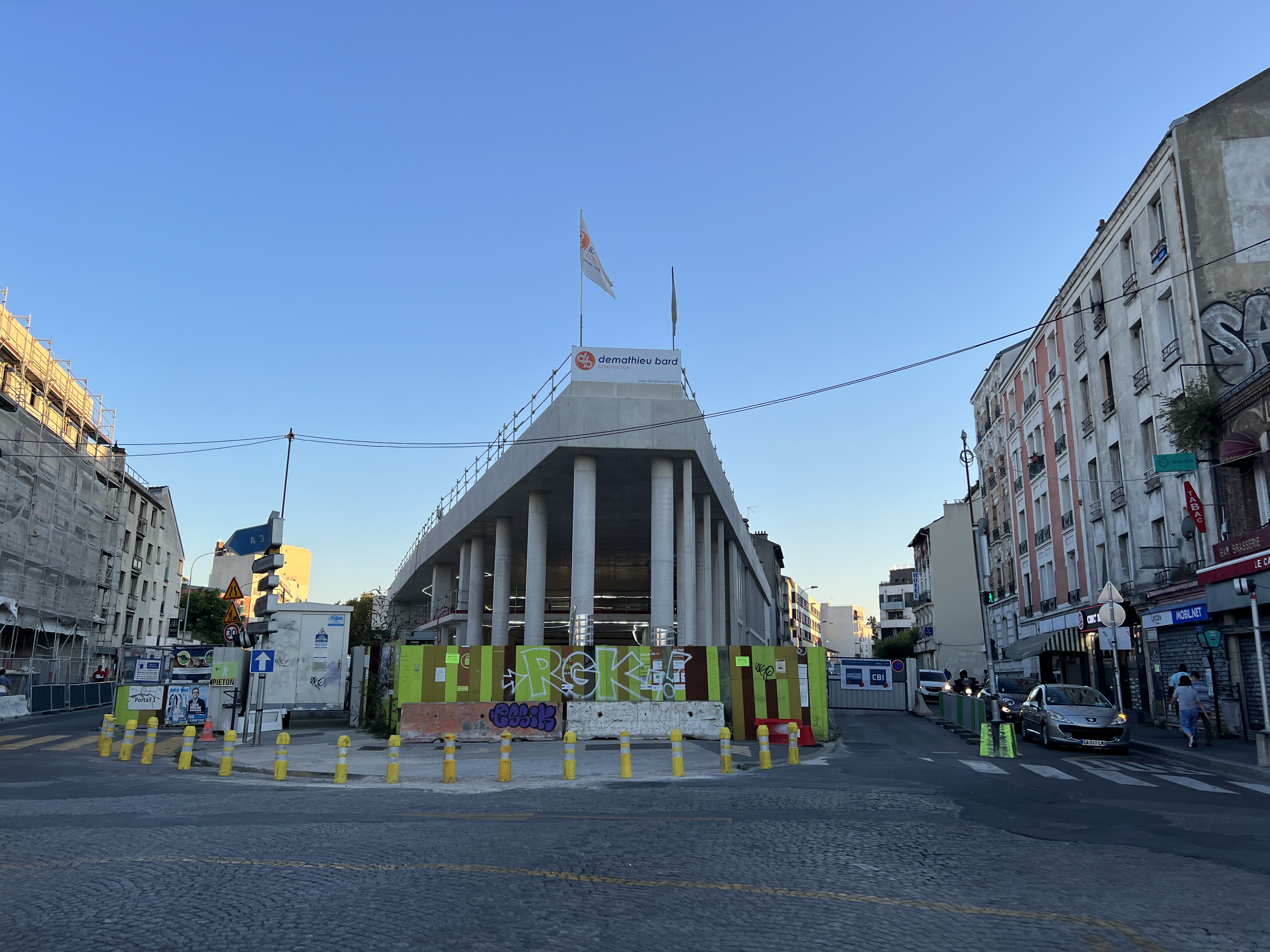
Construction of access 1 in 2022

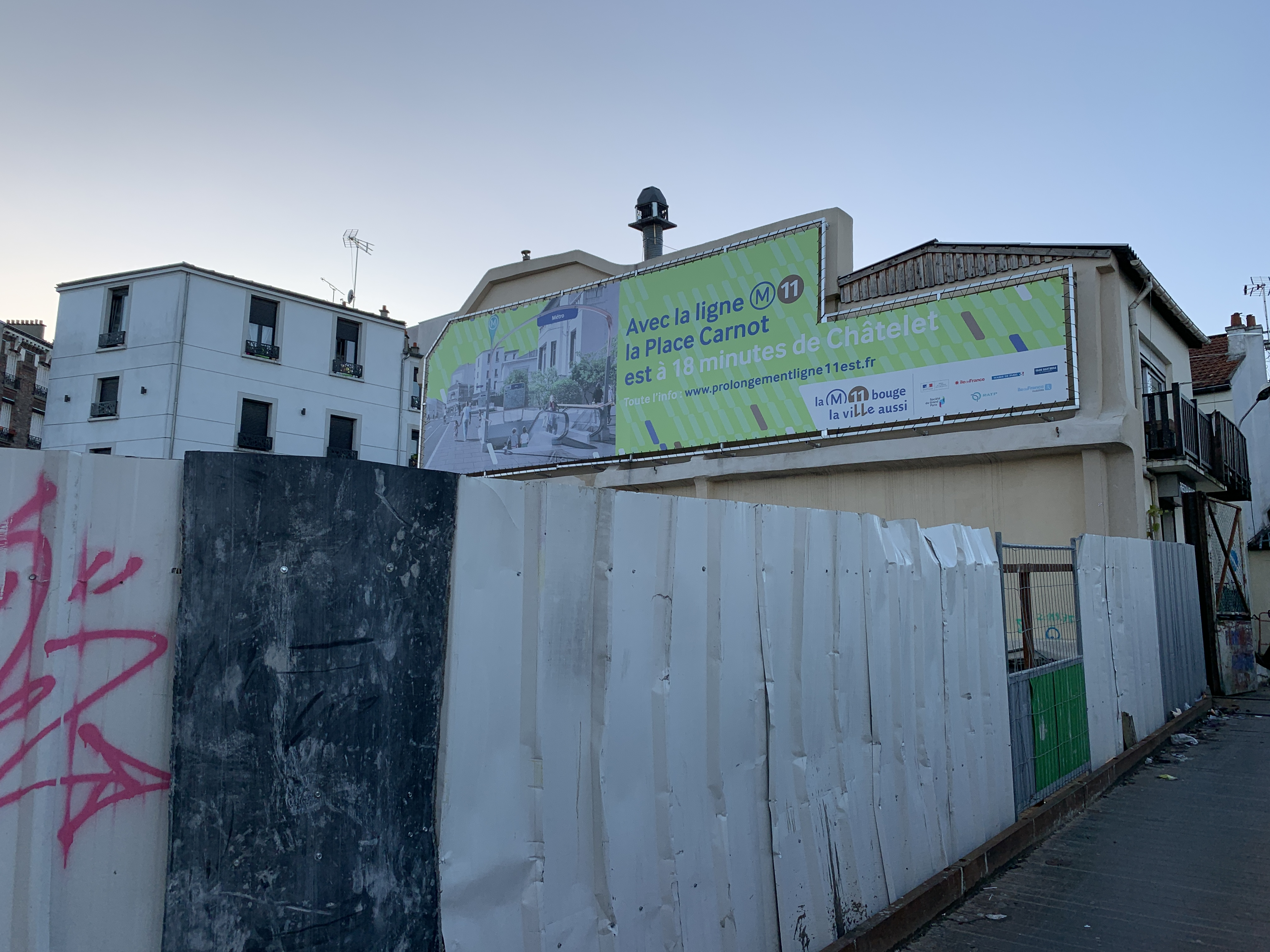
Construction of access 3 in Dec 2019

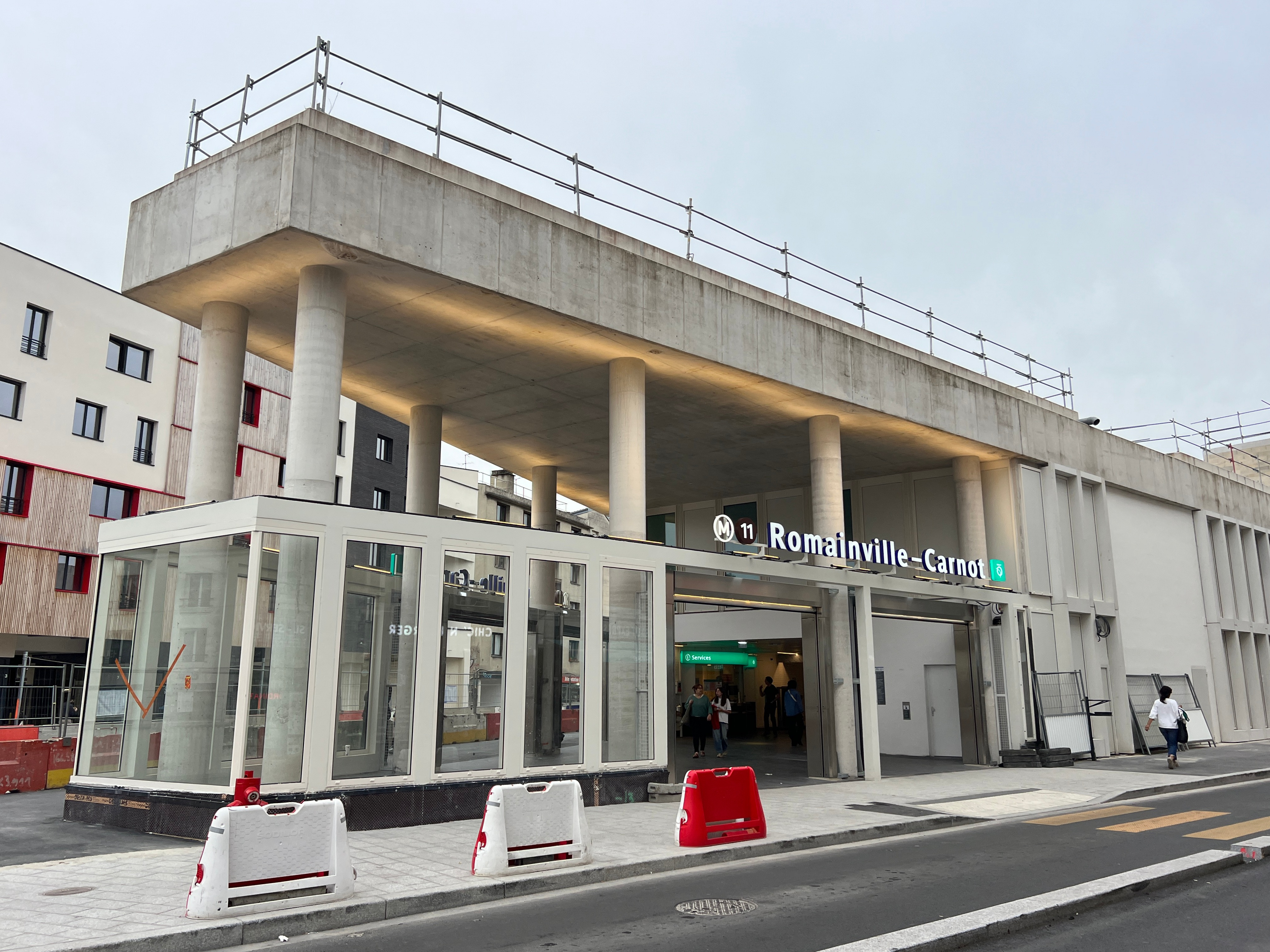
Access 1: "Place Carnot"

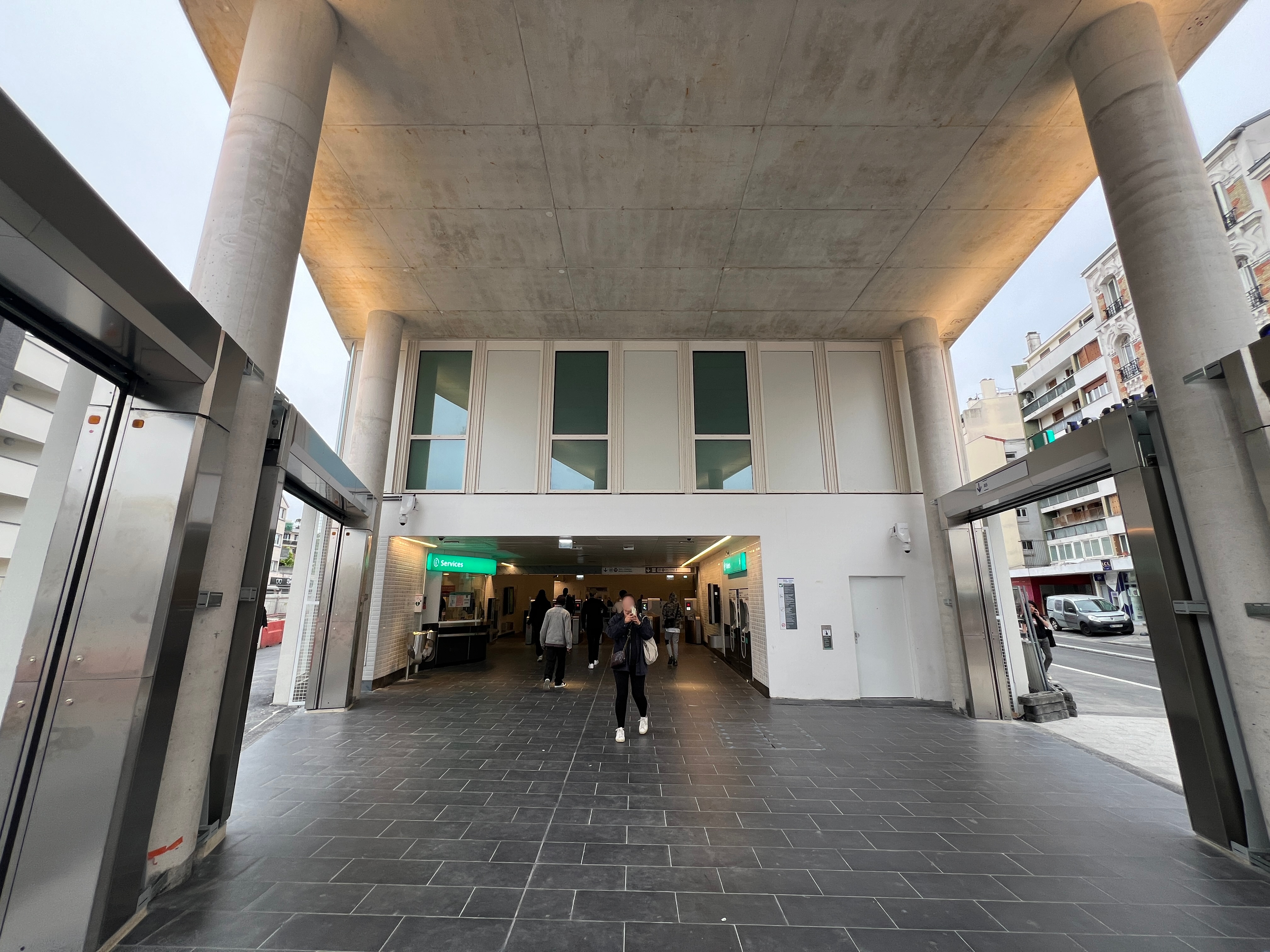
Inside access 1

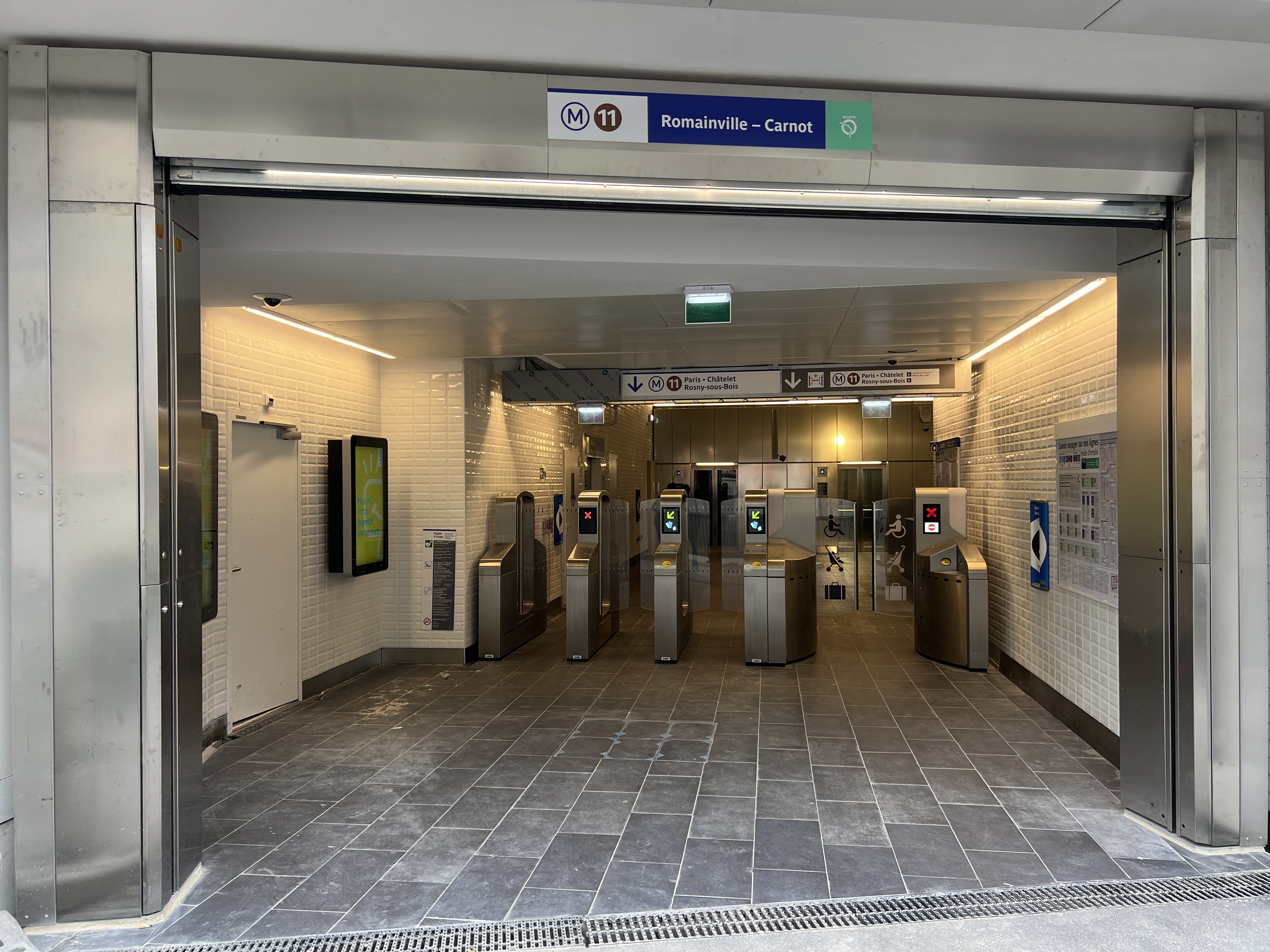
Access 2: "Boulevard Henri Barbusse"

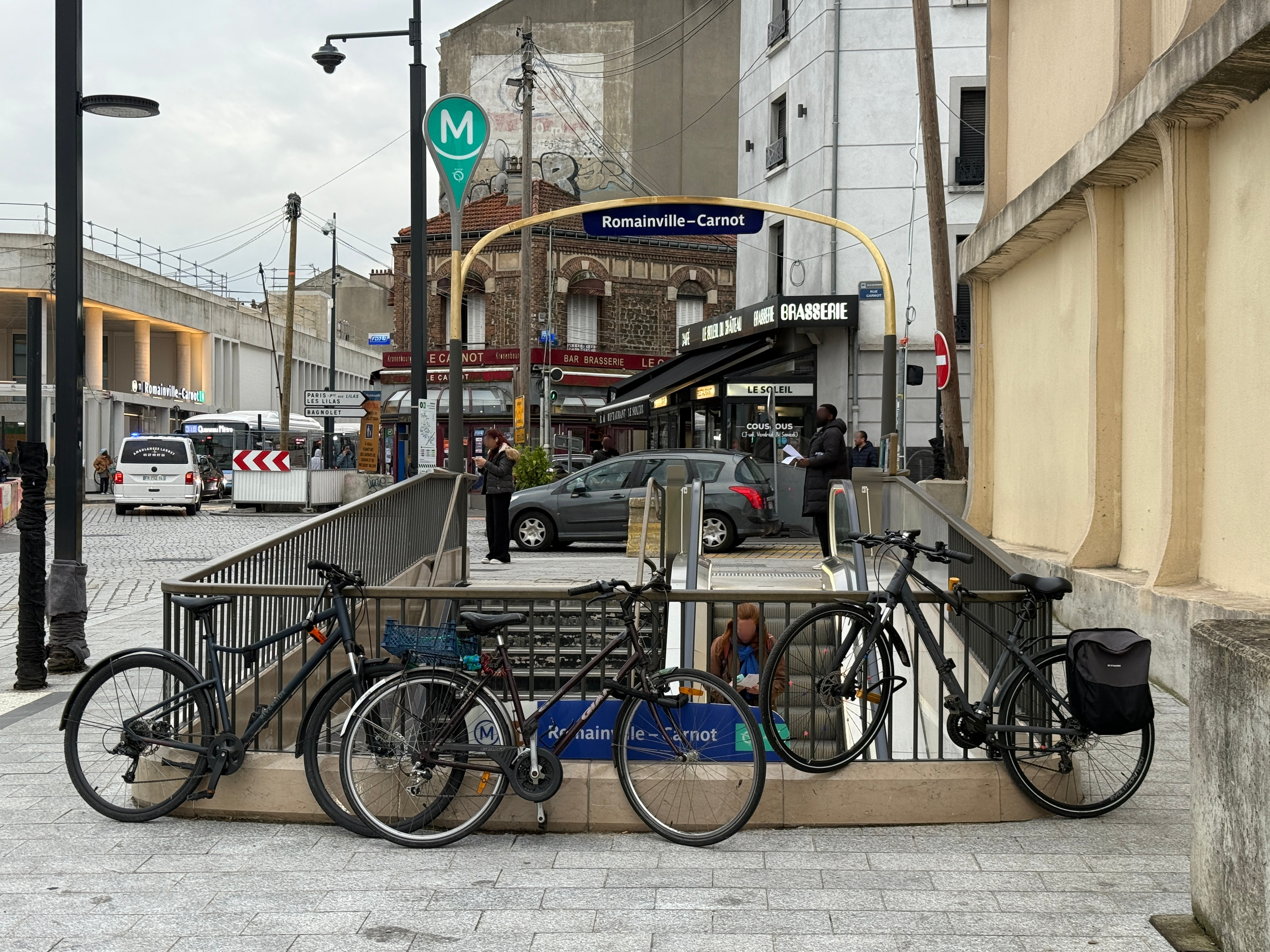
Access 3 "Rue Carnot"

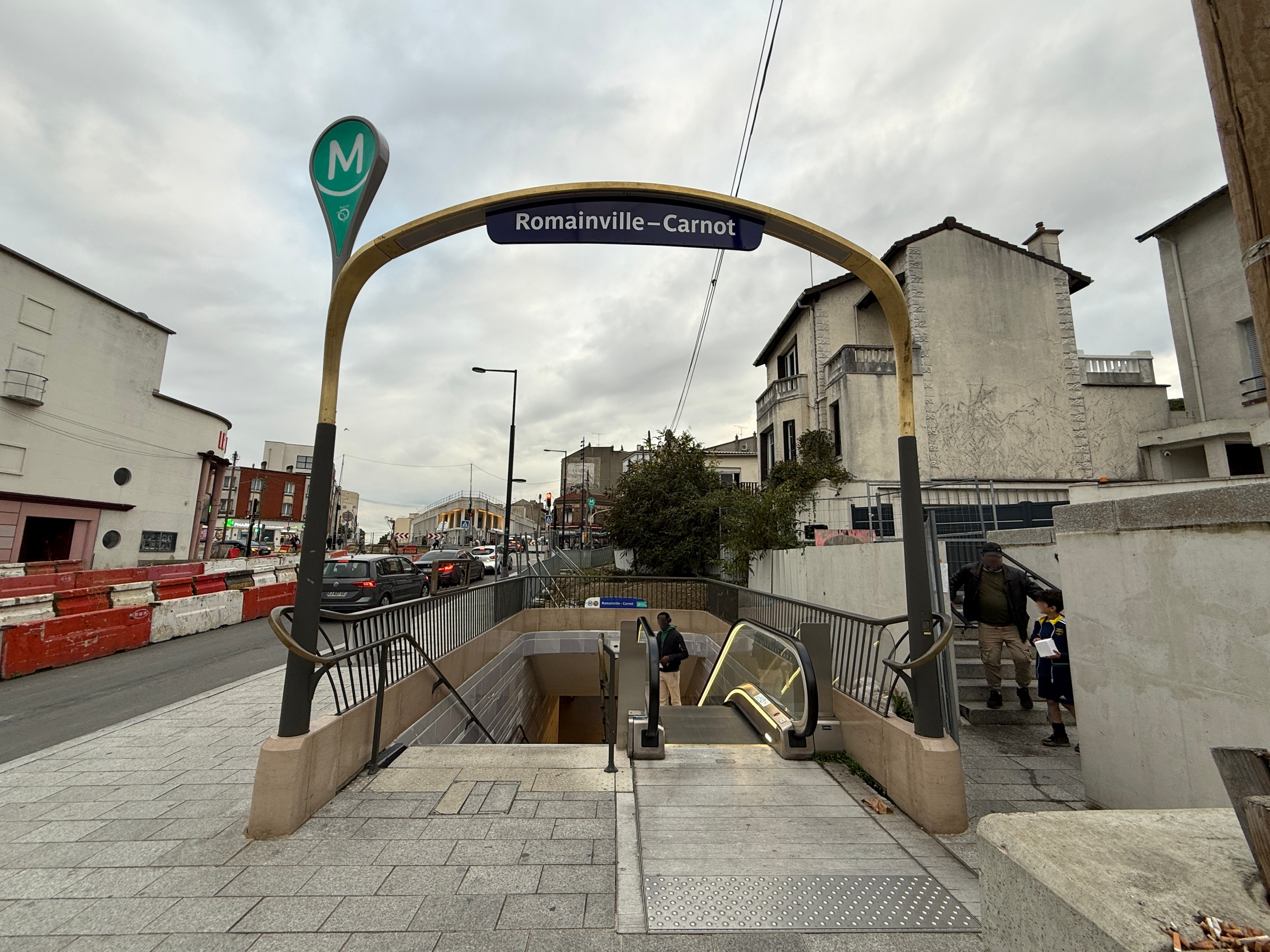
Access 4 "Rue Veuve Aublet"

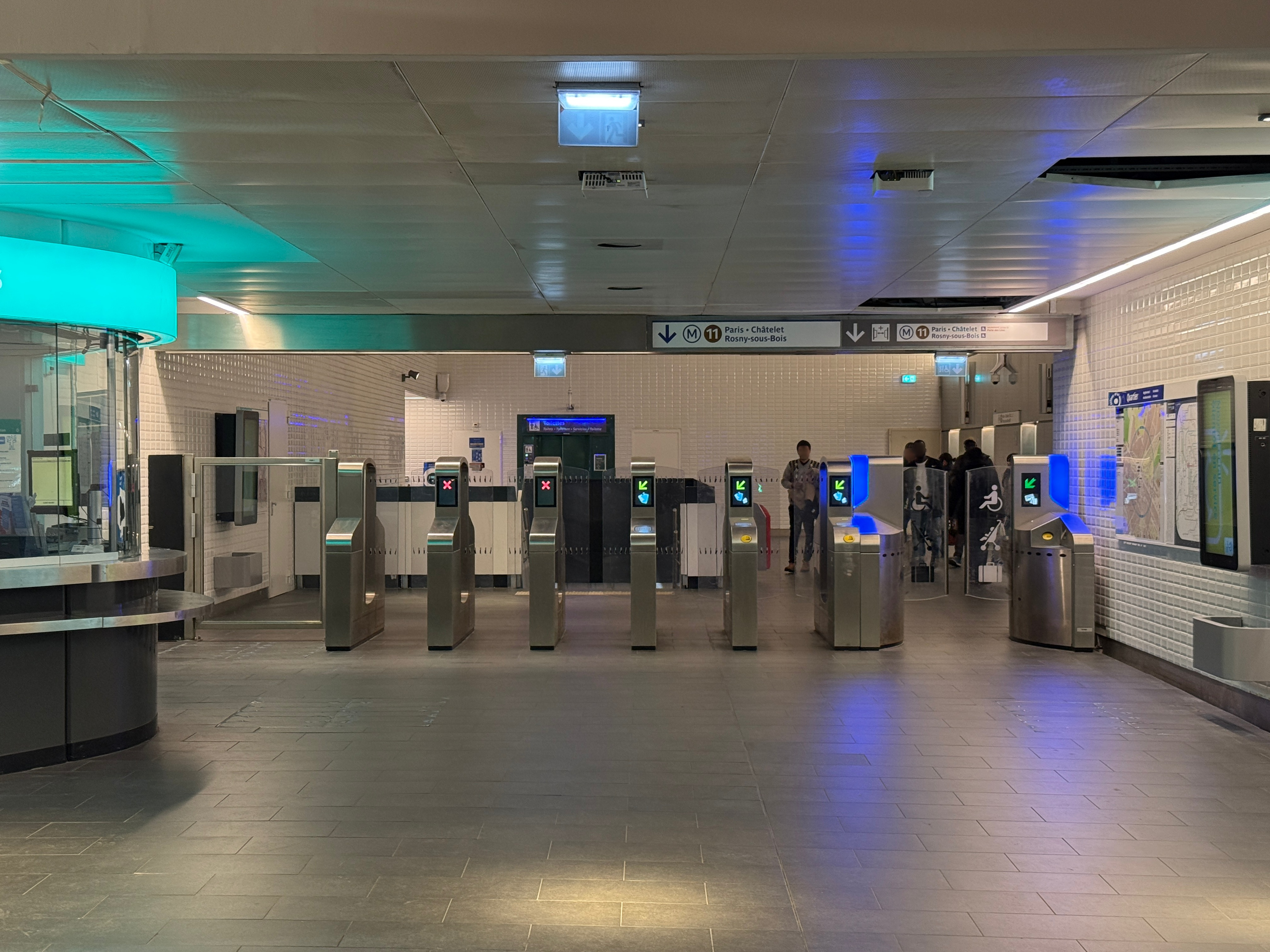
Main fare gates and ticket hall (from access 1)

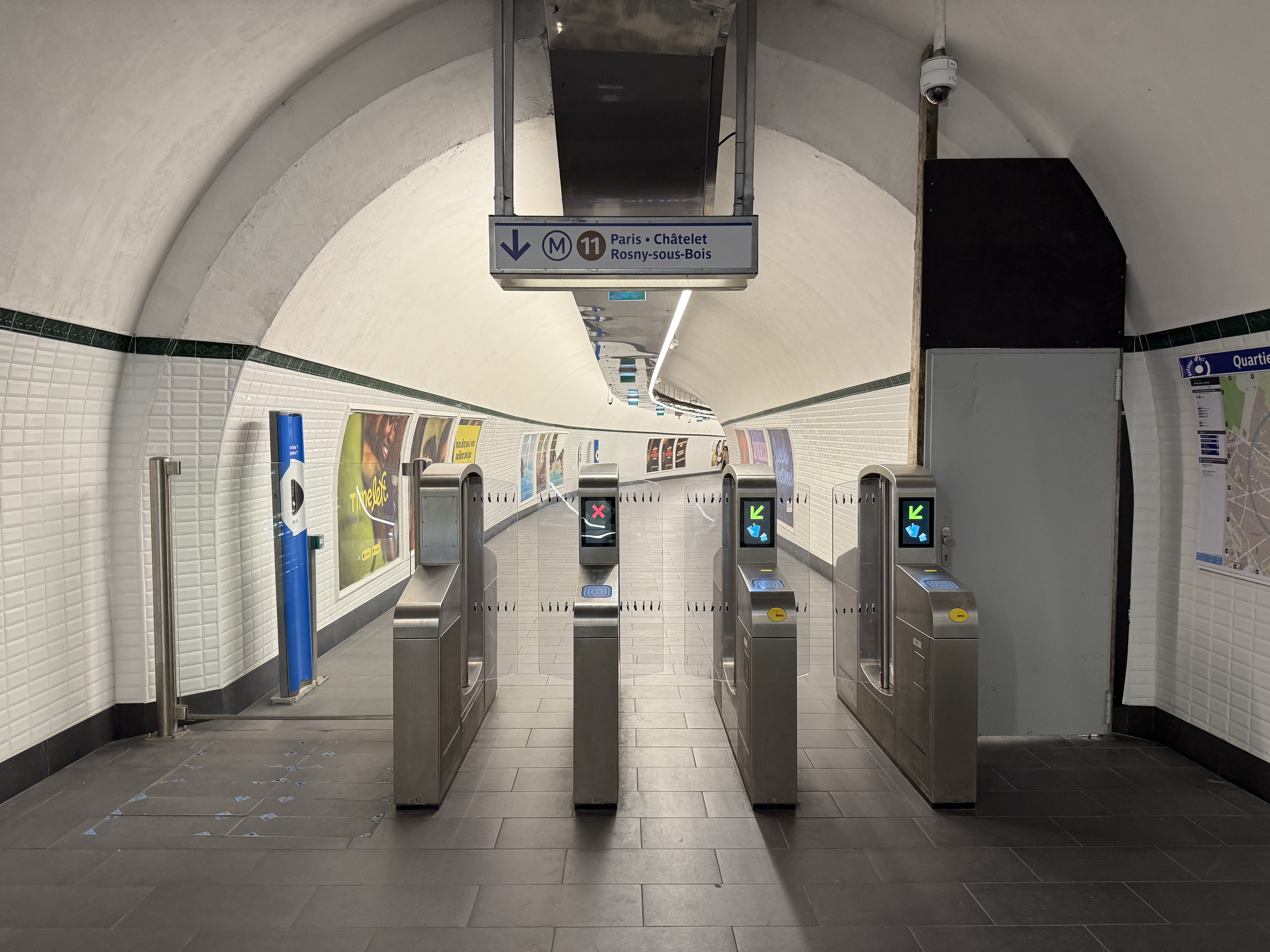
Fare gates for accesses 3/4

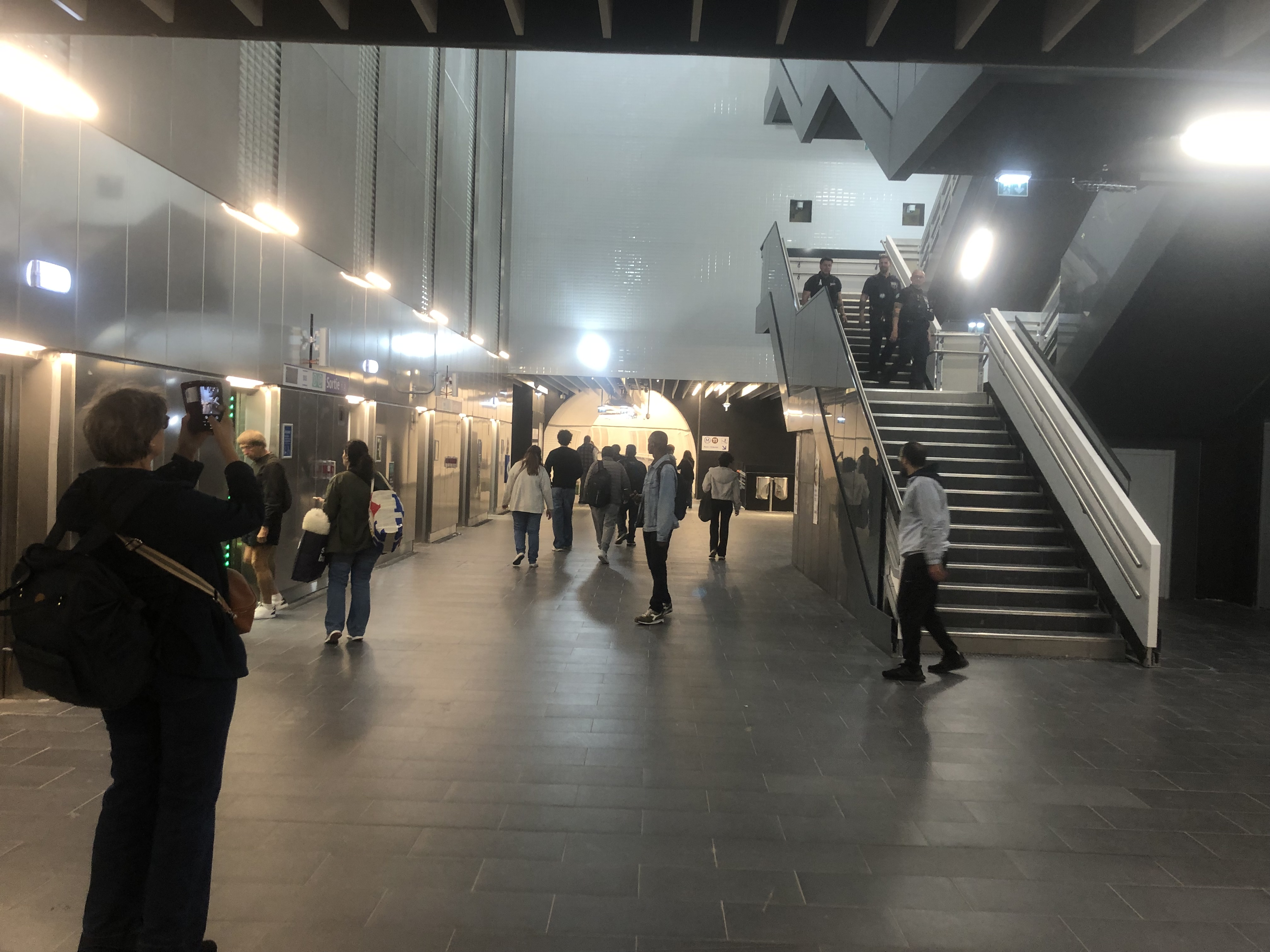
Main elevator/stair shaft

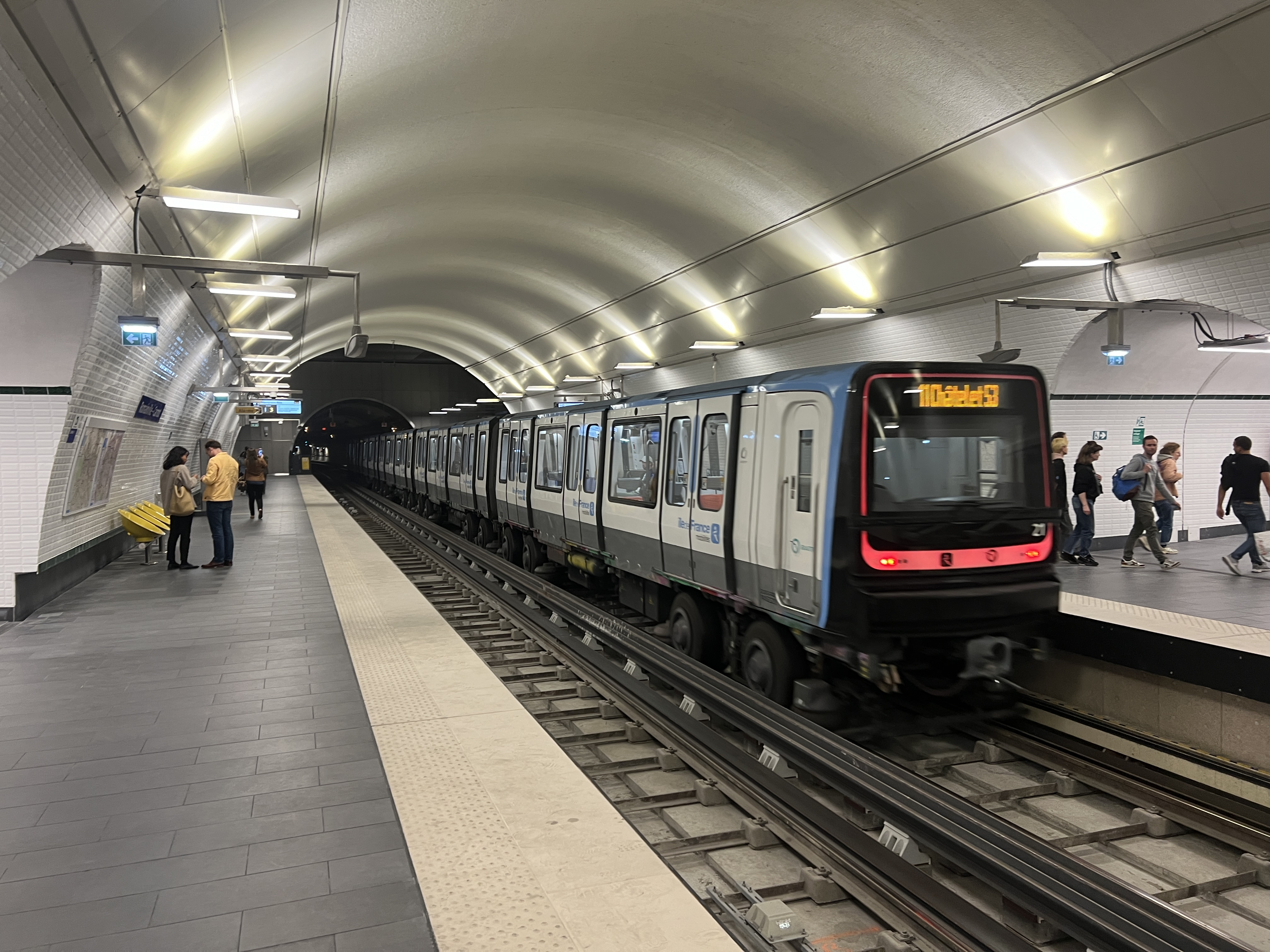
Platforms with a train on the westbound track

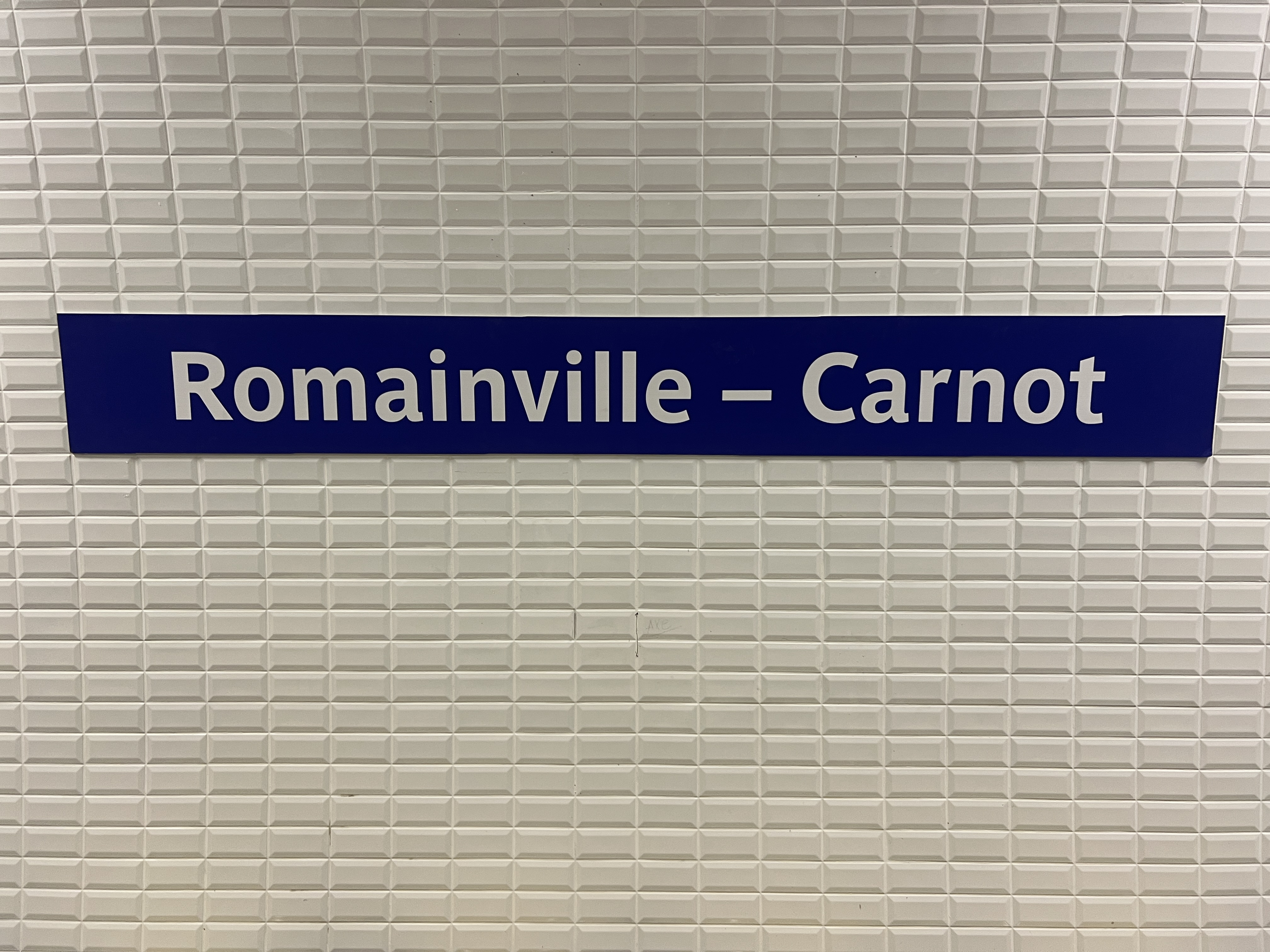
Station sign at platform level
