= Coteaux Beauclair station =

Paris Metro station in Rosny-sous-Bois and Noisy-le-Sec

Noisy-le-Sec–Rosny-sous-Bois Coteaux Beauclair
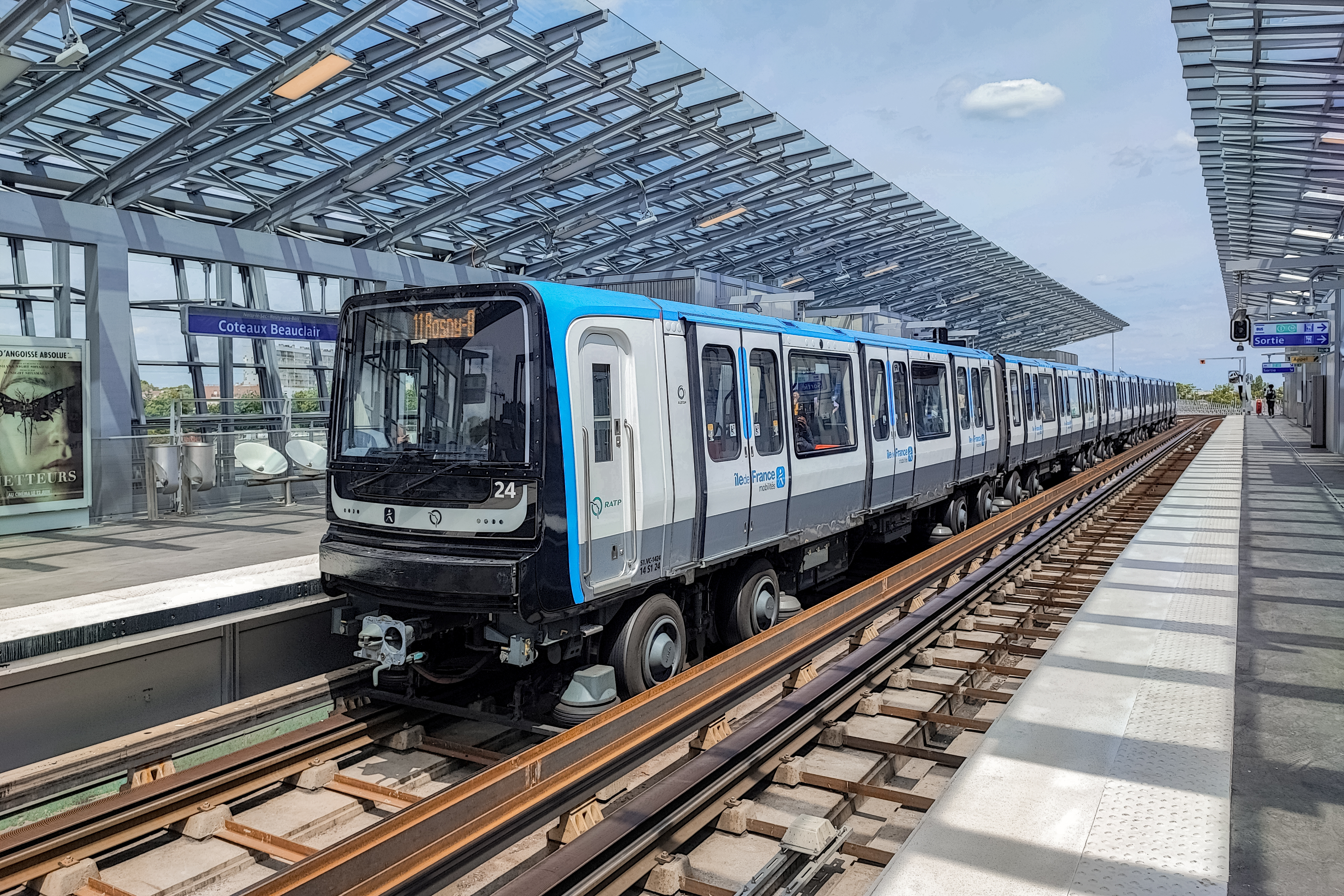
- MP 14 at Coteaux Beauclair on opening day

General information
- Location: Rosny-sous-Bois and Noisy-le-Sec, Seine-Saint-Denis; Île-de-France; France
- Coordinates: 48°52′56″N 2°28′03″E
- Owner: RATP
- Operator: RATP
- Line: Paris Metro Paris Metro Line 11
- Platforms: 2 side platforms
- Tracks: 2

Construction
- Structure type: Elevated
- Accessible: Yes
- Architect: Marc Mimram

Other information
- Fare zone: 3

History
- Opened: 13 June 2024

Services
Preceding station	Paris Metro	Following station
La Dhuys towards Châtelet	Line 11	Rosny–Bois-Perrier Terminus
Location
- Location within Paris and inner ring

Coteaux Beauclair station (French pronunciation: [koto boklɛʁ]) is a station on Line 11 of the Paris Metro. The station is situated in the communes of Rosny-sous-Bois and Noisy-le-Sec. It is the line's first and only station that is elevated and is located on a 580-metre-long (1,900 ft) viaduct.

== History ==
The station opened on 13 June 2024 as part of the extension of the line from Mairie des Lilas to Rosny–Bois-Perrier.

The station was initially given the provisional name of Londeau-Domus, after the nearby residential area of Londeau and the adjacent Domus shopping centre.

=== Construction ===
The station along with its associated viaduct were constructed by a consortium formed by Bouygues Construction, Soletanche Bachy, EFF (Entreprise française de fondations), and Victor Buyck Steel Construction. It is the first completely elevated station built on the network since 1905, built to compensate for the steep slope the station is located in. The station and viaducts were designed by Marc Mimram to evoke the spirit of earlier elevated stations built on the network with its metal colonnade and glass roof. This came after an architectural competition held by the Île-de- France Mobilités (IDFM) and RATP in 2013 together with local stakeholders.

Civil works started in July 2019. The installation of the glass roof was completed in July 2021. Civil works on the station platforms were completed by end 2021, with track laying beginning that summer and was completed in mid-December 2021. Three days of loading tests were also carried out in October 2022 with the new MP 14 rolling stock to ensure the structural viability of the viaduct. The project also involved the creation of a promenade beneath the viaducts, converging towards the station and a public square in front of it.

== Passenger services ==
=== Access ===
The station has a single access at the southern end of the platforms, near ruelle de la Boissière.

=== Station layout ===
Platform level	Side platform, doors will open on the right
Platform level	Westbound	← toward Châtelet (La Dhuys)
Platform level	Eastbound	toward Rosny–Bois-Perrier (Terminus) →
Platform level	Side platform, doors will open on the right
1F	Mezzanine
Street Level

=== Platforms ===
The station is elevated at a height of 8 m and has a standard configuration with 2 tracks flanked by 2 side platforms.

=== Other connections ===
The station is also served by line 245 of the RATP bus network, and by line 1 of the Titus bus network.

== Nearby ==
- Domus (shopping centre)
- Parc des Guillaumes
- ZAC Coteaux-Beauclair

== Gallery ==
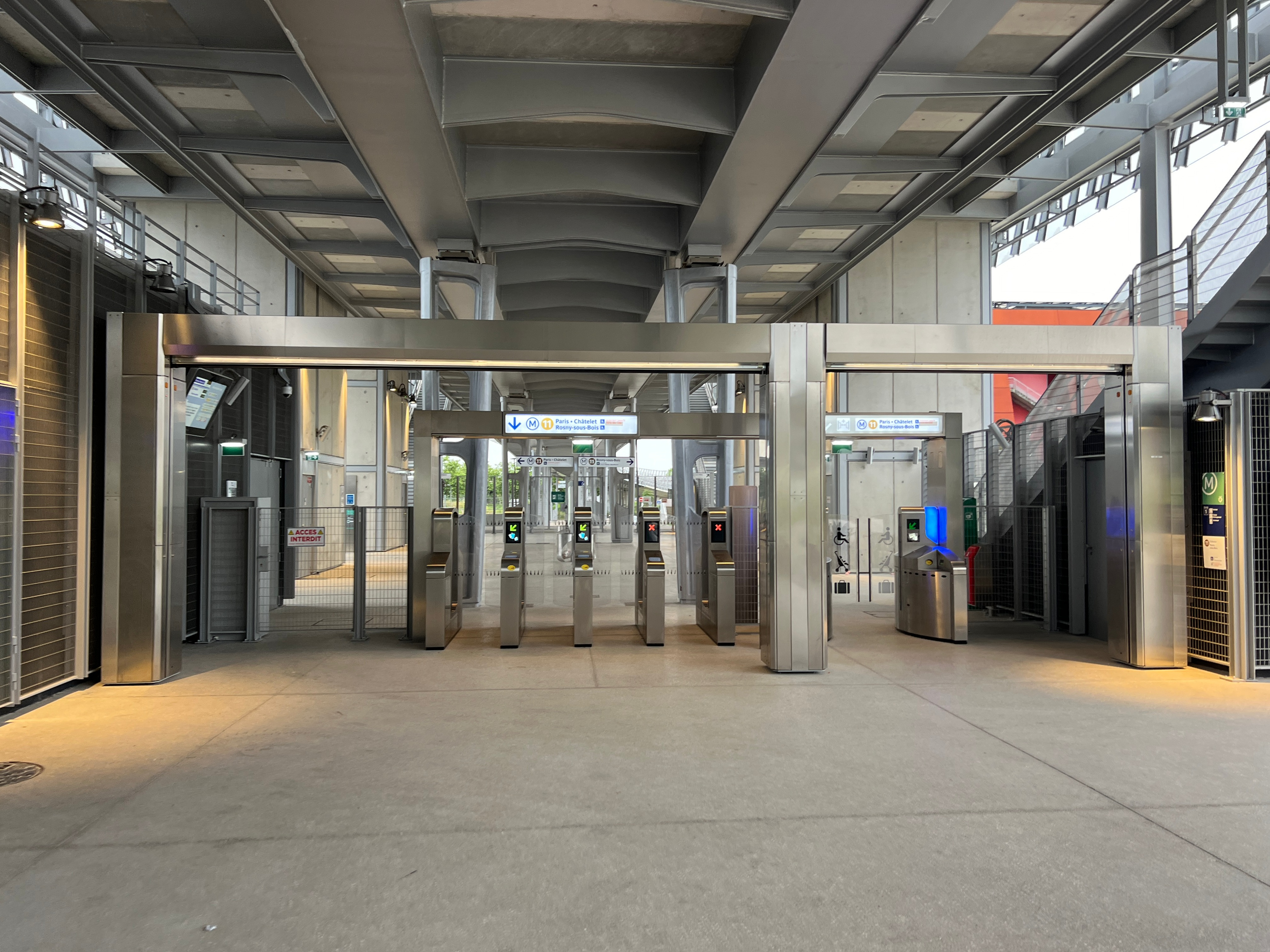
Access

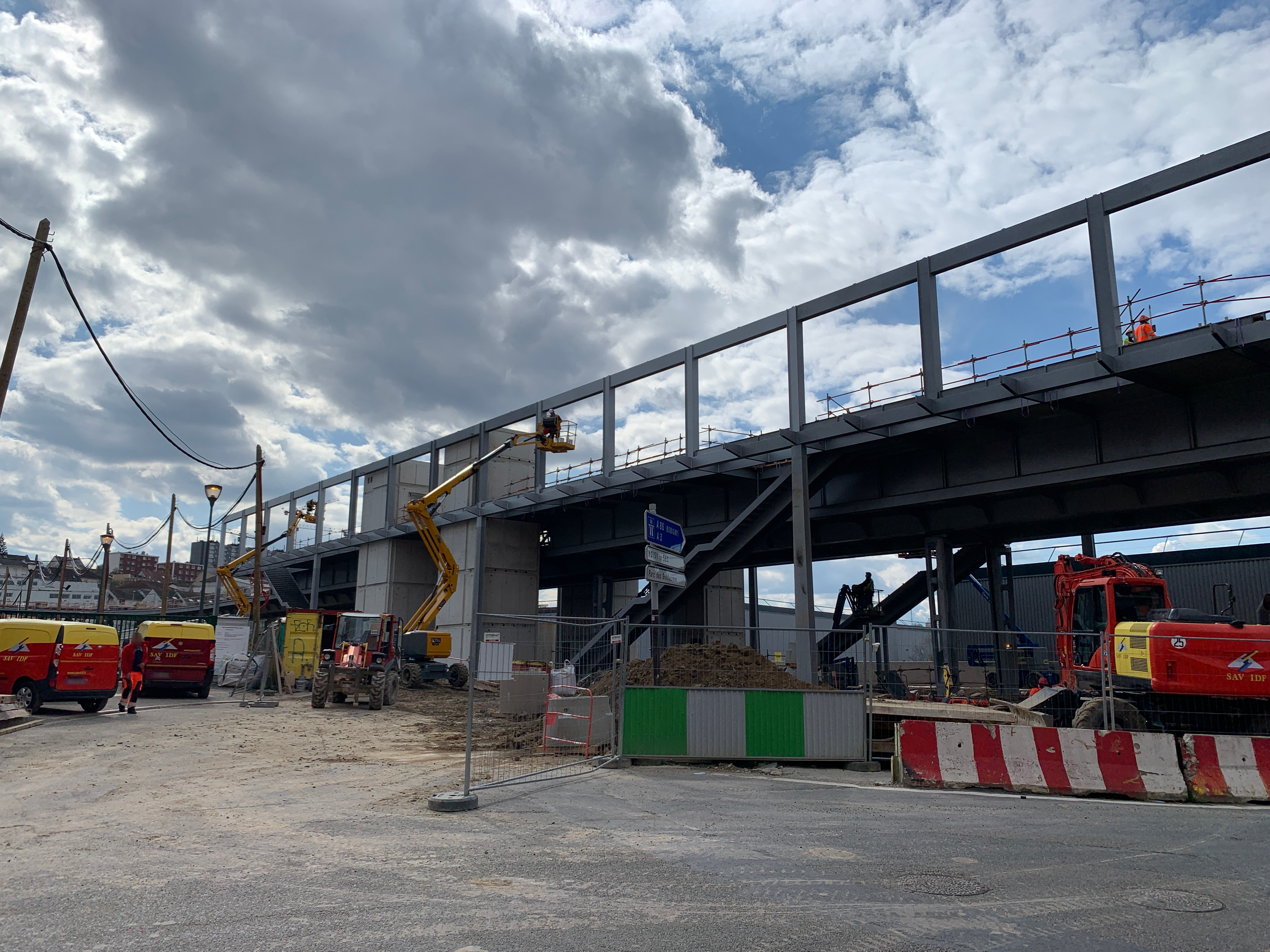
Construction in 2021

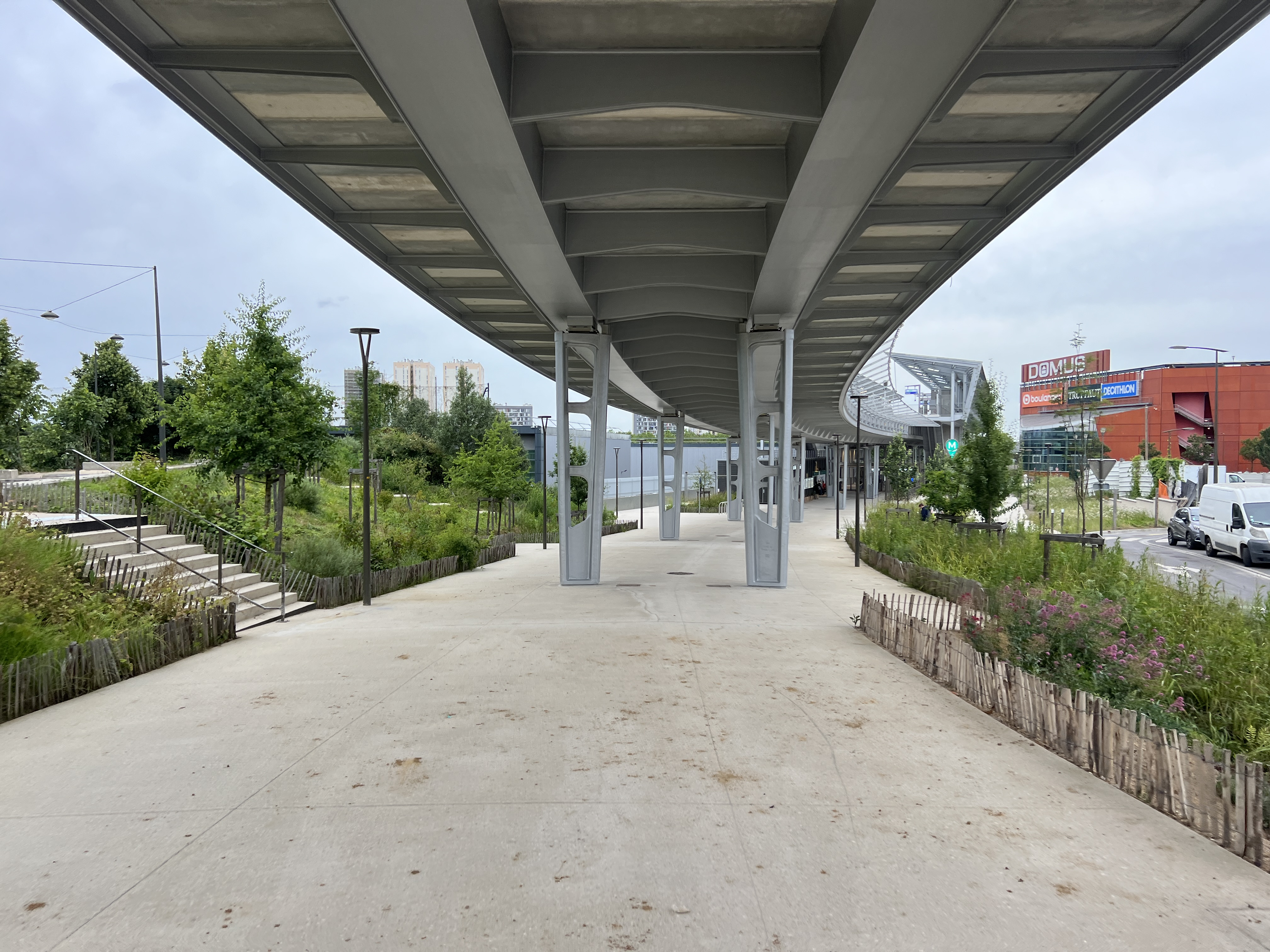
Promenade underneath the viaducts

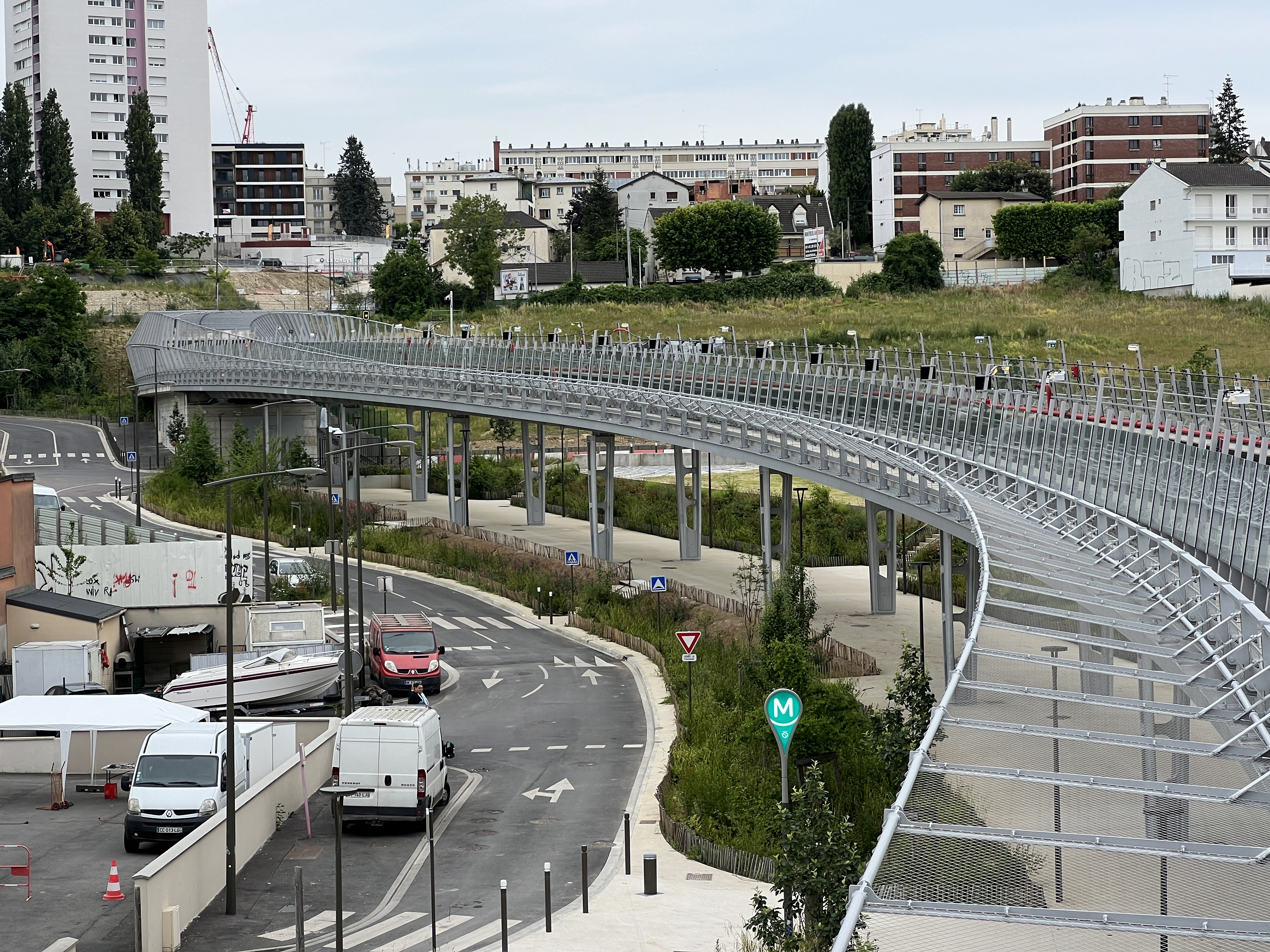
Viaduct
