= Aristide Briand station =

Proposed metro station in Paris, France

Aristide Briand

General information
- Location: Montreuil, Seine-Saint-Denis; Île-de-France; France
- Coordinates: 48°52′11″N 2°26′59″E
- Owner: RATP
- Operator: RATP

Construction
- Accessible: Yes

History
- Opening: 2030

Services
Preceding station	Paris Metro	Following station
Mairie de Montreuil towards Pont de Sèvres	Line 9	Montreuil–Hôpital Terminus
Location
- Location within Paris and inner ring

Aristide Briand (French pronunciation: [aʁistid bʁijɑ̃]) is a proposed station on Line 9 of the Paris Métro in Montreuil. The station will be located just northeast of the line's current terminus at Mairie de Montreuil, below Boulevard Aristide Briand at the Carrefour du 8 Mai 1945. It is slated to open after 2030, as work has yet to be started for its construction.
