= Serge Gainsbourg station =

Metro station in Les Lilas, France

Les Lilas Serge Gainsbourg
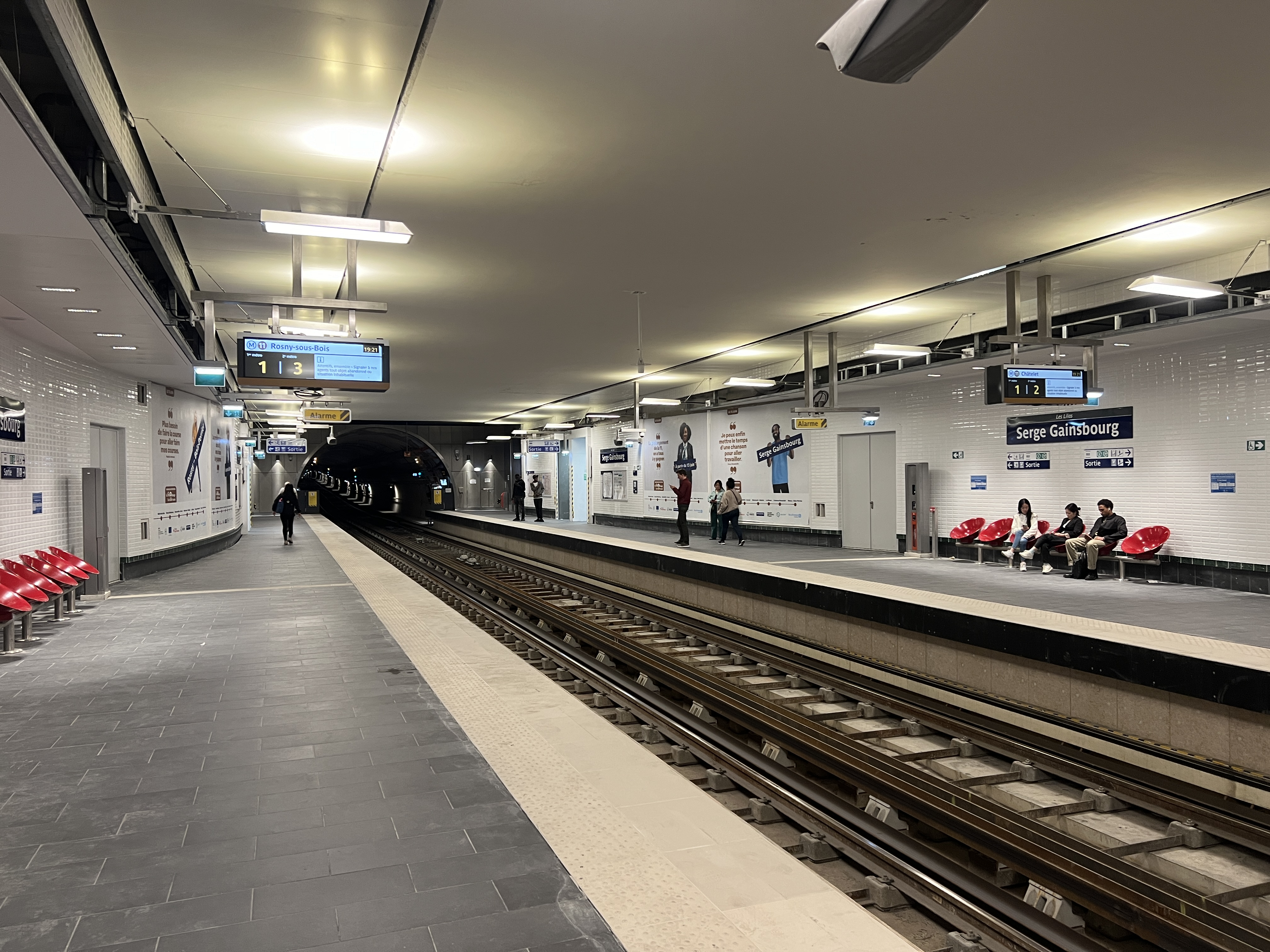
- Platforms on opening day

General information
- Location: Les Lilas, Seine-Saint-Denis; Île-de-France; France
- Coordinates: 48°52′53″N 2°25′38″E
- Owner: RATP
- Operator: RATP
- Line: Paris Metro Paris Metro Line 11
- Platforms: 2 side platforms
- Tracks: 2

Construction
- Accessible: Yes
- Architect: Richez Associés

History
- Opened: 13 June 2024

Services
Preceding station	Paris Metro	Following station
Mairie des Lilas towards Châtelet	Line 11	Romainville–Carnot towards Rosny–Bois-Perrier
Location
- Location within Paris and inner ring

Serge Gainsbourg (French pronunciation: [sɛʁʒ(ə) ɡɛ̃zbuʁ]) is a station on Line 11 of the Paris Metro. It is located at Square Henri-Dunant in the suburb of Les Lilas. It opened on 13 June 2024 as part of the line's eastward extension to Rosny–Bois-Perrier.

== History ==
=== Name ===
The station was initially given the provisional name of Liberté. It was then renamed Serge Gainsbourg, after the French artist who had composed the song "Le Poinçonneur des Lilas" ("The ticket-puncher of Les Lilas") in 1958. There have been objections to naming it after Gainsbourg, citing "misogyny".

=== Construction ===
On 16 July 2021, the tunnel boring machine, Sofia, arrived at the station after more than 15 months of digging since January 2020, marking the end of excavation works for the extension of Line 11. The construction of the main entrance was completed by the end of January 2022 while the other entrance was completed in July 2022. Track laying also began in February 2022. The station was designed by architects Richez Associés, who also designed three other stations on the extension.

== Passenger services ==
=== Access ===
The station has two entrances equipped with escalators, with the main entrance (with a lift) located at Square Henri-Dunant and the other entrance located at the intersection of the Rue de la Liberté and Boulevard du Général-Leclerc-de-Hautecloque.

=== Station layout ===
Street Level
B1	Mezzanine
Line 11 platforms	Side platform, doors will open on the right
Line 11 platforms	Westbound	← toward Châtelet (Mairie des Lilas)
Line 11 platforms	Eastbound	toward Rosny–Bois-Perrier (Romainville–Carnot) →
Line 11 platforms	Side platform, doors will open on the right

=== Platforms ===
The station will have a standard configuration with 2 tracks surrounded by 2 side platforms.

=== Other connections ===
The station is also served by lines 105 and 515 (TillBus) of the RATP bus network, and at night, by line N12 of the Noctilien bus network.

== Gallery ==
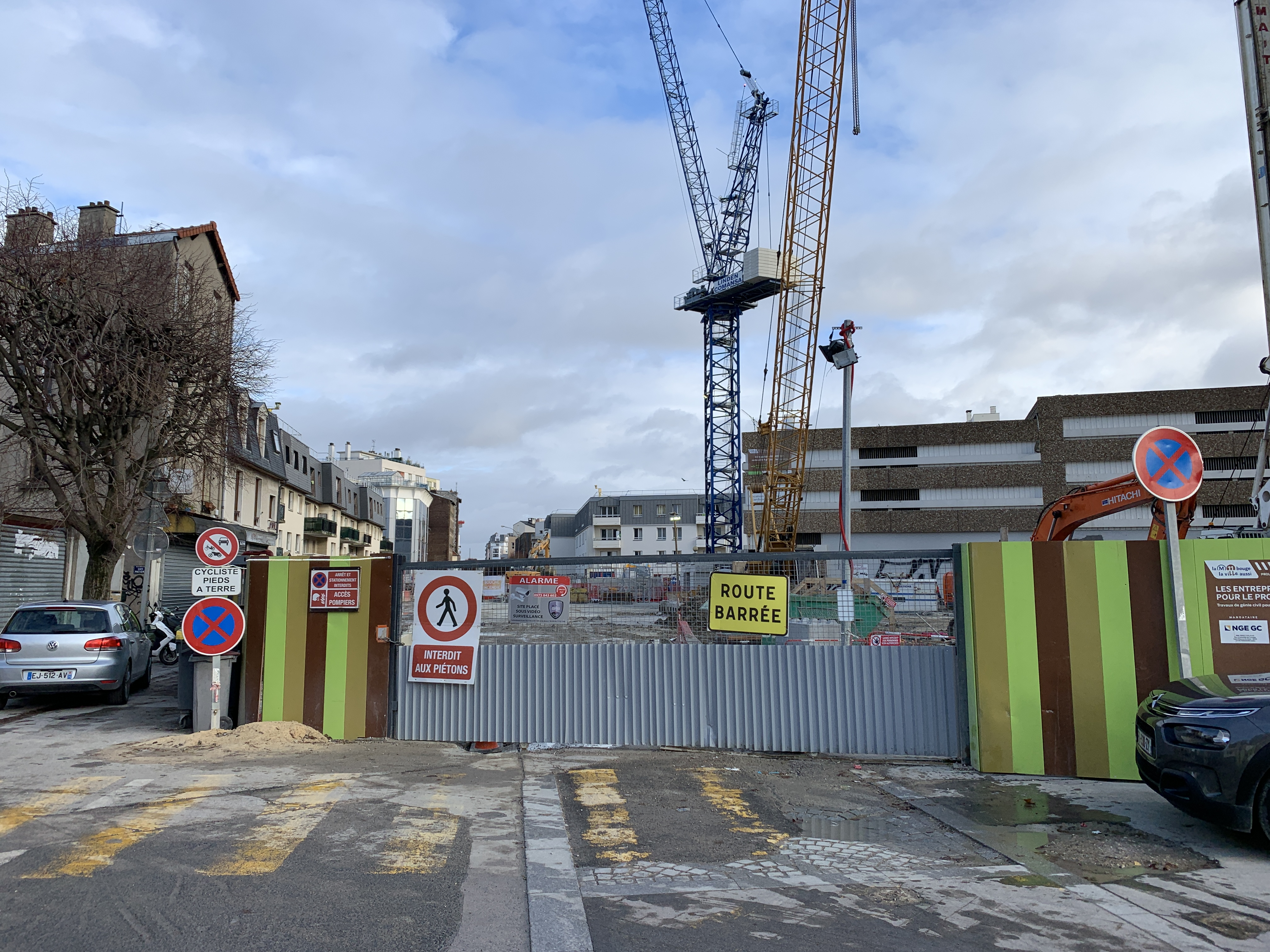
Construction of the station (2019)
