= Télégraphe station =

Metro station in Paris, France

Télégraphe
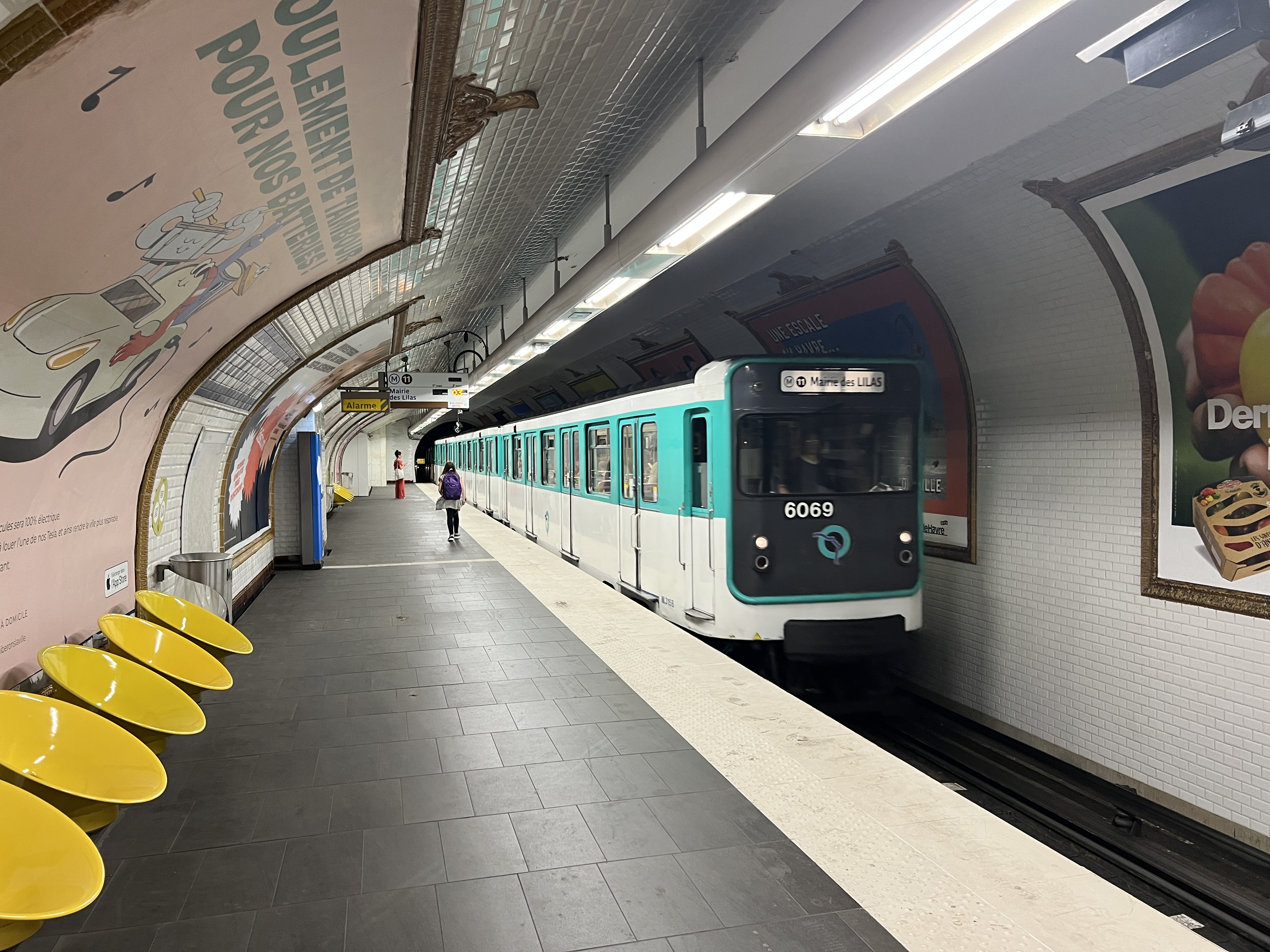
- Line 11 platforms towards Mairie des Lilas

General information
- Location: 19th arrondissement of Paris; Île-de-France; France
- Coordinates: 48°52′32″N 2°23′54″E
- System: Paris Metro station
- Owner: RATP
- Operator: RATP
- Line: Paris Metro Paris Metro Line 11
- Platforms: 2 side platforms
- Tracks: 2

Other information
- Station code: 23-15
- Fare zone: 1

History
- Opened: 28 April 1935

Passengers
- 1,194,040 (2020)

Services
Preceding station	Paris Metro	Following station
Place des Fêtes towards Châtelet	Line 11	Porte des Lilas towards Rosny–Bois-Perrier
Location
- Location within Paris

Télégraphe (French pronunciation: [teleɡʁaf]) is a station on Line 11 of the Paris Metro in the 19th and 20th arrondissements. It is named after the nearby rue de Télégraphe, which was once a chemin de ronde (a raised protected walkway behind a battlement) of the park of the Château de Ménilmontant. Its name comes from the optical telegraph invented by Claude Chappe (1763–1805) in 1792. This was the first practical telecommunications system, but was eventually replaced by the electric telegraph. Chappe installed the relay station, containing the telegraph's apparatus which he called a tachygraphe, on this peak of 128 meters altitude.

== History ==
The station opened as part of the original section of the line from Châtelet to Porte des Lilas on 28 April 1935.

On 1 April 2016, half of the nameplates on the station's platforms were temporarily replaced by the RATP as part of April Fool's Day, along with 12 other stations. It was humorously renamed "#TWEET", a reference to the evolution of text messaging in the 21st century and as a tribute to Twitter.

As part of modernization works for the extension of the Line to Rosny–Bois-Perrier in 2023 for the Grand Paris Express, the station was closed from 8 June 2019 to 15 July 2019 to raise its platform levels and its surface tiled to accommodate the new rolling stock that will be used (MP 14) to accommodate the expected increase passengers and to improve the station's accessibility. An additional entrance will also added at the corner of rue de Belleville and rue du Docteur Potain and will be equipped with a lift.

In 2019, the station was used by 1,823,734 passengers, making it the 257th busiest of the Metro network out of 302 stations.

In 2020, the station was used by 1,194,040 passengers amidst the COVID-19 pandemic, making it the 220th busiest of the Metro network out of 305 stations.

== Passenger services ==
=== Access ===
The station has 3 entrances:

- Entrance 1: rue du Télégraphe
- Entrance 2: rue de Belleville
- Entrance 3: Cimetière de Belleville

=== Station layout ===
G	Street Level	Exit/Entrance
B1	Mezzanine
B2	Side platform, doors will open on the right
B2	Southbound	← toward Châtelet (Place des Fêtes)
B2	Wall
B2	Northbound	toward Rosny–Bois-Perrier (Porte des Lilas) →
B2	Side platform, doors will open on the right

=== Platforms ===
The station has a standard configuration with 2 tracks surrounded by 2 side platforms. The station's tracks are separated by a supporting wall to strengthen the station box as it is built in soft ground. Due to the significant depth of the platforms, certain landings between flights of stairs that led to the mezzanine level were equipped with seats for travellers to rest. This was removed during the station's renovation and modernisation as part of the Un métro + beau programme by the RATP on 28 June 2016. This feature still exists at Buttes Chaumont.

=== Other connections ===
The station is also served by lines 20 and 60 of the RATP bus network, and at night, by lines N12 and N23 of the Noctilien bus network.

== Gallery ==
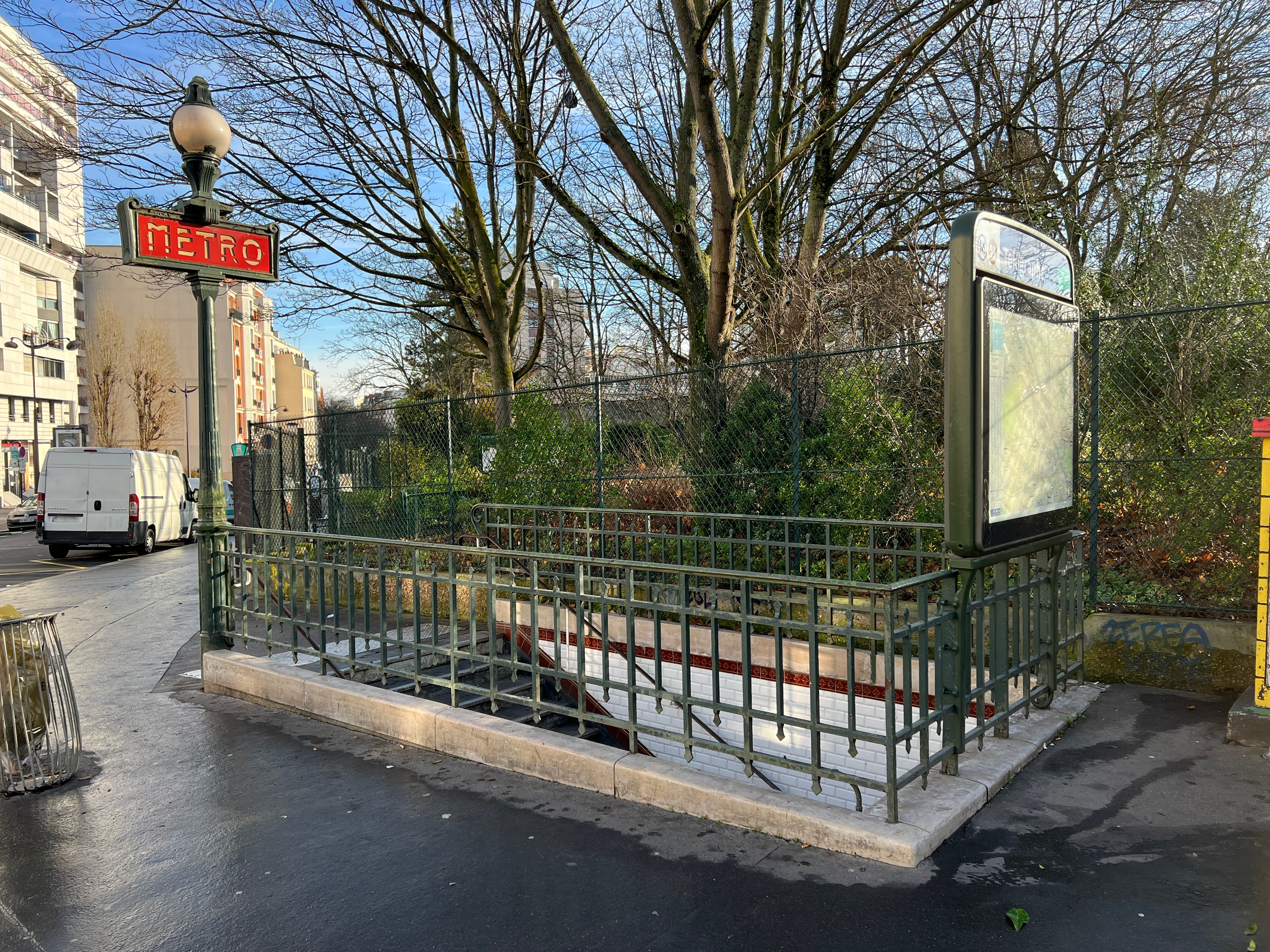
Entrance 1

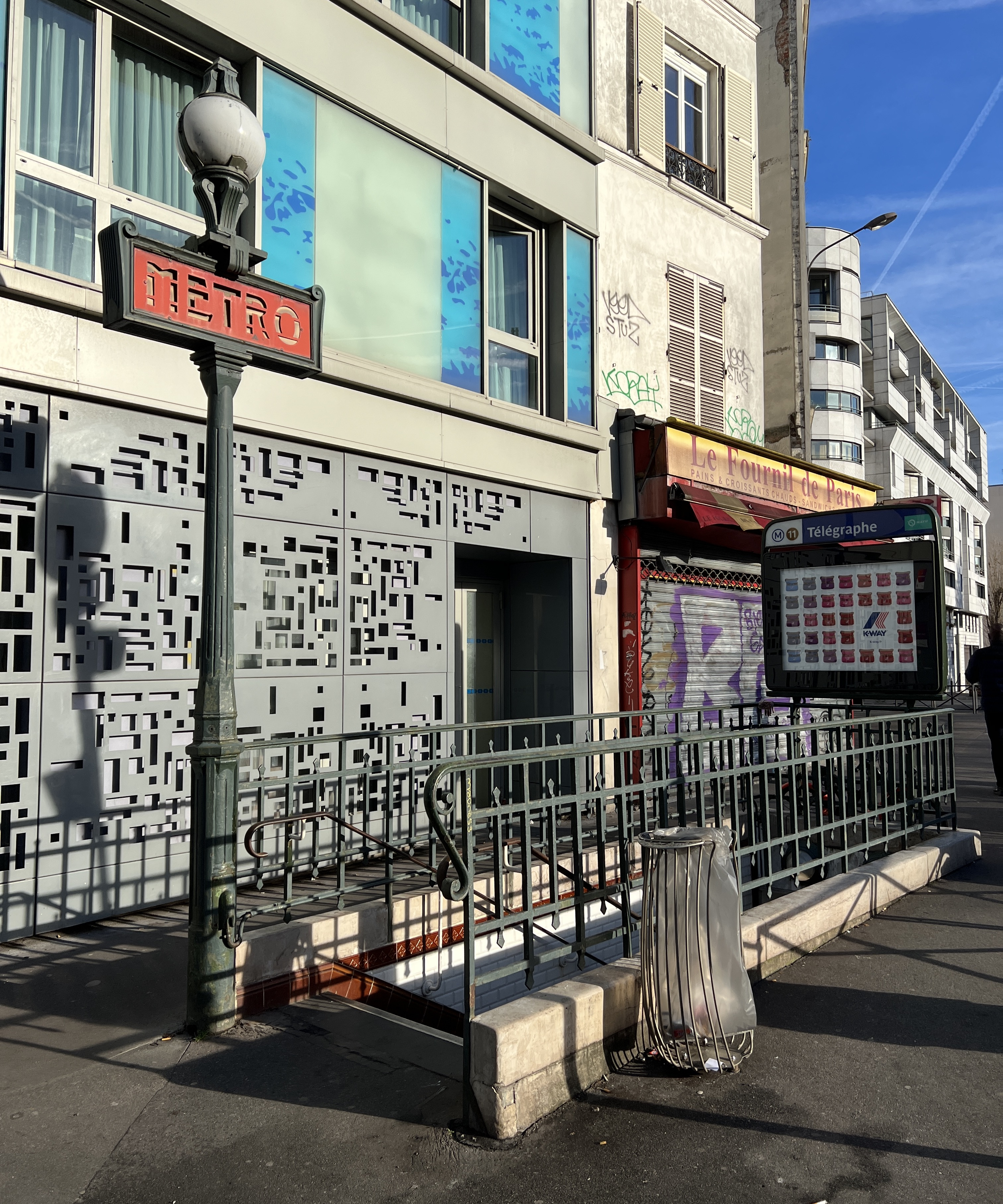
Entrance 2

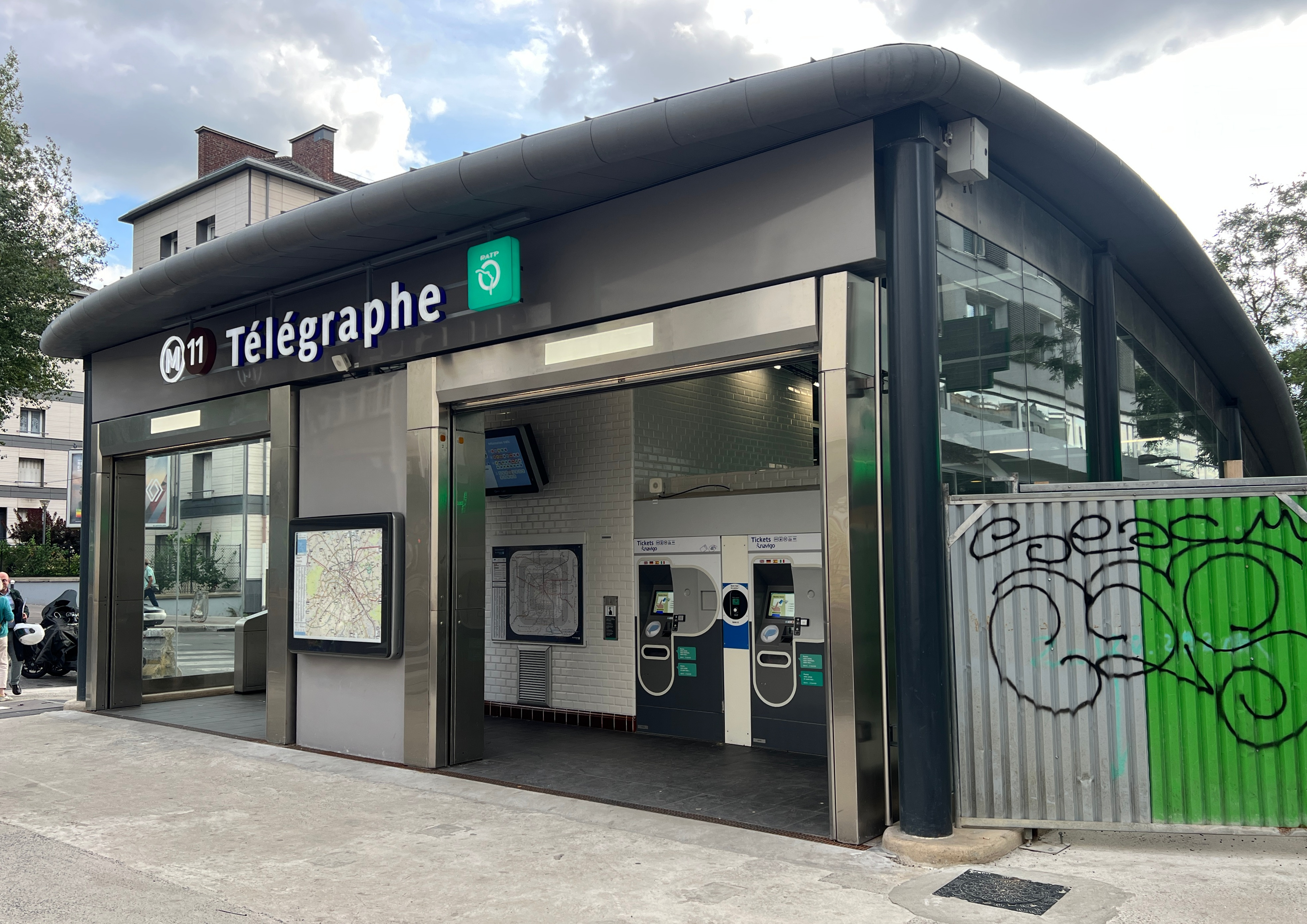
Entrance opened in 2023
