= Place des Fêtes station =

Metro station in Paris, France

Place des Fêtes
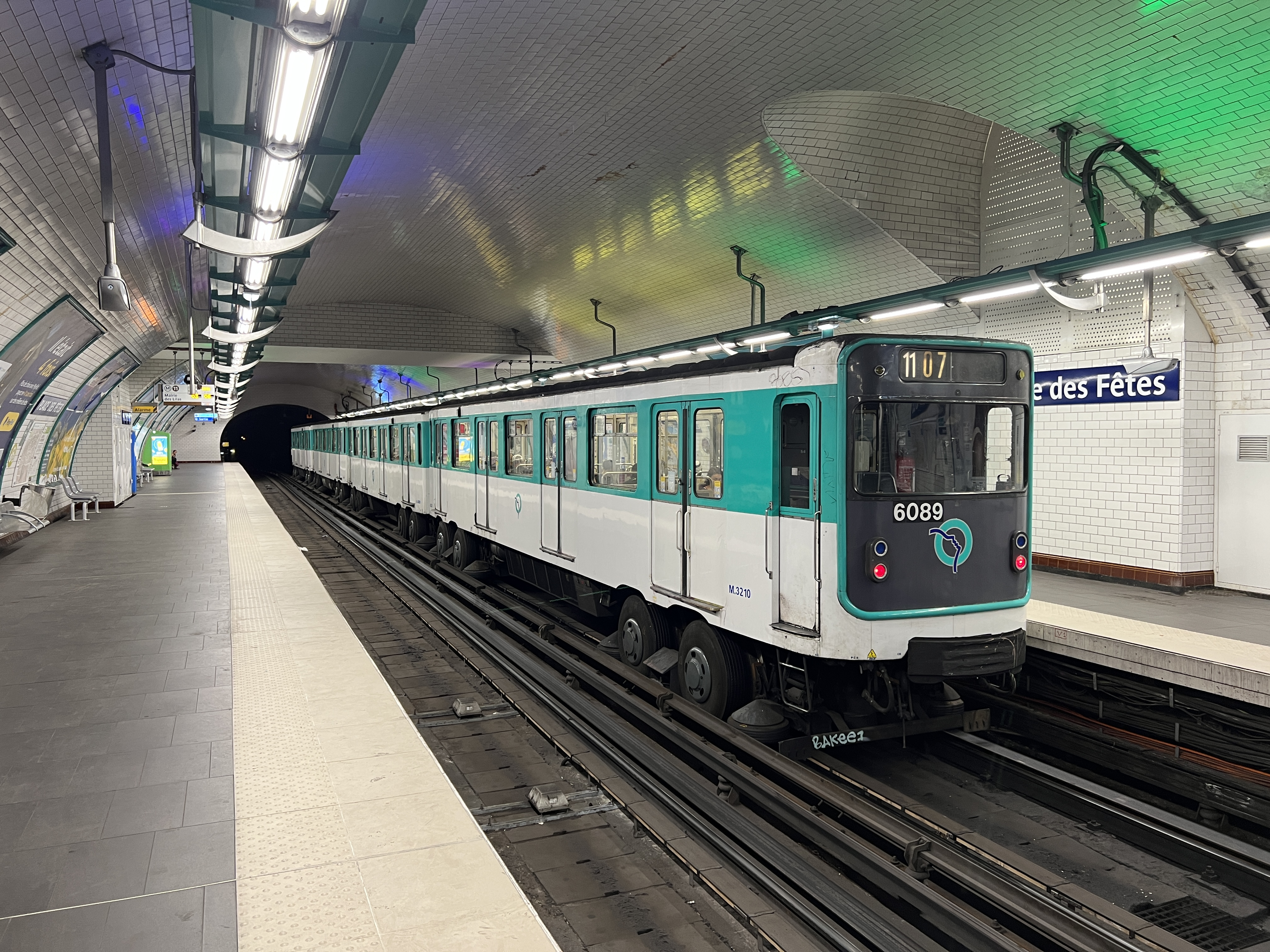
- MP 59 on line 11 at Place des Fêtes

General information
- Location: 19th arrondissement of Paris; Île-de-France; France
- Coordinates: 48°52′37″N 2°23′35″E
- System: Paris Metro station
- Owner: RATP
- Operator: RATP
- Line: Paris Metro Paris Metro Line 7bis Paris Metro Line 11
- Platforms: 3 (1 island platform, 2 side platforms)
- Tracks: 4

Construction
- Depth: 22.45 m (73.7 ft)
- Accessible: no

Other information
- Station code: 23-08
- Fare zone: 1

History
- Opened: 18 January 1911 (Line 7); 28 April 1935 (Line 11); 3 December 1967 (Line 7bis)

Passengers
- 2,318,764 (2021)

Services
| Preceding station | Paris Metro | Following station |
|---|---|---|
| Botzaris One-way operation | Line 7bis Loop eastbound only | Pré-Saint-Gervais Terminus |
| Jourdain towards Châtelet | Line 11 | Télégraphe towards Rosny–Bois-Perrier |
Location
- Location within Paris

Place des Fêtes (French pronunciation: [plas de fɛt]) is a station of the Paris Metro, serving lines 7bis (towards Pré-Saint-Gervais only) and 11 in the 19th arrondissement and the Belleville district. It is one of the deepest stations in the metro, at 22.45 m underground (Abbesses is the deepest at 36 m).

== History ==
The station opened on 18 January 1911 as part of a branch of line 7 from Louis Blanc to Pré Saint-Gervais. The line 11 platforms opened with the first section of the line from Châtelet to Porte des Lilas on 28 April 1935. Along with Maison Blanche, a prototype air raid shelter was added to the station in 1935 to protect it from chemical attacks and was fitted with airtight doors to allow the people to take refuge in the event of an attack. They were chosen because of their proximity to heavily populated working-class districts. On 3 December 1967, the branch was separated from line 7 and became line 7bis.

In preparation for Line 11's extension to Rosny–Bois-Perrier, its platforms were raised slightly and tiled in from 4 August to 7 September 2018. In March 2019, a new emergency exit was completed, located in a small building in Square Monseigneur Maillet, near access 1. It was designed to blend in with its natural surroundings with a wooden design and a green roof. The former access to the station was closed to the public.

In 2019, the station was used by 2 921 564 passengers, making it the 181st-busiest of the Metro network out of 302 stations.

In 2020, the station was used by 2,107,812 passengers amidst the COVID-19 pandemic, making it the 115th-busiest of the Metro network out of 305 stations.

In 2021, the station was used by 3,258,568 passengers, making it the 94th-busiest of the Metro network out of 304 stations.

== Passenger services ==
=== Access ===
The station's original access building with a canopy built in an Art Nouveau style was demolished in 1935 to make way for its current Art Deco building. It now has two accesses:

- Access 1: Place des Fêtes
- Access 2: rue de Crimée

=== Station layout ===
Street level
| B1 | Mezzanine |
| Line 7bis platforms | Outbound | Not in regular use |
| Line 7bis platforms | Island platform, doors will open on the left, right |
| Line 7bis platforms | Outbound | toward Louis Blanc (Pré-Saint-Gervais) → (No service from inbound: Botzaris) (No service eastbound: Haxo) |
| Line 11 platforms | Side platform, doors will open on the right |
| Line 11 platforms | Southbound | ← toward Châtelet (Jourdain) |
| Line 11 platforms | Northbound | toward Rosny–Bois-Perrier (Télégraphe) → |
| Line 11 platforms | Side platform, doors will open on the right |

=== Platforms ===
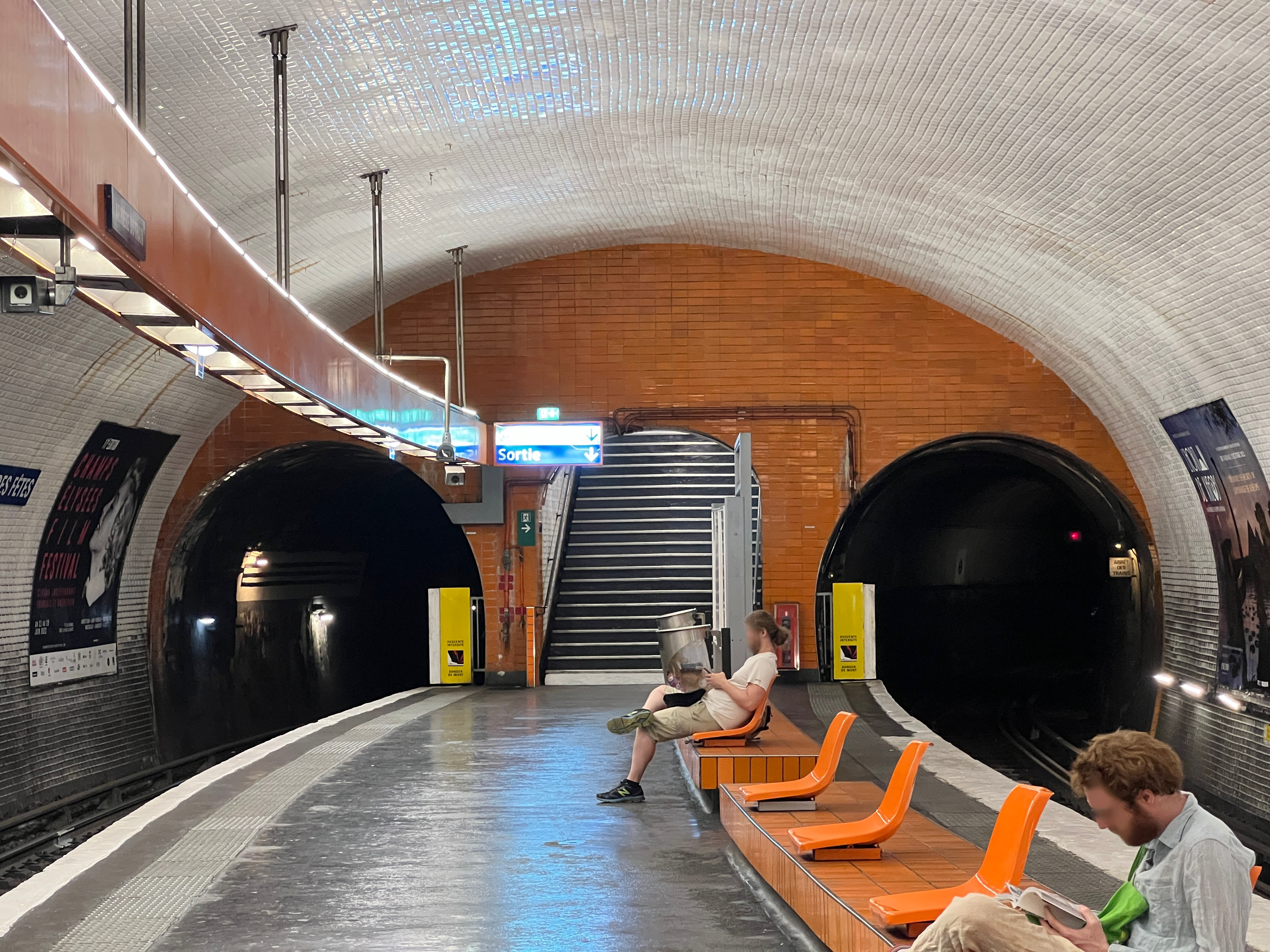
Only the track on the left is used for regular service

Line 7bis's island platform is located in a curve and is flanked by two tracks. The southern track, on the outer side of the curve, is used for regular service for services towards Pré Saint-Gervais. The northern track, on the inner side of the curve, is not used for regular service. It leads to a connection with line 3bis towards Porte des Lilas - Cinéma via Voie des Fêtes and Haxo (a ghost station). It is decorated in the Andreu-Motte style utilising orange tiles.

Line 11's platforms have a standard configuration with 2 tracks surrounded by 2 side platforms.

=== Other connections ===
The station is also served by lines 20, 48, and 60 of the RATP bus network.

== Nearby ==
- Regard de la Lanterne
- Square Monseigneur Maillet

== Gallery ==
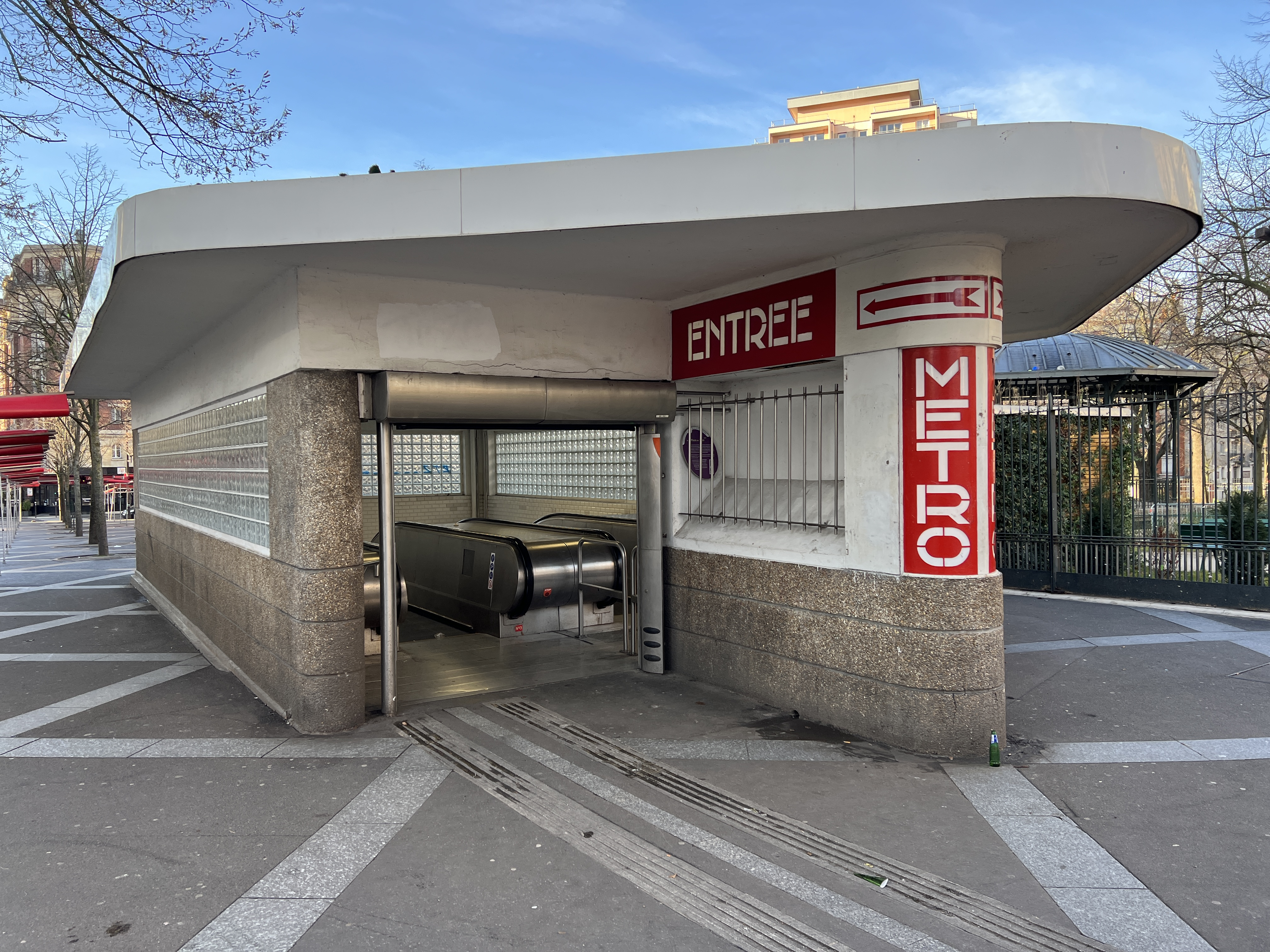
Access 1

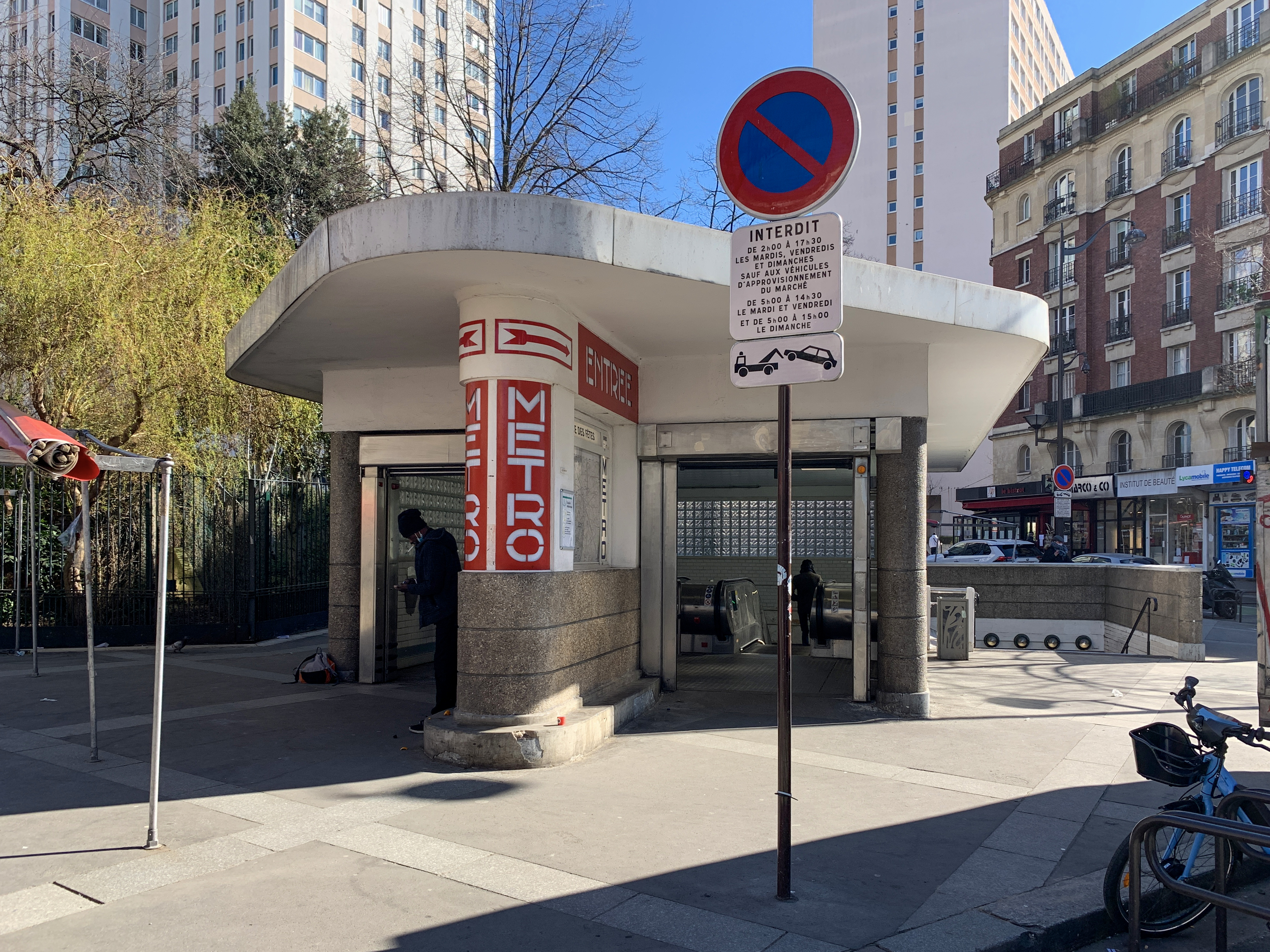
Access 2

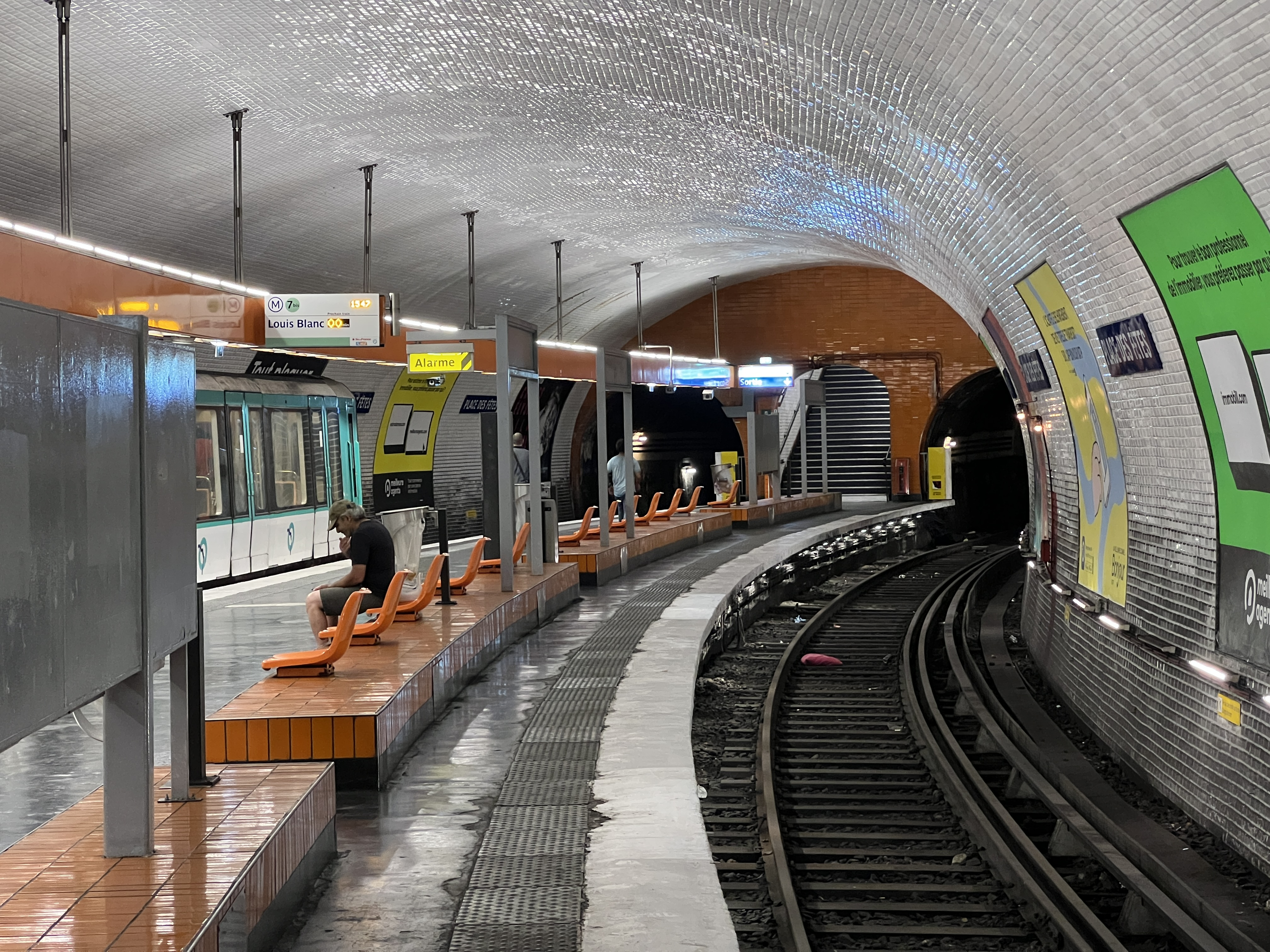
MF 88 on line 7bis at Place des Fêtes.
