= Paris Metro Line 11 =

Subway route in the French capital

Line 11
- Paris Metro Line 11
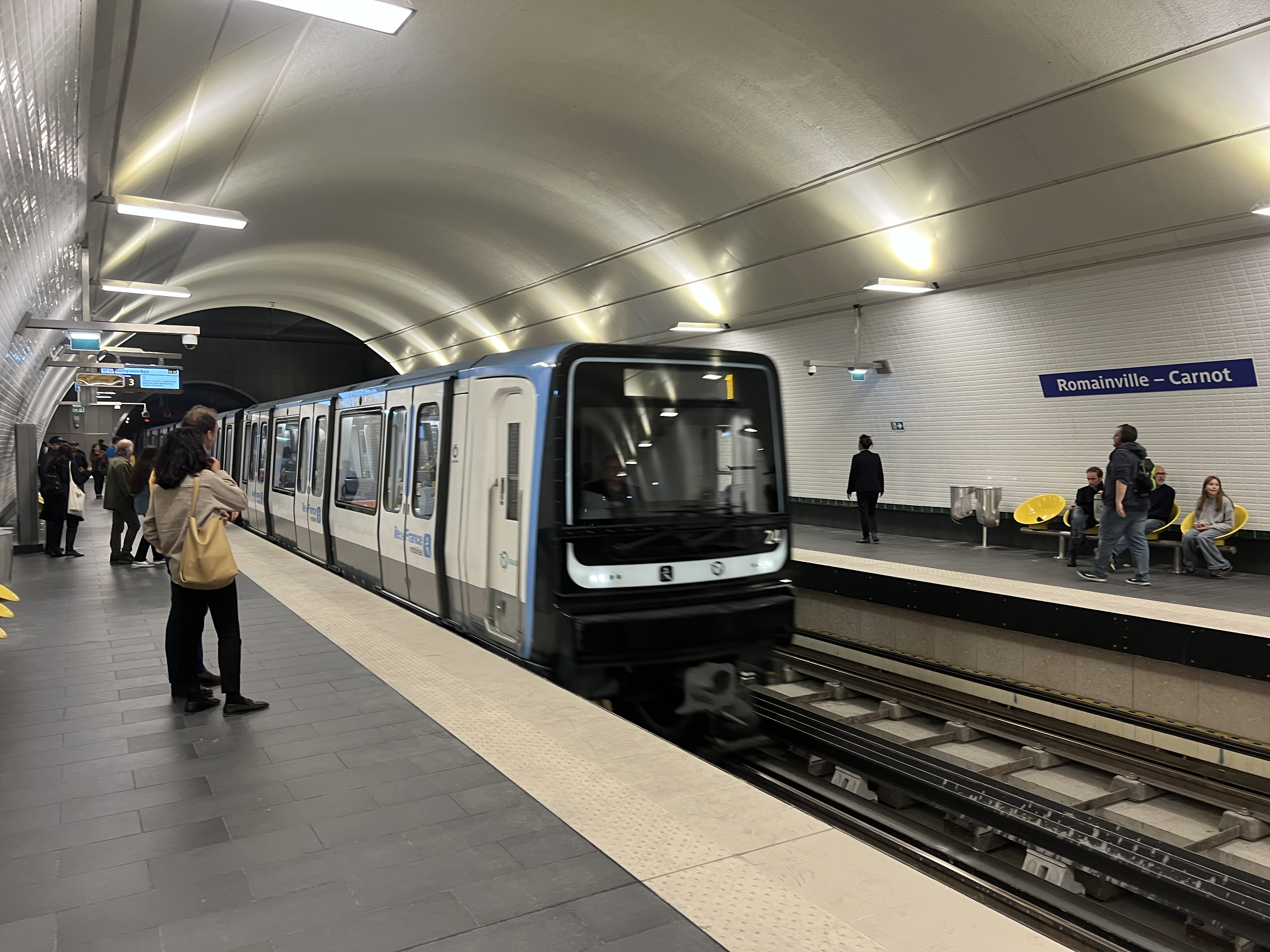
- MP 14 at Romainville–Carnot

Overview
- Locale: Paris, Les Lilas, Romainville, Montreuil, Noisy-le-Sec, and Rosny-sous-Bois
- Termini: Châtelet; Rosny–Bois-Perrier
- Connecting lines: Paris Metro Paris Metro Line 1 Paris Metro Line 2 Paris Metro Line 3 Paris Metro Line 3bis Paris Metro Line 4 Paris Metro Line 5 Paris Metro Line 7 Paris Metro Line 7bis Paris Metro Line 8 Paris Metro Line 9 Paris Metro Line 14 RER RER A RER B RER D RER E Tramways in Île-de-France Île-de-France tramway Line 3b
- Stations: 19

Service
- System: Paris Metro
- Operator: RATP
- Rolling stock: MP 14 CC (39 trains as of 7 October 2025)
- Ridership: 52 million (avg. per year); 13th/16 (2025)

History
- Opened: 28 April 1935; 91 years ago

Technical
- Line length: 11.7 km (7.3 mi)
- Track gauge: 1,435 mm (4 ft 8 1/2 in) standard gauge between roll ways
- Electrification: 750 V DC guide bars on either side of the track
- Conduction system: Conductor
- Average inter-station distance: 650 m (2,130 ft)
Route map
- (*) Under Construction (**) Planned

Paris Metro Line 11 (French: Ligne 11 du métro de Paris) is one of the sixteen currently open lines of the Paris Metro. It links Châtelet to Rosny–Bois-Perrier in Rosny-sous-Bois, in the neighboring department of Seine-Saint-Denis. Opened in 1935, line 11 was one of the last historical lines to be put into service, even after the first parts of lines 12 and 13. It was then intended to replace the Belleville funicular tramway, which closed in 1924. The line is 11.7 km (7.3 mi) in length with 19 stations.

Before its 2024 extension east from Mairie des Lilas, it was one of the least used lines, with less than forty million passengers in 2023, and also ran the oldest trains still in service, the MP 59. The RATP expects thirty-one million more in 2025 after the eastbound expansion.

During the 1950s and 1960s, the line was used as experimental grounds for innovations developed by the RATP. It was the first metro line in the world to be equipped with rubber tyres, back in 1956. It was also equipped with a centralised control station, and first welcomed automatic train operation on the Paris Metro, back in 1967. It was extended from Mairie des Lilas to Rosny–Bois-Perrier on 13 June 2024, almost doubling its length and adding six stations. A proposed extension to Noisy–Champs, despite being part of the original Grand Paris Express project, has been postponed indefinitely.

== History ==
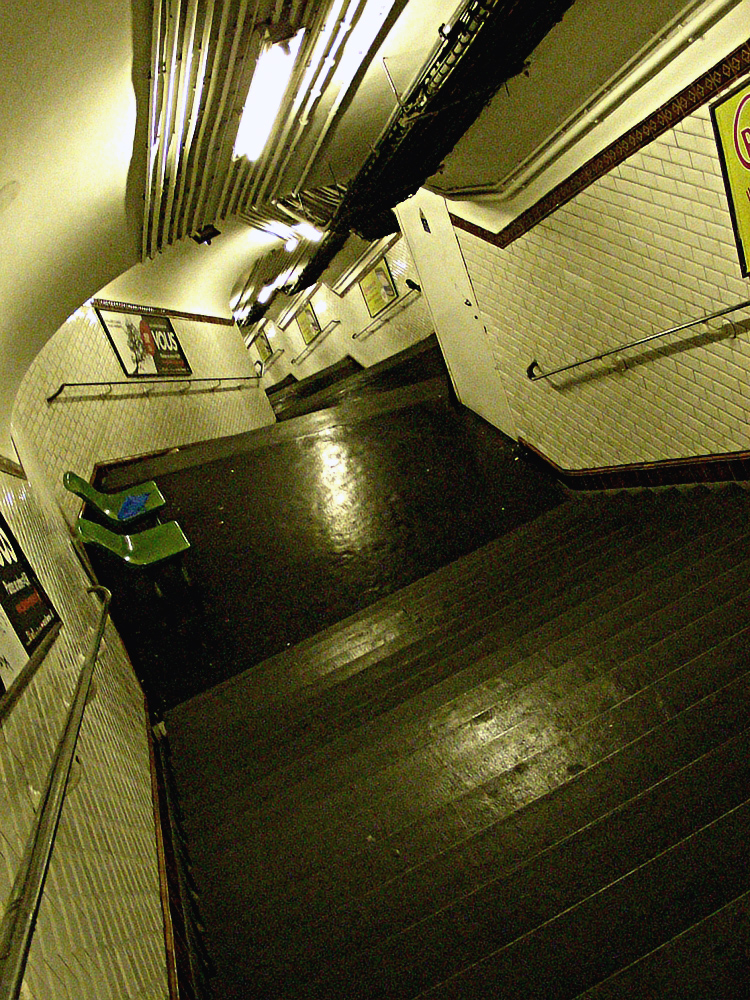
The steep stairs of Télégraphe station

The supplementary network approved in 1909 provided for a short line linking the Place de la République to the Porte des Lilas. This section was declared to be of public utility (a must before starting construction works on public projects in France) by the law of 30 March 1910 but was not built straightaway.

On 29 December 1922, the Paris City Council relaunched the project and voted to create a line to better serve the working-class neighbourhoods of north-east Paris by connecting the Belleville district to the Châtelet district in the city centre. This line was intended to replace the Belleville funicular tramway and the bus lines in the north-east of the capital. It would connect Châtelet station (on Avenue Victoria) to the Porte des Lilas via the Place de la République and the Belleville district.

The line was originally intended to follow Rue de Belleville for its entire length, but a small route detour connected it to Place des Fêtes in order to provide a connection with then-Line 7, at the cost of passing under buildings for around 800 m (2,600 ft). Similarly, it was planned to connect République and Hôtel de Ville stations through the shortest route as possible, with two stations under the narrow Rue du Temple, but the final route runs further west via Arts et Métiers and the new Rambuteau station.

The section from Place de la République to Avenue Victoria was declared to be of public utility by a decree of 14 May 1925. Work began in September 1931, with the exception of the structure under the Place de la République, which had been built at the same time as lines 8 and 9. It took place in fairly difficult conditions, as the line passed under narrow streets and the foundations of some buildings. The passages under the Coteaux collector, the Saint-Martin canal and above a tunnel on the Petite Ceinture, also proved tricky. Building the Jourdain and Télégraphe stations also proved difficult due to their great depth - 20 m (66 ft) - and the fairly unstable nature of the ground, made up of inconsistent green clay. To the south, near the Seine, the line was built in alluvial soil containing a water table. Despite these difficulties, the infrastructure was handed over to the Compagnie du chemin de fer métropolitain de Paris (CMP) on 3 May 1934 after two and a half years of work.

Last line of the network created before old line 14, it had to pass under all the other metro lines, with the exception of then-line 3 at Porte des Lilas. Line 11 was inaugurated on 28 April 1935. On this occasion, Châtelet (lines 1 and 4) and Pont Notre-Dame - Pont au Change (line 7) stations were connected by an underground corridor to the line 11 station, and united under the name Châtelet in 1934. The new line was 5.5 km (3.4 mi)-long and had twelve stations, all vaulted, with a platform length of 75 m (246 ft). The line was then served by twenty-two four-car trains.

A first extension to Fort de Rosny was declared to be of public utility in 1929. But only one station was built from this project : Mairie des Lilas, opened 7 February 1937, which became the 13th station and terminus of the line. The continuation of this extension was interrupted - then cancelled - by the Second World War. On 12 May 1944, the German army requisitioned the line to establish its underground weapons workshops and closed it to traffic altogether. Indeed, built at great depth, it was out of reach of the allied bombs. After the Liberation, the operation of the metro gradually resumed with difficulty because of the shortage of coal and therefore of electric traction current, but line 11 was the only one that remained closed as a result of serious deterioration of its infrastructure, including the removal of part of the tracks by the Germans. It was necessary to wait until 5 March 1945 for the reopening to the public after essential refurbishment.

=== The experiment of the metro line on rubber tyres ===
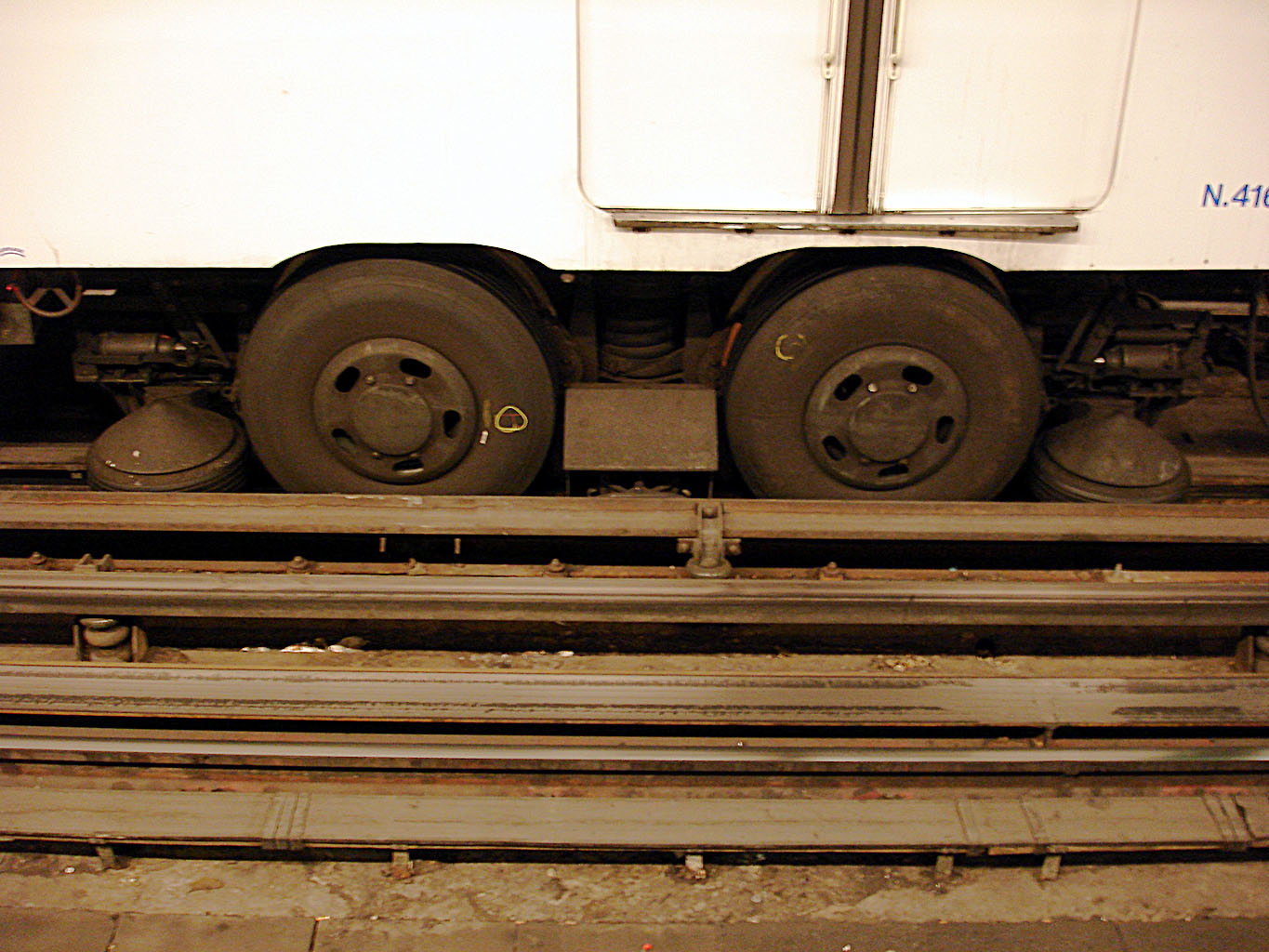
MP 59 tyre-mounted equipment on line 11

Experimentation with rubber-tyred rail vehicles dates back to the 1930s. Rubber-tyred equipment has the advantage of better acceleration and deceleration, which in turn increases the throughput of a line, which is particularly noticeable on a metro line with frequent and closely spaced stops. The technology also reduces rolling noise and vibrations, with the sole con of generating supplemental heat.

In 1950, the first tyres with metal reinforcement appeared on the market, capable of supporting a load of 4 t (4.4 tons) with wheels with a diameter of less than 1 m (3 ft 3 in). The RATP conducted a test campaign in 1951 on the Voie Navette, with a prototype, the MP 51. From 13 April 1952, the public was admitted every afternoon to take the shuttle, which continued its tests until 31 May 1956.

The tests proving conclusive, it was then decided to use this technology on the short, winding and very steep line 11, on a full-scale secondary line before a planned network generalization.

The line was converted to run on rubber tyres during the nights from 1954 to 1956 to not disrupt the line's operation, at the cost of a service reduced by one hour in the evening. Four methods of laying of the tyre tracks were tried, responding to two opposing concepts :

- Limiting as much modification works as possible by keeping the ballast supporting the track as it was.
- Taking advantage of the fact that the elasticity of the track support was no longer useful, being now supported by the rubber tyres, and thus removing the ballast altogether to eliminate the regular ballast re-tamping interventions necessary to ensure correct track geometry.

Video of an MP 59 set at the Châtelet terminus heading towards the turnback facility

The T-layout consisted of bolting azobé bearing parts onto the sleeper heads placed on the ballast; the D-layout fixed the bearing parts onto concrete blocks or blocks cast onto the foundation raft; the I-layout was similar but with injection of cement mortar into the ballast and the S-layout was adopted in stations, with the azobé bearing parts resting on concrete walls cast onto the foundation raft. This latter arrangement improved the appearance and maintenance of the track and reduced the severity of accidents involving people (accidental falls onto the track or suicide) by the presence of a central pit.

The line was equipped with the new MP 55 sets from 1 October 1956 to November 1957 instead of the former Sprague sets, the last of which left the line for good on 11 October 1957. The first rubber-tyred train was inaugurated on 8 November 1956 and the new operation of line 11 began on 13 November 1956, the first day of commercial service. The old sets on the line were then gradually transferred as new sets were delivered, in order to strengthen the service on line 2, the trains of which were to be increased from four to five cars in June 1958. The surplus equipment allowed twenty-nine motor cars and thirty-seven trailers to be removed from service, most of which dated back to 1908 and 1909.

In 1967, the line was equipped with a centralised control centre and automated train operation, which was a first on the Parisian network. The MP 55 sets were gradually withdrawn from 1982 to 1999 and replaced by the MP 59 sets, from line 4. Line 11 had not seen any significant development since that date until the commissioning of the new centralised control centre at Bagnolet on 1 June 2021.

The use of rubber tyres and the steep gradient of the route make line 11 one of the hottest lines on the Paris network, alongside line 4.

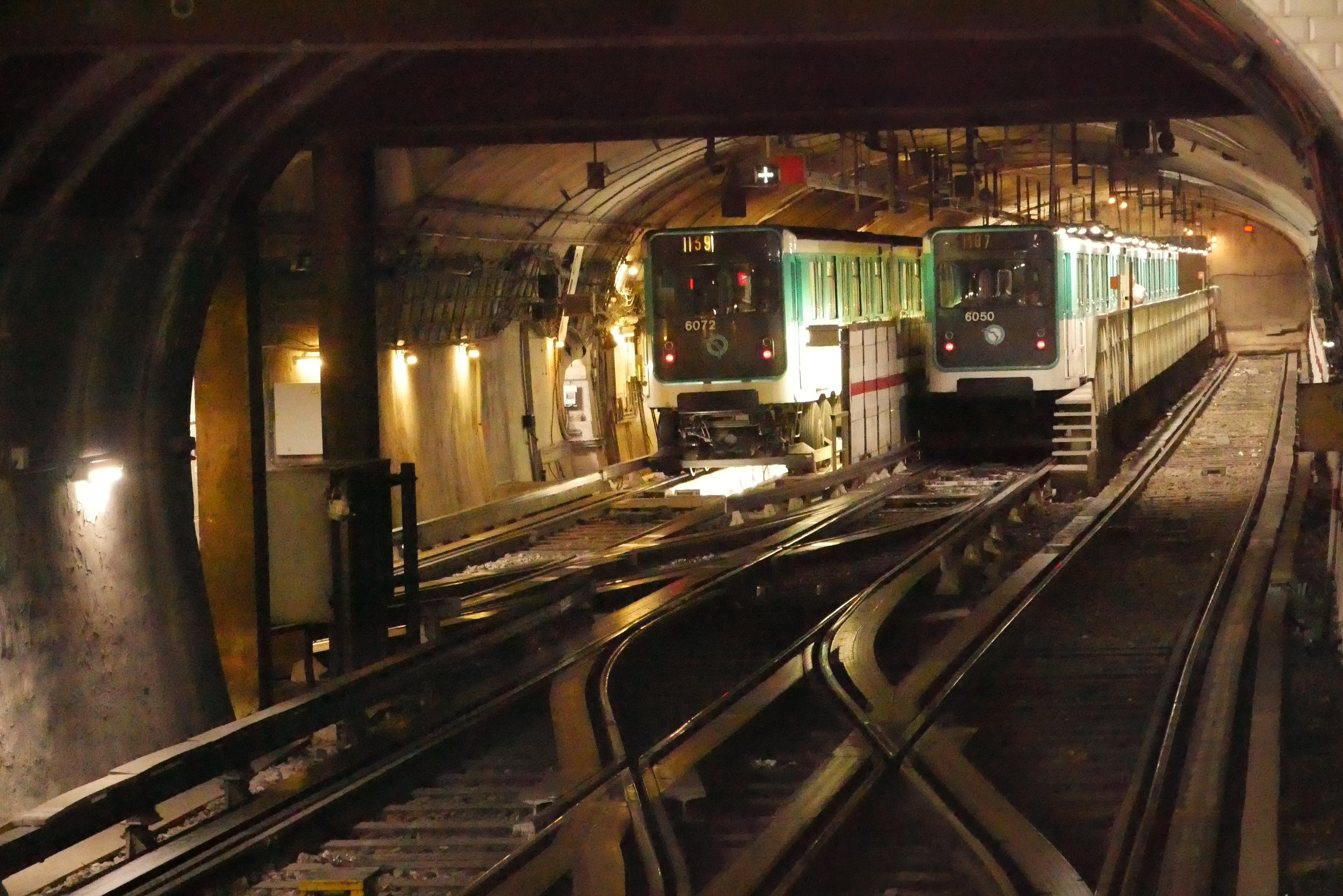
View of the extended rear yard at Châtelet to accommodate longer trains

As part of the extension of the line from Mairie des Lilas to Rosny-Bois-Perrier, most of the stations underwent renovation and adaptation work, including the creation of new access points. The rear yard at Châtelet, which was too short to accommodate the future five-car MP 14 metro trains, had to be extended in limited space under buildings. To carry out this exceptional work, it was necessary to temporarily terminate the line at Hôtel de Ville. The closure at Châtelet, effective on 18 March 2019 was supposed to last until 16 December, but the transport strike which broke out on 5 December 2019 almost completely paralysed operations on the line, so the line was not reopened until 31 December 2019.

=== Extension to Rosny-Bois-Perrier ===
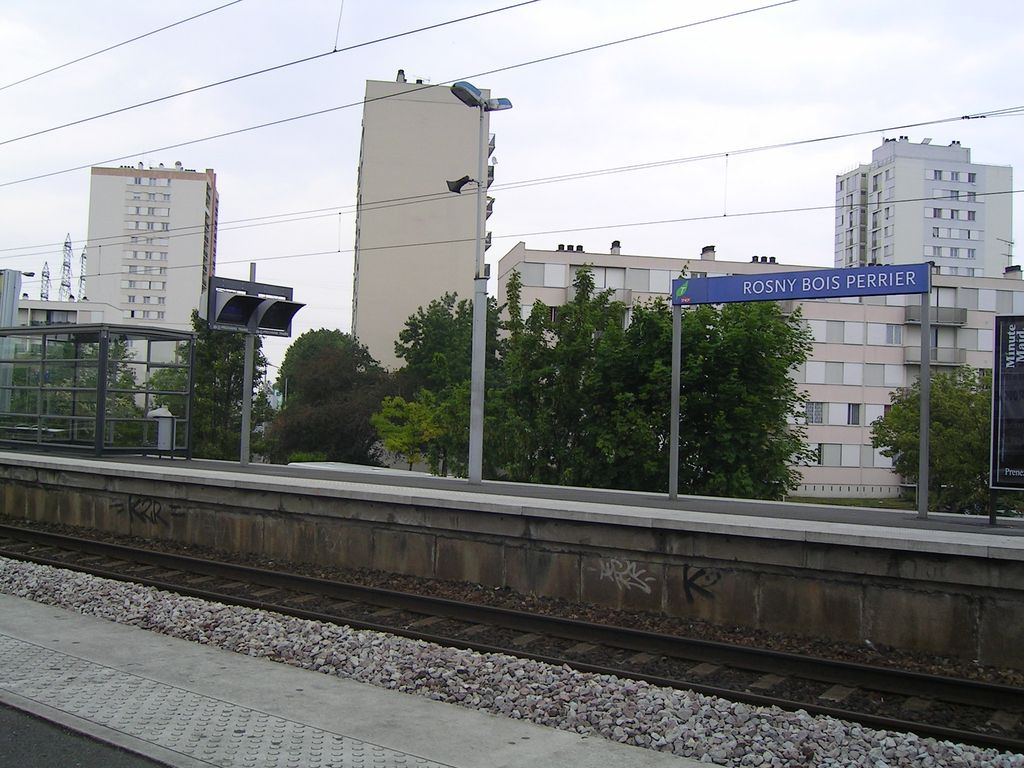
Rosny-Bois-Perrier's RER E platforms, under which the line 11 station is located

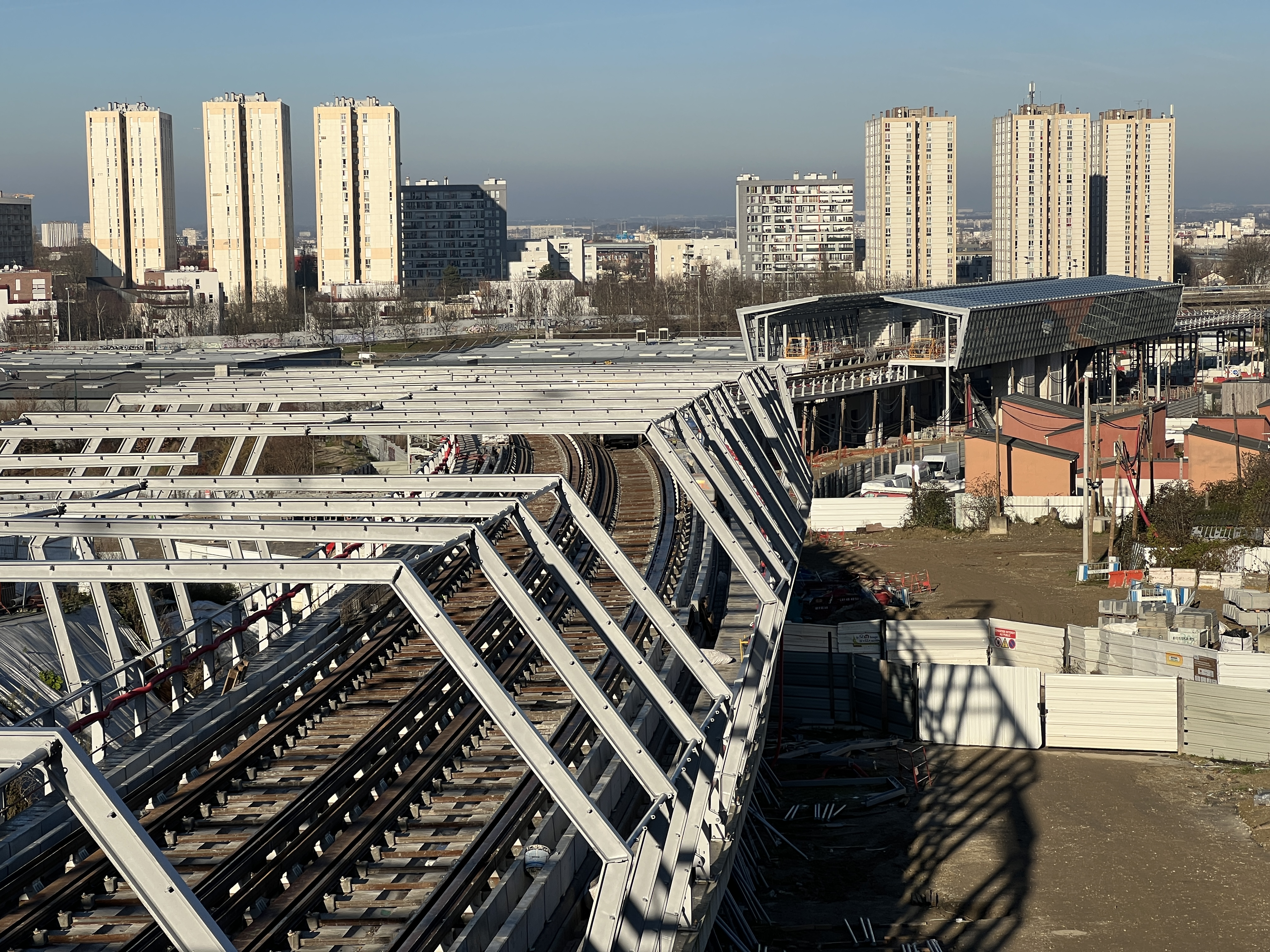
Construction site at Coteaux Beauclair viaduct with the aerial station of the same name in the background, in Rosny-sous-Bois

The municipalities of Romainville, Noisy-le-Sec, Montreuil and Rosny-sous-Bois, as well as the council of Seine-Saint-Denis, had proposed a project to extend the line from Mairie des Lilas to Rosny–Bois-Perrier, an additional 6 km (3.7 mi) to be covered in 12 minutes, with the full journey taking, according to the RATP, 24 minutes from Châtelet to Rosny-Bois-Perrier, compared to 55 minutes at the time. This involved implementing in a new form the former expansion project, by then over a century old. (Note: In 1900, the Romainville municipal council unanimously called for the extension of the metro to this commune)

This extension allows an interconnection with the RER E, as well as direct metro service from Paris to the Rosny 2 shopping centre, a service then only available by bus and RER. One of the new stations, Romainville–Carnot, also provides an interconnection with the future eastbound extension of the T1 tramway to Val de Fontenay. The metro line 15 east section, now set to open by around 2030, will also serve Rosny-Bois-Perrier, eventually allowing an additional transversal rocade connection at this station. All the new stations are accessible to people with reduced mobility and the new MP 14 rolling stock has been put into service on this occasion, in a five-car layout (instead of four since the line's beginning in 1935).

According to RATP studies financed by the 2000-2006 State-Region project contract (Contrat de plan État-région, CPER), this extension would increase the number of passengers on line 11 by 68,700 each working day. The public consultation launched in 2010 estimated the cost of the project at €820m, to which should be added €140m for the renewal of rolling stock and around €100m for the renovation of existing stations. The agreement approved by the STIF on 7 October 2015 set the financing requirement at €1,084m (Île-de-France region €500.3m; SGP €305.3m; State, €214.4m; Seine-Saint-Denis €64m) for the extension, to which must be added €214m (RATP €73m; Paris City €61m; Region €56m; State €24m) for the adaptation of existing stations, and an additional €151m by Île-de-France Mobilités for the rolling stock renewal.

The Region included this project in the Île-de-France Region Master Plan (Schéma directeur de la région Île-de-France, SDRIF) adopted by the Île-de-France Regional Council on 25 September 2008. SDRIF initially planned a phasing, with a first extension to Montreuil–Hôpital between 2007 and 2013, then to Rosny-Bois-Perrier between 2014 and 2020. The 2007–2013 CPER project plans to release €10m in study credits for the extension of the line, officially launching the project. These studies began in 2008 and cover the entire project. A financial envelope of €239m (€168m from the Île-de-France region and €71m from the State) was also voted for several projects, including the extension of line 11.

The STIF made the file of objectives and main characteristics public on 9 December 2009. A consultation was carried out from 6 September 2010 to 8 October 2010, the conclusions of which were published at the beginning of February 2011. It proposes two very similar routes: a first of 6 km (3.7 mi) with five stations roughly alongside the initial project, such as Fort de Rosny and Van der Heyden, before arriving at Rosny-Bois-Perrier by the south ; and a second of 5.5 km (3.4 mi) including similar stations plus an above-ground station before arriving from the north to serve the Londeau district. According to the STIF, 10,100 passengers were expected to use this new extension during the morning peak hour.

The STIF Council approved the results of the consultation on 9 February 2011. Two trends clearly emerged: route 2 was preferred, as it allows opening up the Londeau district in Noisy-le-Sec and would serve two high schools as well as the Domus and Rosny 2 shopping centres in Rosny-sous-Bois. It would also promote the development of the "concerted development zones" (zone d'aménagement concerté, ZACs) in the sector. Further studies therefore exclusively focused on this route. Furthermore, elected officials and residents were resolutely opposed to the project's phasing : as a result, the STIF planned to carry out the expansion work in a single stage. The public inquiry took place from 16 September to 30 October 2013, to which the public inquiry commission gave a favourable opinion without reservations. The project was declared to be of public utility on 28 May 2014. After preparatory work launched in 2015, the structural work began on 10 December 2016 with the line scheduled to open by 2023. The plan for this phase was adopted in September 2015.

As part of the extension, existing stations were developed, including the creation of new access points. The Mairie des Lilas and Porte des Lilas stations were equipped with lifts to provide access for people with reduced mobility; thus, all stations on line 11 between Porte des Lilas and Rosny-Bois-Perrier are now accessible.

At the foot of the future Serge Gainsbourg station, a work pit was shown to elected officials at the end of May 2016. The work continued with the digging of a 3 km (1.9 mi)-tunnel from the new La Dhuys station to Les Lilas, while another 1.5 km (0.93 mi)-section was built in the open, bypassing the Rosny 2 shopping centre.

The excavation of the first lot—3 km (1.9 mi) of tunnel, a 200 m (660 ft)-long covered trench and earthworks as well as the installation of diaphragm walls and shafts for the subsequent construction of four metro stations—was awarded to a group led by Implenia in association with partners in a consortium comprising: NGE, Demathieu Bard and Pizzarotti. The work was due to begin in October 2016.

In August 2018, the A86 was closed to traffic for a week between Rosny-sous-Bois and Nogent-sur-Marne to allow the sliding of a 1,773 t (1,954 tons)-engineering structure under the roadway between the future Coteaux Beauclair and Rosny–Bois-Perrier stations. In June 2019, the extension's opening was officially postponed until 2023. On 20 September 2019, in the presence of regional prefect Michel Cadot, region president Valérie Pécresse and mayor of Paris Anne Hidalgo, the RATP named the tunnel boring machine Sofia (after the station agent of line 11 Sofia Amalou), which began to dig the tunnel between Les Lilas and Rosny-sous-Bois on 16 December. It arrived at Serge Gainsbourg station, its exit point, on 16 July 2021.

In February 2023, Île-de-France Mobilités announced that the line would be closed every Sunday between July and August 2023 to accelerate the extension work. The extension's opening was postponed until spring 2024. The extension was inaugurated and put into service on 13 June 2024, as announced a month earlier.

== Chronology ==
- 1910: Fulgence Bienvenüe's complemental project includes a new metro line to replace the Belleville funicular, from République to Porte des Lilas. This project is declared "d'utilité publique", but is postponed.
- 29 December 1922: Paris' municipal council votes to relaunch the project, as well as an extension from République to Châtelet.
- 1924: The Belleville Funicular ceases operation as the subway is finally put underway.
- 1929: An extension from Porte des Lilas to Fort de Rosny is declared "d'utilité publique", but only one station came out of the project.
- 28 April 1935: Line 11 was inaugurated from Châtelet to Porte des Lilas.
- 17 February 1937: The line was extended from Porte des Lilas to Mairie des Lilas, according to the 1929 extension project.
- 12 May 1944: German Wehrmacht orders the line's closure, and uses it for weapon and bomb storage, safe from the allies.
- 5 March 1945: Line 11 reopens as the Germans withdraw.
- 8 November 1956: Due to steep slopes, the rails were adapted to rubber-tyred train operation. Sprague-Thomson trains are progressively replaced by MP 55 rolling stock.
- 1976: 8 MP 73 trains from Line 6 are transferred to line 11 for reinforcements.
- 1995: 24 MP 59 trains, from lines 4 and 1 respectively, are transferred to Line 11 in preparation for the removal of MP 55 trains from service.
- 30 January 1999: The last MP 55 train is removed from service.
- 1 June 2021: The line's centralized command center is opened at Bagnolet.
- 1 June 2023: Cascading of MP 59 to MP 14CC rolling stock begins.
- 1 July 2023: Line 11's historical workshops at Les Lilas, is closed in favour of the new one at Rosny-sous-Bois.
- 29 April 2024: MP14 rolling stocks start test running the new section from Mairie des Lilas to Rosny–Bois-Perrier
- 23 May 2024: Ceremonial withdrawn of MP 59.
- 12 June 2024: The final MP 59 trainsets are retired from service.
- 13 June 2024: The line was extended from Mairie des Lilas to Rosny–Bois-Perrier.

== Map ==
Line 11's on-board diagram, featuring its transfers

Geographically accurate map of Line 11

== Stations ==
| Station | Image | Commune | Opened | Interchanges | Distance (in km) | |
|---|---|---|---|---|---|---|
| Châtelet | | Paris (1st, 4th) | 28 April 1935 | (at Châtelet–Les Halles) | – | 0.0 |
| Hôtel de Ville | | Paris (4th) | 28 April 1935 | Paris Metro Paris Metro Line 1 | 0.3 | 0.3 |
| Rambuteau; Centre Georges Pompidou | | Paris (3rd, 4th) | 28 April 1935 | | 0.5 | 0.8 |
| Arts et Métiers | | Paris (3rd) | 28 April 1935 | Paris Metro Paris Metro Line 3 | 0.5 | 1.3 |
| République | | Paris (3rd, 10th, 11th) | 28 April 1935 | Paris Metro Paris Metro Line 3 Paris Metro Line 5 Paris Metro Line 8 Paris Metro Line 9 | 0.6 | 1.9 |
| Goncourt; Hôpital Saint-Louis | | Paris (10th, 11th) | 28 April 1935 | | 0.6 | 2.5 |
| Belleville | | Paris (10th, 11th, 19th, 20th) | 28 April 1935 | Paris Metro Paris Metro Line 2 | 0.5 | 3.0 |
| Pyrénées | | Paris (19th, 20th) | 28 April 1935 | | 0.6 | 3.6 |
| Jourdain | | Paris (19th, 20th) | 28 April 1935 | | 0.3 | 3.9 |
| Place des Fêtes | | Paris (19th) | 28 April 1935 | Paris Metro Paris Metro Line 7bis | 0.3 | 4.2 |
| Télégraphe | | Paris (19th, 20th) | 28 April 1935 | | 0.5 | 4.7 |
| Porte des Lilas | | Paris (19th, 20th) | 28 April 1935 | Paris Metro Paris Metro Line 3bis Tramways in Île-de-France Île-de-France tramway Line 3b | 0.6 | 5.3 |
| Mairie des Lilas | | Les Lilas | 17 February 1937 | | 0.8 | 6.1 |
| Serge Gainsbourg | | Les Lilas | 13 June 2024 | | 0.8 | 6.9 |
| Romainville–Carnot | | Romainville, Noisy-le-Sec | 13 June 2024 | | 1.1 | 8.0 |
| Montreuil–Hôpital | | Montreuil, Noisy-le-Sec | 13 June 2024 | | 1.3 | 9.3 |
| Rosny-sous-Bois–Montreuil; La Dhuys | | Montreuil, Rosny-sous-Bois | 13 June 2024 | | 0.8 | 10.1 |
| Noisy-le-Sec–Rosny-sous-Bois; Coteaux Beauclair | | Noisy-le-Sec, Rosny-sous-Bois | 13 June 2024 | | 0.5 | 10.6 |
| Rosny–Bois-Perrier | | Rosny-sous-Bois | 13 June 2024 | RER RER E | 1.3 | 11.9 |

== Rolling stock ==
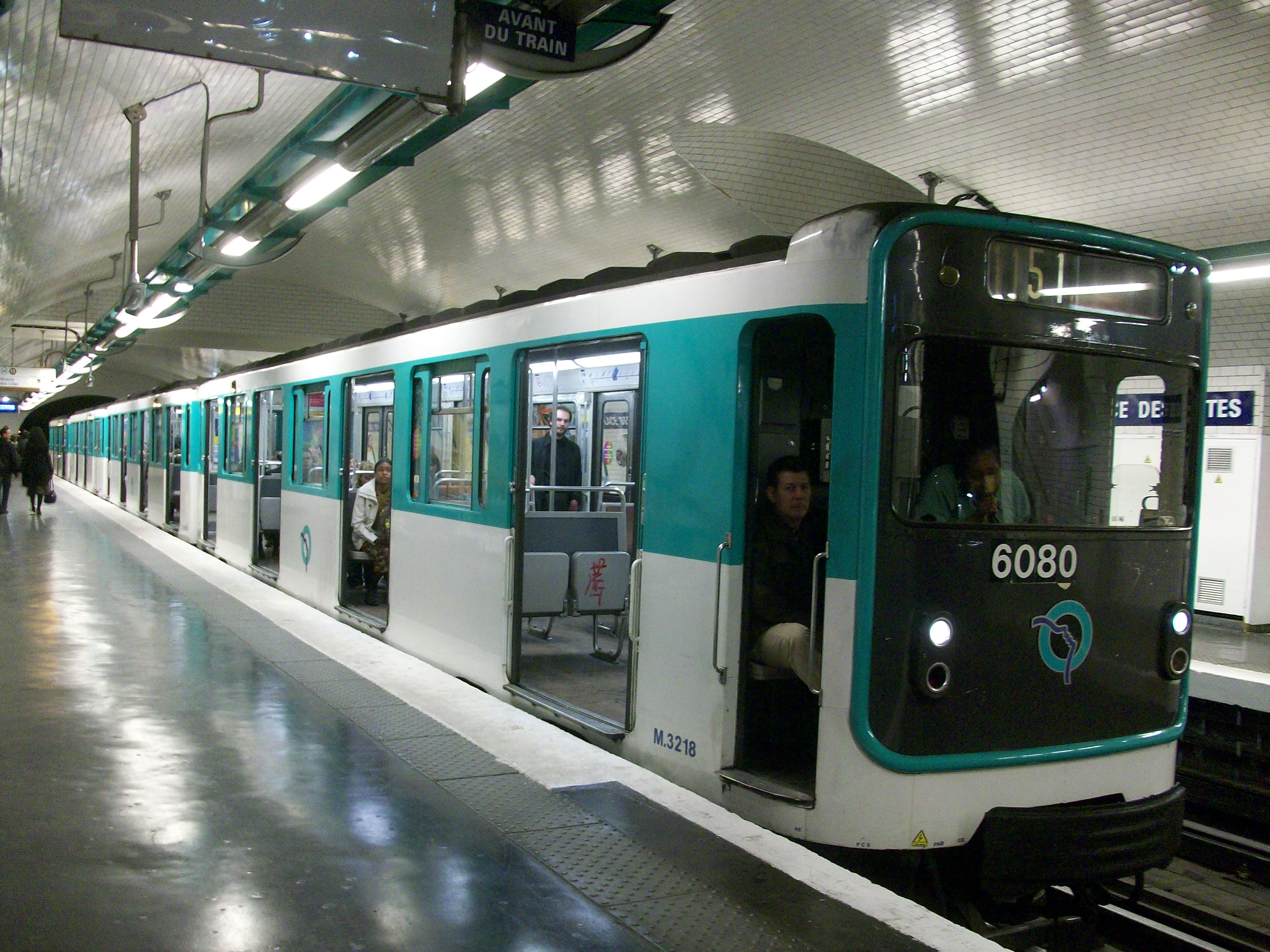
An MP 59-trainset, this model was fully retired from the line on 12 June 2024.

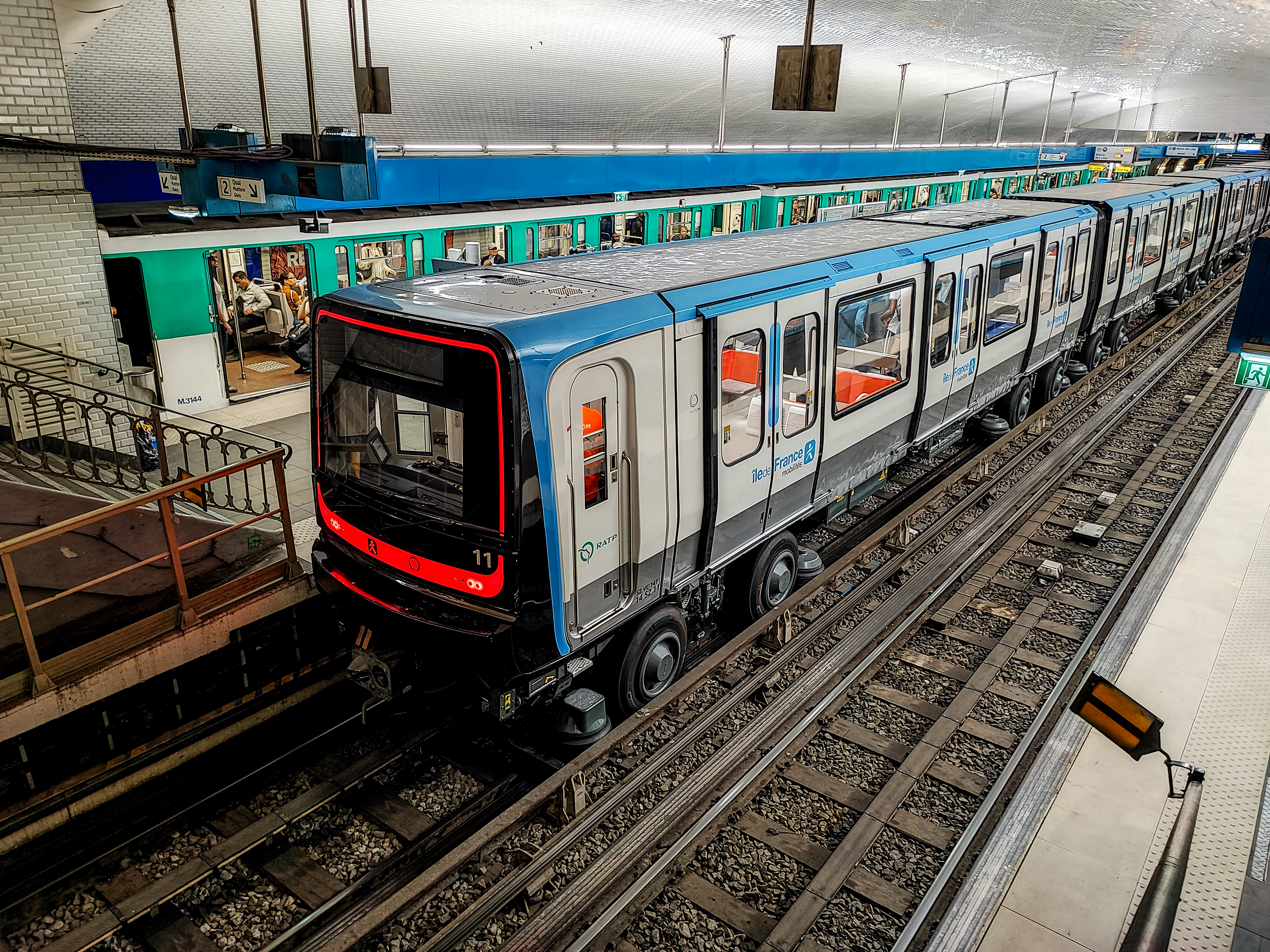
An MP 14 trainset from 1 June 2023, in front of an MP 59 from 1963, at Châtelet.

Being the first metro line to be converted to rubber-tyred pneumatic operation, the first set of rubber-tyred rolling stock to be in service on Line 11 was the MP 55, which operated from October 1956 through January 1999. They were then replaced by refurbished MP 59 stock from Line 4. The MP 55 stock consisted of 4 carriages, as well as the current MP 59 stock. One MP 73 of line 6 was in service on line 11 as well.

The plan, according to Île-de-France Mobilités, was to replace the fleet of Line 11 with the MP 14 series, around the time when the extension to Rosny-sous-Bois opened. Although the new trains will be driver-operated in the same method as the current fleet, they will be 5 cars long, and have open gangways.

An initial 20 trains were ordered in February 2018 with an additional 19 trains ordered in July 2021. Production began in late 2020, with testing in summer 2021.

In June 2023, new MP 14 CC (manual transit) were deployed with four new trains entering in service each Tuesdays in exchange of four MP 59 transferred to Rosny-sous-Bois workshop on Mondays-sunset to be retired. Twenty new MP 14 trans will be deployed until the Summer 2023, nineteen new trains needed to be deployed in spring 2024 due to the extension to Rosny–Bois-Perrier.

One of the last MP 59 on 12 June 2024, during their final day run.

The ceremonial final runs of the MP 59 took place on 23 May 2024. But the last trains were withdrawn on 12 June 2024.

== Future ==
A revised plan for the proposed Grand Paris Express project was unveiled on 6 March 2013. The revisions call for a second extension of Line 11 towards Noisy-Champs, considered a part of the Grand Paris Express project, by 2030, although it is unclear if this goal will be attainable. Should the second extension commence, it is slated to come with a full automation of Line 11. Automation was not implemented with the Rosny extension, though the RATP and STIF had considered the possibility of automating the line later on.

== Tourism ==
Line 11 passes near several places of interest :

- The Forum des Halles Shopping Centre and gardens, as well as Châtelet-les-Halles transport hub (Châtelet)
- Hôtel de Ville (City Hall) of Paris (Hôtel de ville)
- The Centre Georges Pompidou accommodating the Paris Museum of Modern Art. (Rambuteau)
- The Conservatoire National des Arts et Métiers (engineering school) (Arts et Métiers).
- The popular Belleville district, hosting one of Paris' "Chinatowns" and centres of other Asian cultures (Belleville).
- The Belleville and Buttes-Chaumont urban parks (Pyrenées)
- The Mouzaïa district (Place des Fêtes)
- The Trianon movie theater (Romainville-Carnot)
- The Domus commercial centre (Côteaux-Beauclair)
- The Rosny 2 commercial centre (Rosny–Bois-Perrier)

== See also ==
- Paris
- Transport in Paris
- List of Paris Metro stations
- List of Réseau Express Régional stations
- List of metro systems
- Rail transport in France

== Sources ==
- Gasnault, François; Zuber, Henri, eds. (1997). Métro-Cité : le chemin de fer métropolitain à la conquête de Paris, 1871-1945. Paris: les musées de la ville de Paris. p. 191. ISBN 2-87900-374-1.
- Guerrand, Roger-Henri (1986). L'aventure du métropolitain (in French). Paris: Éditions La Découverte. ISBN 978-2-707-11642-0. OCLC 319765831.
- Jacobs, Gaston (2001). Le métro de Paris: un siècle de matériel roulant (in French). Paris: Vie du rail. ISBN 978-2-902-80897-7. OCLC 422048868.
- Lamming, Clive (2015). La grande histoire du métro de parisien de 1900 à nos jours (in French). Évreux: Atlas. p. 99. ISBN 978-2-344-00403-6.
- Lamming, Clive (2001). Métro insolite: promenades curieuses, lignes oubliées, stations fantômes, métros imaginaires, rames en tous genres (in French). ISBN 978-2-840-96190-1. OCLC 47743514.
- Ovenden, Mark; Pepinster, Julian; Pontremoli, Pascal (2015). L'histoire du Métro parisien racontée par ses plans: plans, stations et design du métro (in French). Paris: La Vie du Rail. p. 68. ISBN 978-2-37062-015-6.
- Robert, Jean (1983). Notre Métro. Paris: éd. Jean Robert.
- Sirand-Pugnet, Bernard (1997). De la Grand-mère à Météor : 45 ans d'évolution de la technologie des voies au métro de Paris (in French). Boulogne: ID. ISBN 978-2-912-25200-5. OCLC 42080501.
- Tricoire, Jean (1999). Un siècle de métro en 14 lignes. De Bienvenüe à Météor (in French). Éditions La Vie du Rail. ISBN 978-2-902-80887-8. OCLC 42933803.
- Zuber, Henri; et al. (1996). Le patrimoine de la RATP (in French). Charenton-le-Pont: Flohic éditions. ISBN 978-2-842-34007-0. OCLC 36719141.
