= Belleville funicular tramway =

Coordinates: 48.8726°N 2.3791°E

Belleville funicular tramway Tramway funiculaire de Belleville
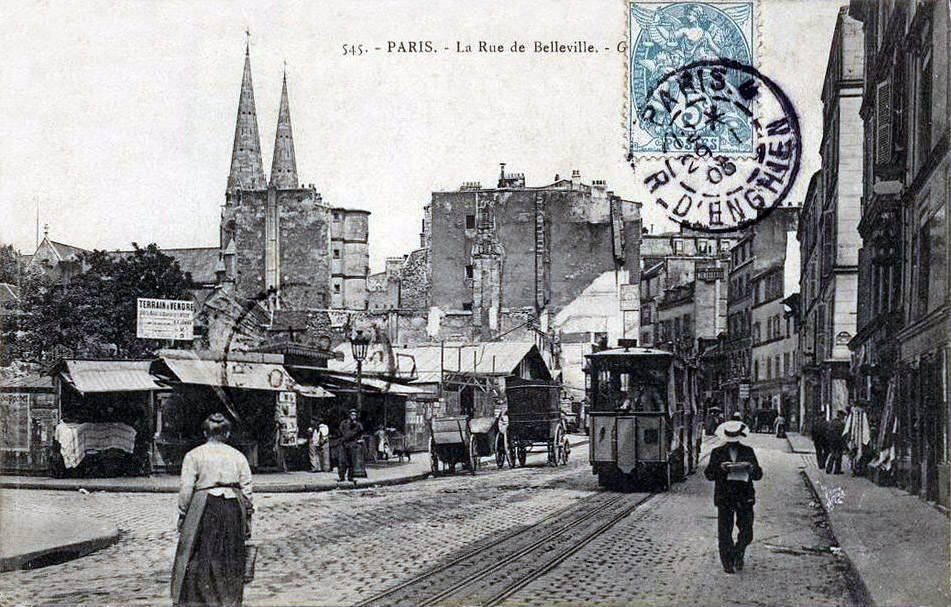
- The funicular tramway on the Rue de Belleville, c. 1900.

Overview
- Status: Closed; Paris Metro Line 11 now uses the route
- Owner: Ville de Paris
- Locale: Belleville quarter of Paris, France
- Termini: Place de la République; Église Saint-Jean-Baptiste de Belleville

Service
- Type: Cable car
- Operator(s): Compagnie funiculaire de Belleville
- Depot(s): 97 Rue de Belleville
- Rolling stock: 21 bespoke cars
- Ridership: 5.241 million (1902)

History
- Opened: 25 August 1891
- Closed: 18 July 1924

Technical
- Line length: 2,044 m (2,235 yd) or 2,325 m (2,543 yd)
- Number of tracks: 1, with passing loops
- Track gauge: 1,000 mm (3 ft 3 3/8 in)
- Operating speed: 3 m/s (11 km/h; 6.7 mph) (day); 3.5 m/s (13 km/h; 7.8 mph) (night)

The Belleville funicular tramway (French: tramway funiculaire de Belleville) was a cable car which from 1891 to 1924 connected the Place de la République in Paris to the Église Saint-Jean-Baptiste de Belleville, on a hill in the Belleville quarter. It has since been demolished.

The line was a tram-funicular hybrid, similar to the San Francisco cable car system (started 1873), and the Ascensor da Bica in Lisbon. It was replaced in 1935 by Paris Metro Line 11, running on the same route.

== History ==
In the late 1880s, the need to serve the busy quarter of Belleville led to consideration of setting up a cable car line, uniquely able to manage the hill's inclination. But unlike San Francisco and other American cities where this new system was operating, which had wide roads on grid plans, the width of the Paris roads required a single track railway with plenty of passing loops along its rather meandering route.

In 1886, one Mr. Fournier submitted a request for a concession. After much deliberation by the Ville de Paris, the Ministry of Public Works, the Ministry of the Interior and the Corps of Bridges and Roads, and the virulent protests of the Compagnie générale des omnibus, who saw it breaking their monopoly, the line was given its Déclaration d'utilité publique ("Public Utility Declaration") by a decree of 24 January 1889 under the jurisdiction of a Voie ferrée d'intérêt local under the control of the Conseil général of the Seine Department. A contract was signed on 7 August 1890 between the Department and Fournier, which provided for the construction of a line by the Ville de Paris and its operation by Fournier, who passed it over to the Compagnie du funiculaire de Belleville.

The funicular tramway became operational on 25 August 1891. The line started at the Place de la Republique, going up the Rue du Faubourg-du-Temple and the Rue de Belleville to its terminus in front of the Église Saint-Jean-Baptiste de Belleville. Its total length was 2,044 m (2,235 yd) or 2,325 m (2,543 yd) of single track with a crossings over the Canal Saint-Martin and four others at the crossroads of the Avenue Parmentier, of the Boulevard de Belleville, of the Rue Julien-Lacroix and of the Rue des Pyrénées. Its gradient was fairly steep, starting with a shallow slope but climbing the hill with gradients of at least 3.4% (1:30) but as high as 7% (1:14), with several tight curves.

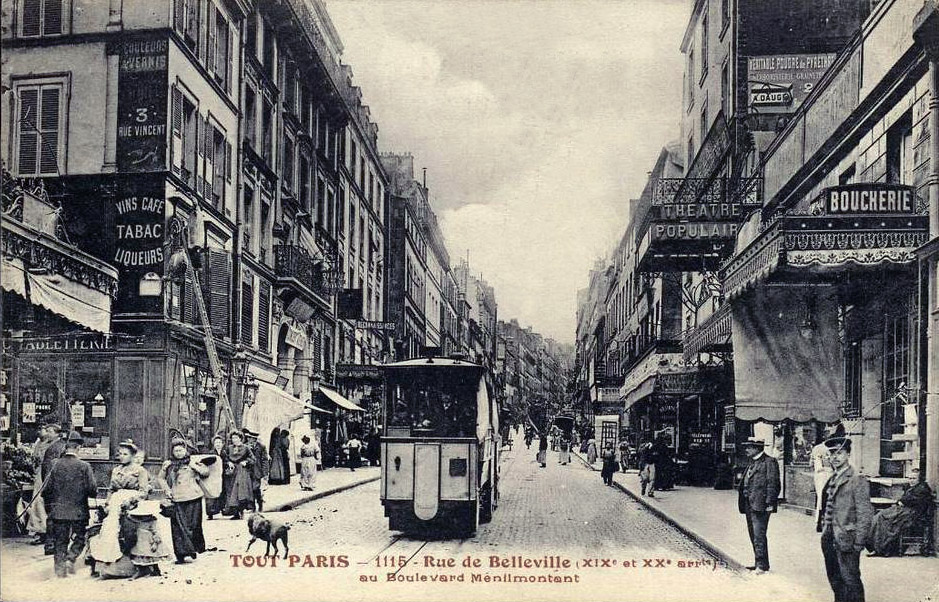
A tramway car on the Rue de Belleville, c. 1900.

The line quickly became popular: in 1895, it transported 4.411 million passengers. The line quickly reached capacity, and because it was impossible to add more passing loops, the line was operated in "bursts" (French: rafale), with several vehicles closely following each other very closely. But this operation was particularly dangerous for pedestrians and road traffic. So it was decided to operate two cars together as a train, and their end platforms were extended over the couplings, increasing each car's capacity to 57 passengers. 1902 became the record year for the line, with 5.241 million passengers.

On 31 May 1910, the concession ended and the Ville de Paris took over operation as a Régie en droit public français ("French public service authority"). During the First World War the line was underfunded, and at its close needed heavy repairs to continue service. But operations finally ceased on 18 July 1924, and the tramway was replaced by a bus line called the "BF", operated by Schneider H buses with their front seats removed to increase capacity. This route was subsequently incorporated into the network of the Société des transports en commun de la région parisienne (STCRP). The infrastructure of the funicular tramway was demolished, the cars were sold for scrap, and for many months were held somewhere in Issy-les-Moulineaux. In 1935, Paris Metro Line 11 opened on the same route, extended at each end.

== Technical characteristics ==
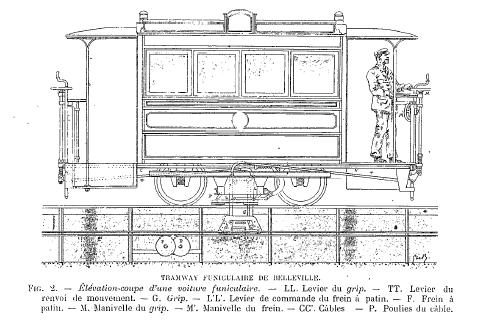
Design drawing. Text reads: TRAMWAY FUNICULAIRE DE BELLEVILLE. Fig 2. Élevation-coupe d'une voiture funiculaire. — LL. Levier du grip. — TT. Levier du reavoi du mouvement. — G. Grip. — L'L'. Levier de commande du frein à patin. — F. Frein à patin. — M. Mainvelle du grip. M'. Mainvelle du frein. — CC. Càbles. — P. Poulies du càble.

The tracks of the funicular tramway were built at 1,000 mm (3 ft 3 3/8 in) with a central access channel which gave exclusive access to apparatus in a groove 29 mm (1.1 in) from street level. The U-shaped rails, of the Broca system, were set into the road surface, with 9 to 12 m (30 to 39 ft) blocks housing the traction cable, which was of 29 mm (1.1 in) diameter and weighed 3 kg/m (2.0 lb/ft). The cable was of hemp rope reinforced by six steel strands. The breaking strain of the cable was 6 tonnes (6 long tons; 7 short tons).

Each terminus on the line was equipped with a pulley of 2.50 m (8 ft 2.4 in) diameter, mounted horizontally under the pavement, which drove the endless traction cable. The cable passed over another tension wheel, which compensated for cable stretch.

The system was driven by two 50 hp (37 kW) Corliss steam engines, installed in the depot at 97 Rue de Belleville.

The 21 cars were each 5 m (16 ft 5 in) long and only 1.6 m (5 ft 3 in) wide, accommodating 22 passengers on four longitudinal bench seats. The rolling stock was never upgraded; the cars remained gaslit (with acetylene) and were unheated because of the short journey time.

The vehicles were equipped with a "grip" system, detachable pincers which took hold of the cable in the underground channel. To put the vehicle in motion, the driver progressively tightened the grip. This action, repeated several thousand times, limited the cable's lifetime to less than six months. The cable ran in the channel at a speed of 3 m/s (11 km/h; 6.7 mph) by day, and 3.5 m/s (13 km/h; 7.8 mph) by night, when there was less traffic. To stop the car, the driver used a handbrake which acted on the wheels. Brake pads also acted against the rails.

The infrastructure was built by the Ville de Paris, directed by its chief engineer Fulgence Bienvenüe, better known as the architect of the Paris Metro.

== Operation ==
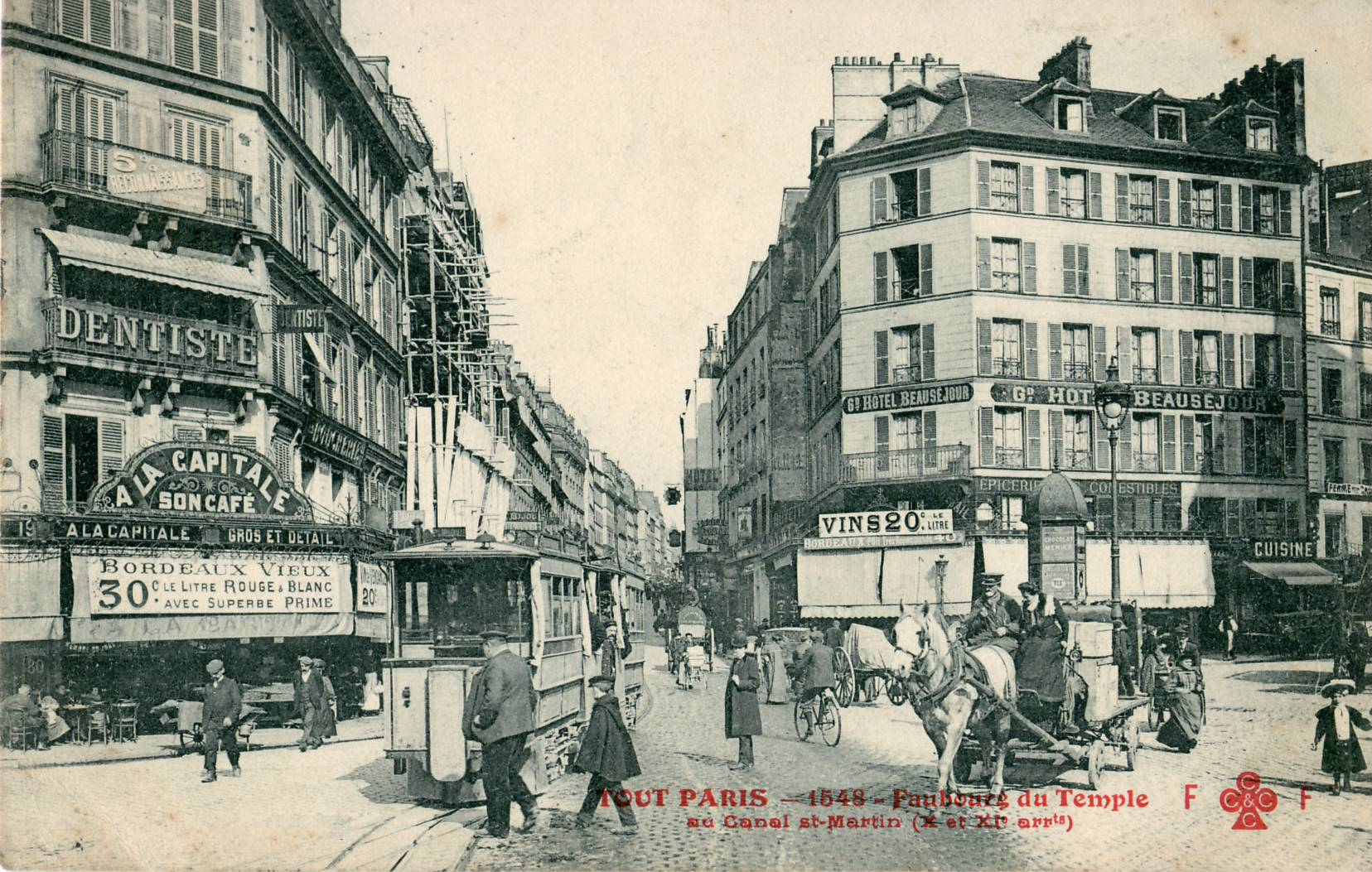
A two-car train in the Rue du Faubourg-du-Temple

The funicular tramway served a populous quarter of Paris. Because of this, the flat rate fare was quite low, 10 centimes, and there were half-rate worker's fares at the start and end of the day. Despite the low fares, its popularity made the company extremely profitable.

Tramway operations barely changed throughout the line's existence: a departure every 11 minutes from 5am to 6am, then every 6 minutes from 6am until 12.30am. The total number of daily departures was as high as 364 in winter, and 382 in summer, with respectively 37 and 30 in the morning at half rate.

=== Accidents ===
Operational accidents were relatively rare, and mostly related to cable wear. If the cable broke it would wind around the grip, preventing the cars from stopping and causing them to overturn or run into those that had managed to disengage the grip in time. This could cause havoc in the streets.

But the steep slope of the Rue de Belleville caused the more spectacular accidents. The greatest was on 6 January 1906, when a ruptured grip resulted in a runaway car. It continued the whole length of the Rue de Belleville, crossing the Rue des Pyrénées at nearly 120 km/h (75 mph) (according to the press reports) before being derailed and overturning in the Rue du Faubourg-du-Temple. The passengers panicked and ran, causing 17 injuries. In 1907 and 1909, brake failures caused two collisions between the tramcars and Mekarski system cars at the Rue des Pyrénées crossroads.

== In popular fiction ==
In La Livrée du crime, Pierre Souvestre and Marcel Allain describe Fantômas taking the funicular on return from a meeting with the Apaches.

== See also ==
- Tram
- Funicular
- Paris Metro Line 11
- Belleville (commune)

== Sources ==
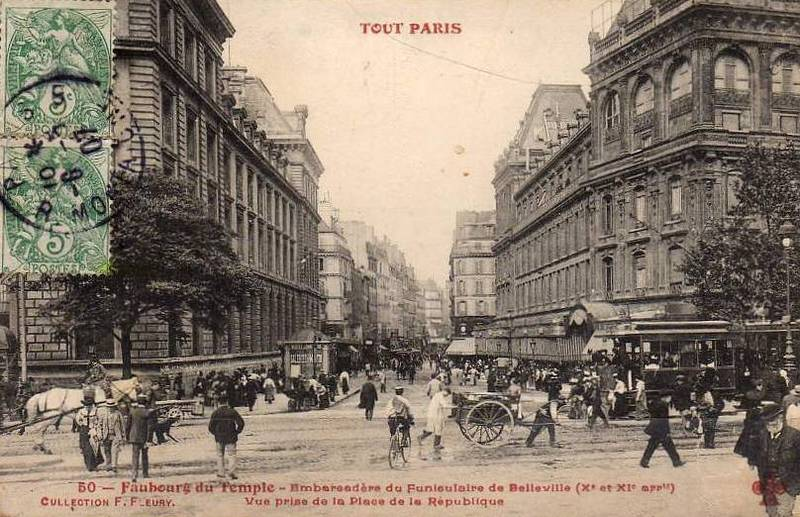
The tramway platform, seen from the Place de la République.

- Gennesseaux, Jean (1992). Funiculaires et crémaillères de France [French Funiculars and rack railways] (in French). La Vie du Rail. ISBN 978-2-902808-42-7.
- Robert, Jean (1992). Les tramways parisiens [Paris tramways] (in French).
- De Burgraff, G.; Thompson, Joe (tr.) (1890). "Le Tramway funiculaire de Belleville". Le Magasin Pittoresque. 2 (in French and English). 58 (8).
- Hélène, Maxime (4 October 1890). "Le funiculaire de Belleville à Paris". La Nature (in French). 18 (2nd quarter 1890) (905). Masson: 283–299. ISSN 0369-3392.
- Hallsted-Beaumert, Sheila (1996). de Andia, Béatrice (ed.). "Le funiculaire de Belleville: politique municipale et transports publics à Paris". Le XIX^{e} arrondissement, une cité nouvelle ("The 19th arrondissement, a new city"). Délégation à l'action artistique de la Ville de Paris: 202–204.
