= Mairie des Lilas station =

Metro station in Les Lilas, France

Mairie des Lilas
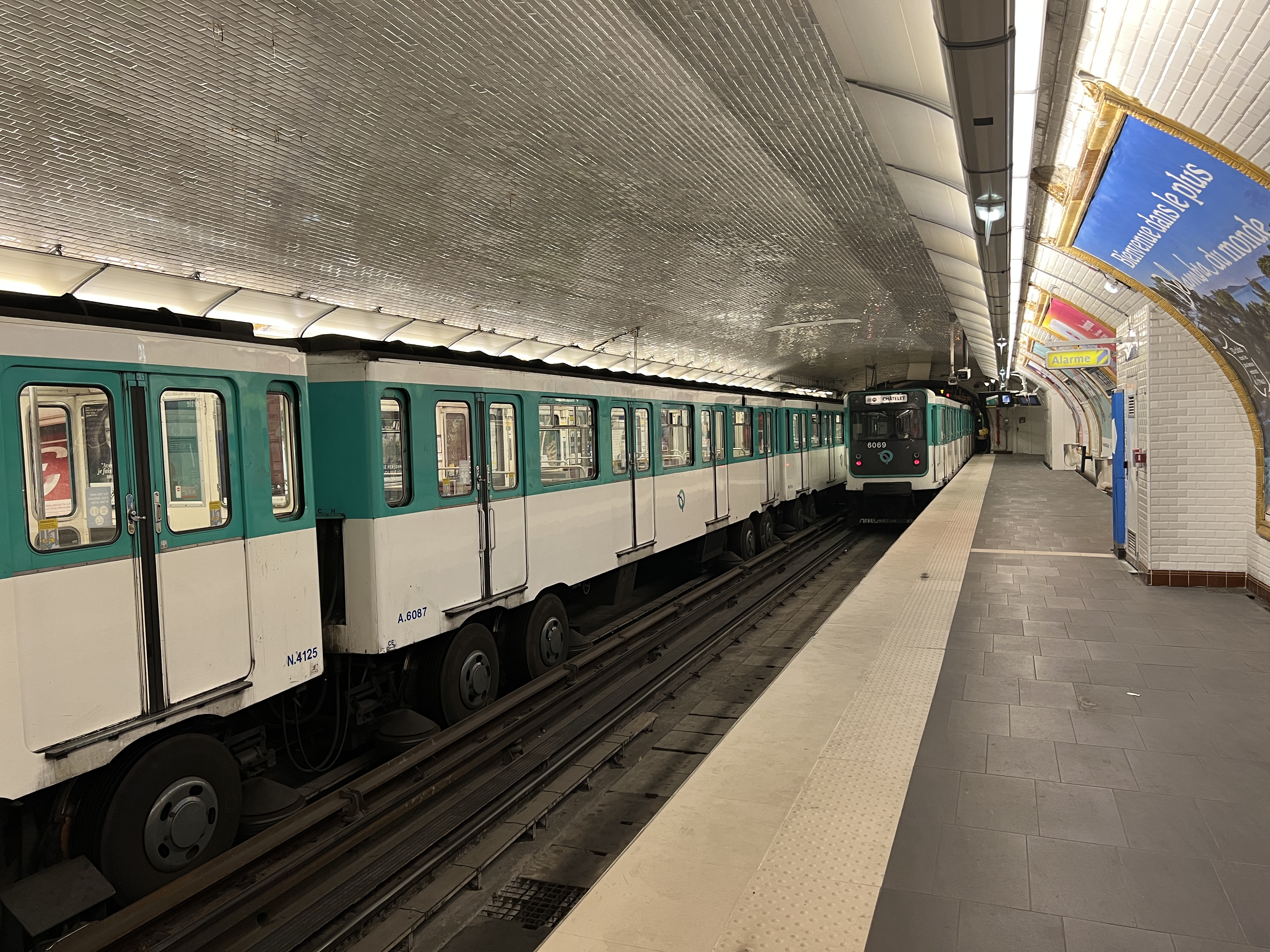
- Mairie des Lilas station Platforms

General information
- Location: Les Lilas; Île-de-France; France
- Coordinates: 48°52′47″N 2°24′59″E
- Owner: RATP
- Operator: RATP
- Platforms: 2 (side platforms)
- Tracks: 2

Construction
- Accessible: Yes

Other information
- Station code: 23-03
- Fare zone: 1

History
- Opened: 17 February 1937

Passengers
- 2,563,685 (2020)

Services
Preceding station	Paris Metro	Following station
Porte des Lilas towards Châtelet	Line 11	Serge Gainsbourg towards Rosny–Bois-Perrier
Location
- Location within Paris

Mairie des Lilas (French pronunciation: [mɛʁi de lilɑ]) is a station of the Paris Metro in the commune of Les Lilas and was formerly the eastern terminus of Line 11. It is named after the town hall of Les Lilas. A small underground depot is located near the station to service the trains of Line 11. The station is sometimes believed to be the subject of the Serge Gainsbourg song "Le Poinçonneur des Lilas", about a métro ticket inspector, although the promotional film for it was filmed at the Porte des Lilas.

== History ==
The station opened as part of the extension of the line from Porte des Lilas on 17 February 1937. As part of the Un métro + beau programme by the RATP, the station's platform lighting was modernised during the course of the 2000s while the corridors were renovated 28 June 2018.

As part of modernization works for the extension of the line to Rosny–Bois-Perrier in 2023 for the Grand Paris Express, the station was closed from 26 June 2021 to 29 August 2021 to raise its platform levels, its surface tiled, and to widen and lengthen the tunnels at the end of the station. This is to accommodate the new rolling stock that will be used (MP 14) to accommodate the expected increase in passengers and to make it accessible to people with reduced mobility. Two new entrances will also be added with the one at Place du Colonel-Fabien having 2 lifts.

In 2019, the station was used by 4,436,148 passengers, making it the 101st busiest of the Metro network out of 302 stations.

In 2020, the station was used by 2,563,685 passengers amidst the COVID-19 pandemic, making it the 82nd busiest of the Metro network out of 305 stations.

== Passenger services ==
=== Access ===
The station has 2 entrances:

- Entrance 1: rue de Paris
- Entrance 2: Boulevard de la Liberté

=== Station layout ===
Street Level
B1	Mezzanine
Line 11 platforms	Side platform, doors will open on the right
Line 11 platforms	Southbound	← toward Châtelet (Porte des Lilas)
Line 11 platforms	Northbound	toward Rosny–Bois-Perrier (Serge Gainsbourg) →
Line 11 platforms	Side platform, doors will open on the right

=== Platforms ===
The station has a standard configuration with two tracks surrounded by two side platforms, seventy-five metres long and the vault is elliptical. The lighting canopies are white and rounded in the Gaudin style of the nouveau du métro des années 2000s renovation, and the bevelled white ceramic tiles cover the walls, the vault and the tunnel exits. The advertising frames are made of honey-coloured earthenware with plant motifs and the name of the station is also incorporated into the wall tiles, in the interwar decorative style of the original CMP. The platforms are tiled in anthracite grey and the Akiko style seats are green (replacing the Motte seats of the same colour which were only fitted to the platform in the direction of Châtelet, then dedicated to boarding). The station is distinguished by the relative narrowness of its platforms given the narrower width of the road on the surface, as well as by the lower part of the wall which is vertical and not elliptical as a result.

=== Other connections ===
The station is also served by lines 105, 129, 515 (TillBus), and P'tit Bus of the RATP bus network, and at night, by lines N12 and N23 of the Noctilien bus network.

== Gallery ==
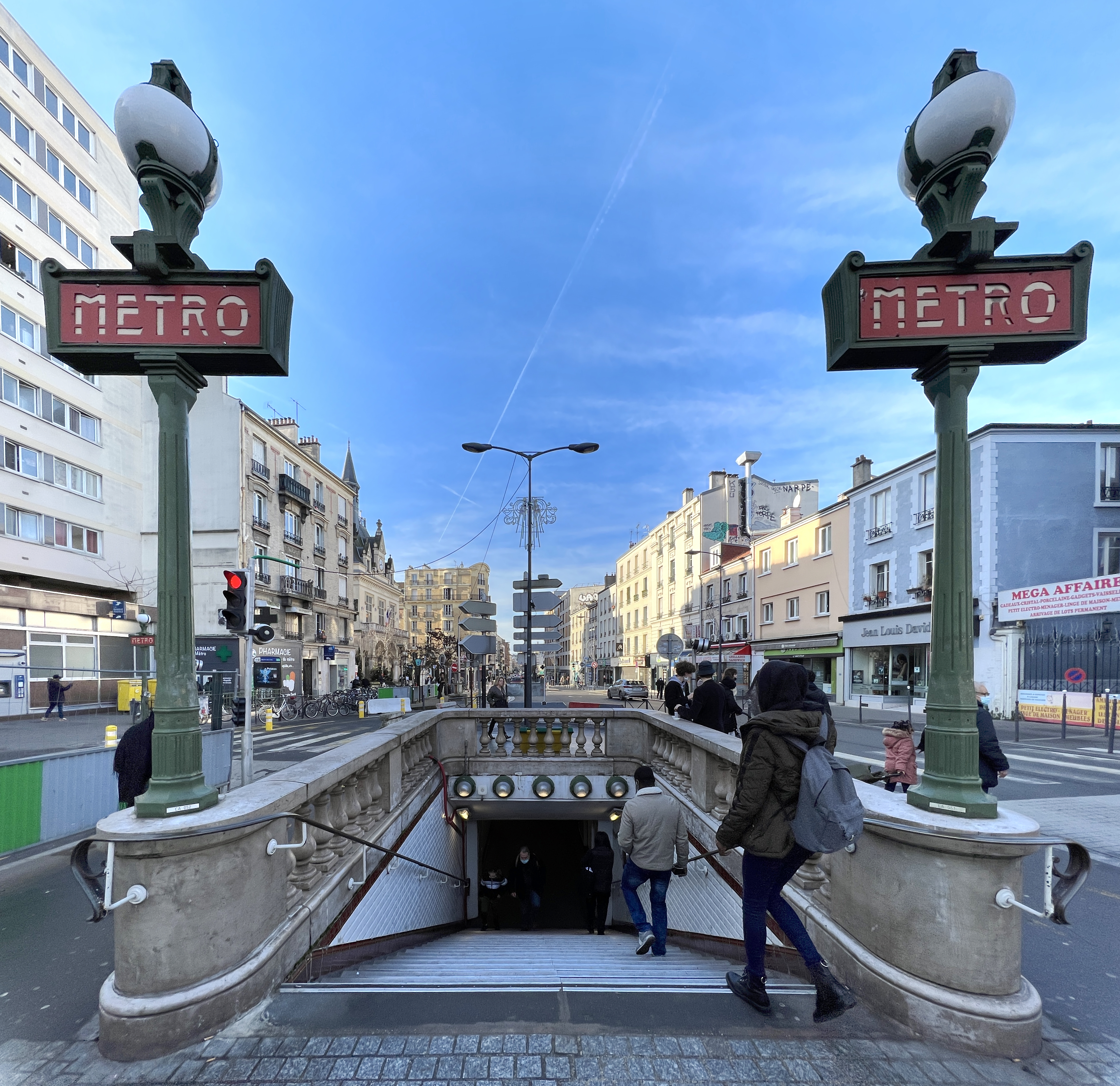
Entrance 1

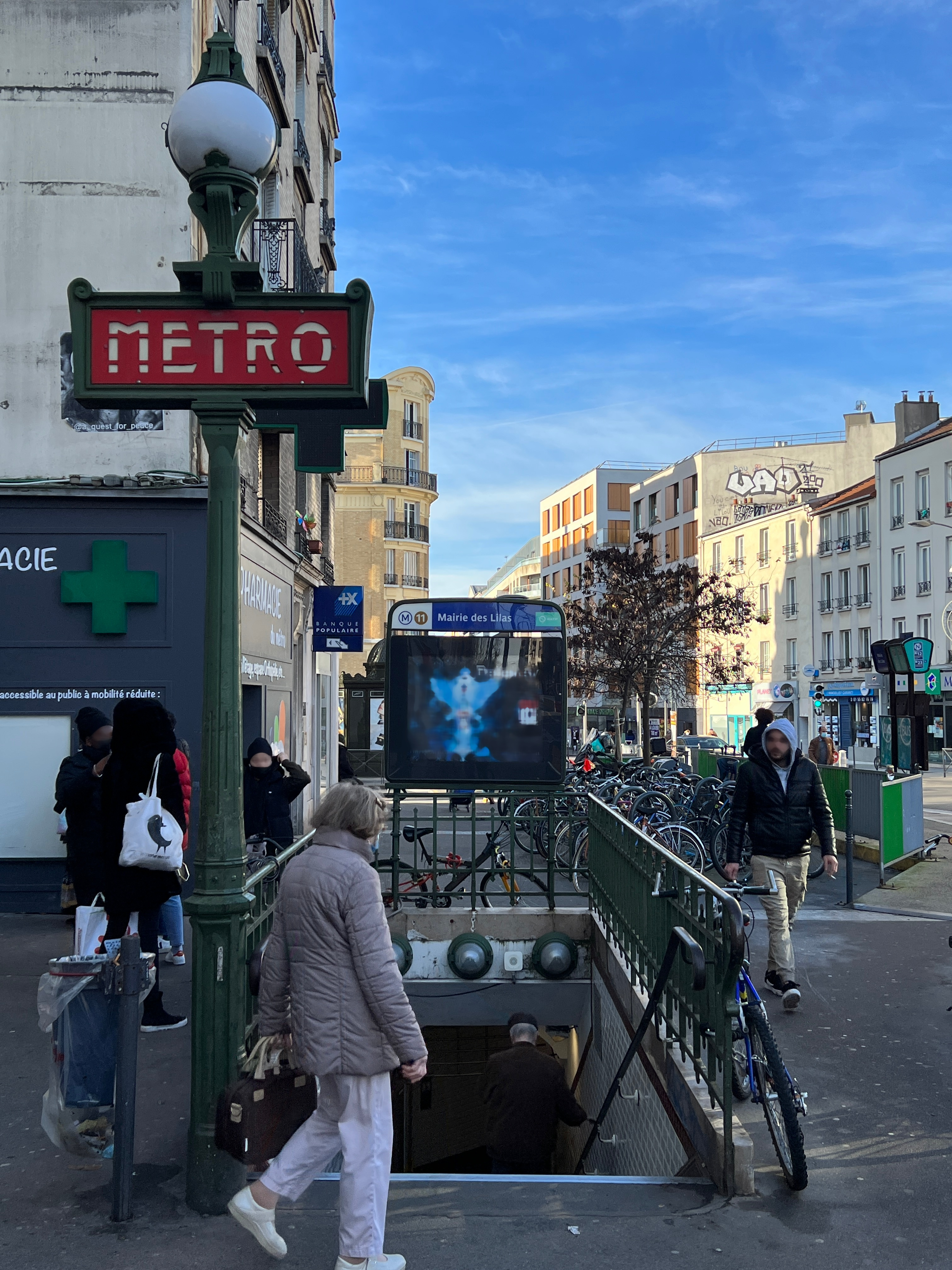
Entrance 2

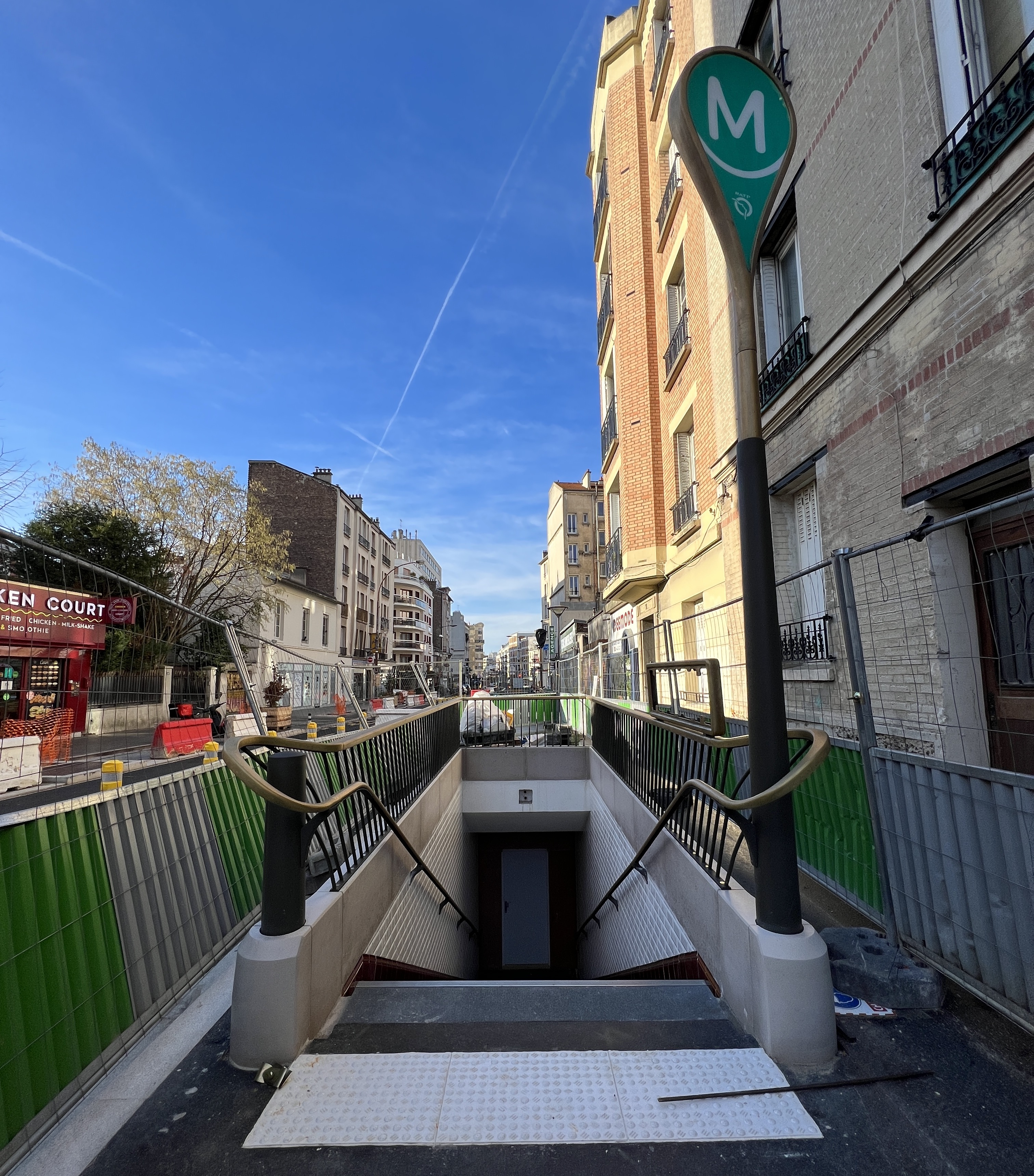
Construction of a new exit (2022)

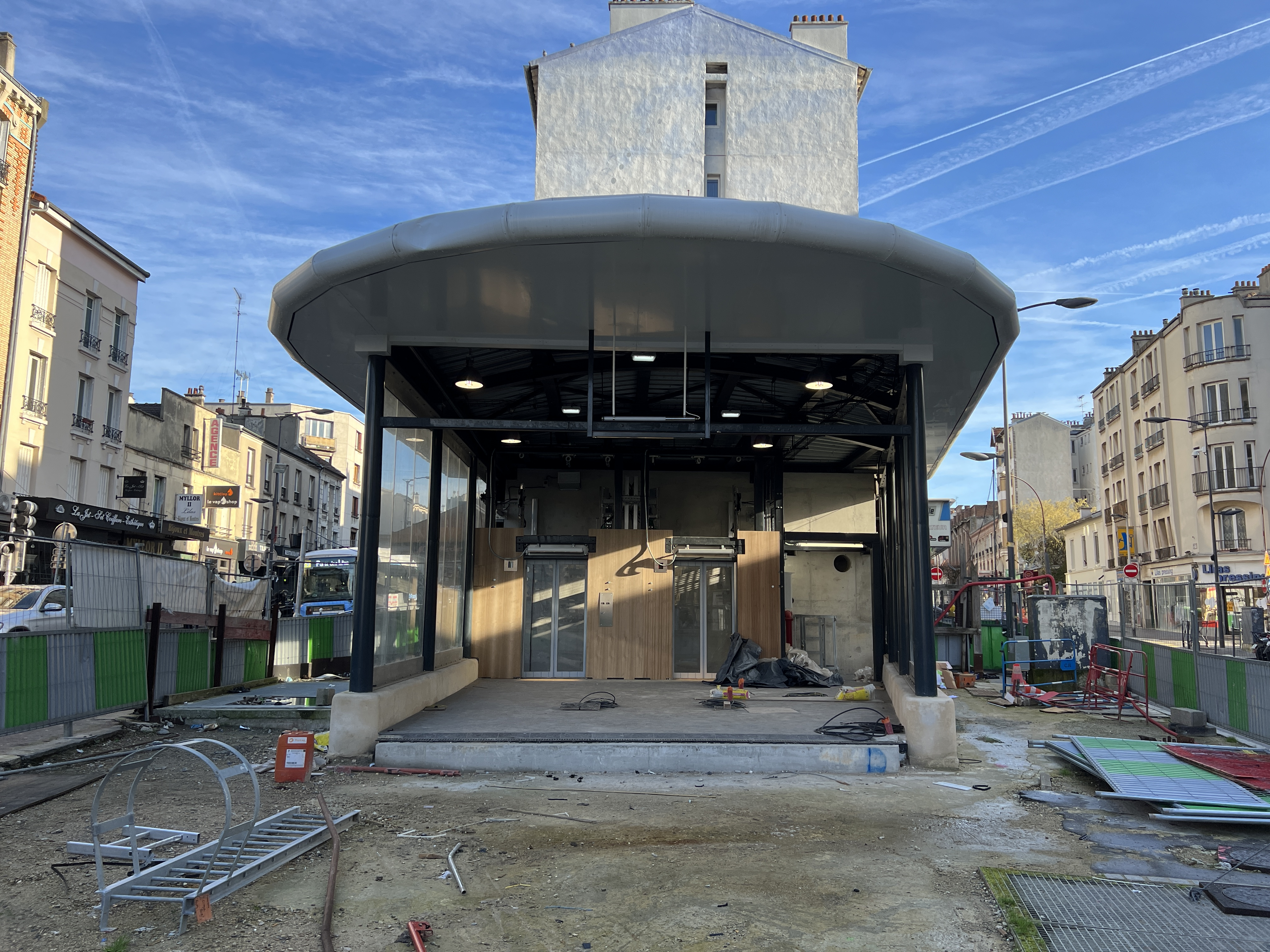
Construction of the new accessible entrance (2022)
