= Rosny–Bois-Perrier station =

Railway station in Rosny-sous-Bois, France

Rosny–Bois-Perrier
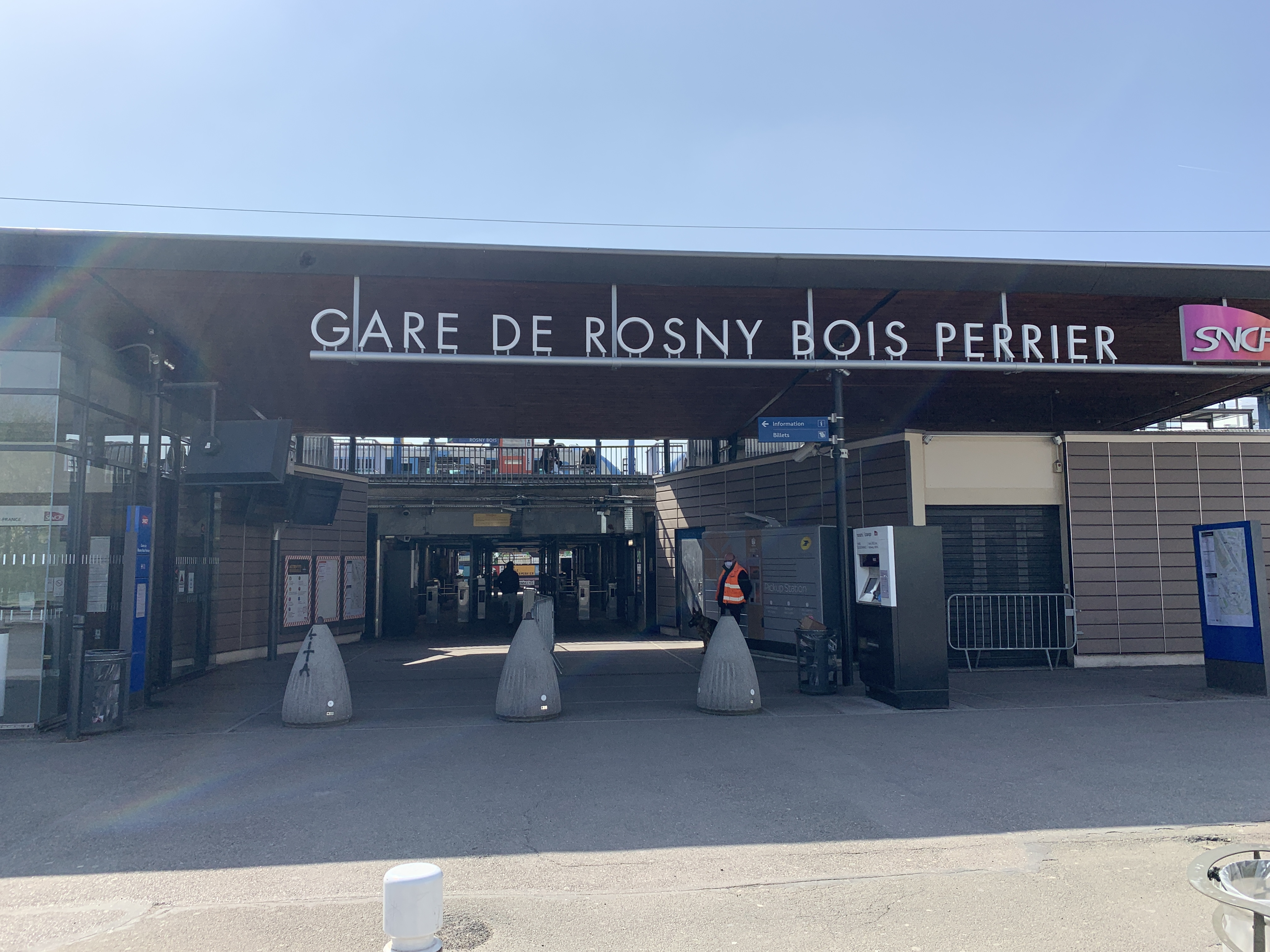
- RER E station entrance

General information
- Coordinates: 48°52′58″N 2°28′53″E
- Owner: SNCF
- Line: Paris-Est–Mulhouse-Ville railway
- Connections: RATP Bus: 102 116 121 143 145 221 245; Titus: 2; Noctilien: N142

Construction
- Accessible: Yes (Paris Metro Line 11); No (RER E)

Other information
- Station code: 87113696
- Fare zone: 3

History
- Opened: 1971
- Rebuilt: 2011

Passengers
- 2024: 6,274,844

Services
Preceding station	Paris Metro	Following station
Coteaux Beauclair towards Châtelet	Line 11	Terminus
Preceding station	RER	Following station
Noisy-le-Sec towards Nanterre–La Folie	RER E	Rosny-sous-Bois towards Tournan
Location

Rosny–Bois-Perrier station (French: Gare de Rosny–Bois-Perrier, pronounced [ʁoni bwa pɛʁje]) is a French metro and railway station in Rosny-sous-Bois, in the Seine-Saint-Denis department, in the Île-de-France region. It is named for and located in the Bois-Perrier district of Rosny it is located in, and serves the neighboring Rosny 2 mall, as well as the bus hub of the station.

== Location ==
The station is at kilometric point 11.216 of Paris–Mulhouse railway. Its altitude is 75 m.

== History ==
Rosny–Bois-Perrier station opened in 1971. Since 1999, it has been part of the RER network and served by trains going through the E4 branch connecting Paris to Villiers sur Marne, then to Tournan.

The building was demolished and rebuilt in 2010–2011.

== Service ==
=== Facilities ===
The counter in the building is open every day. The station is equipped with automatic ticket machines, real time traffic information systems and facilities for disabled people.

=== Train service ===
Rosny-Bois Perrier is served by RER E trains coming from or bound to Villiers-sur-Marne–Le Plessis-Trévise. Trains from or bound to Tournan call at the station only after 10 pm.

=== Bus Connections ===
The station is served by:

- RATP bus lines 102, 116, 121, 143, 145, 221, 245 and 346
- Noctilien night bus line N142
- Titus bus line 2

== Metro service ==
Rosny–Bois-Perrier became the new eastern terminus of Paris Metro Line 11 on 13 June 2024, following the opening of the line's extension from Mairie des Lilas. Upon opening, it became the easternmost station of the Paris Metro system.

Line 15 will eventually serve the station as well, as part of the Grand Paris Express project.

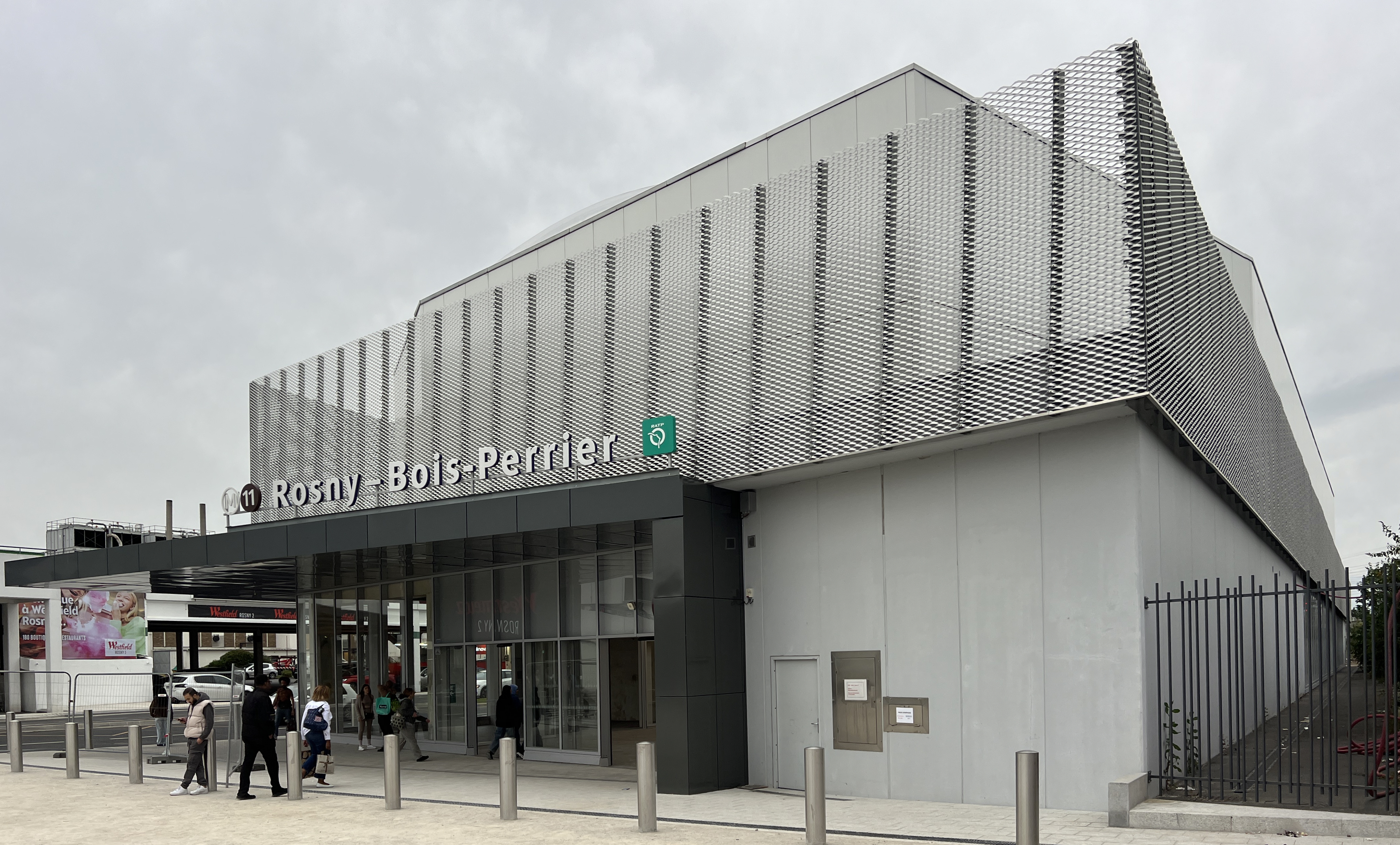
Paris Metro Line 11 station entrance on opening day

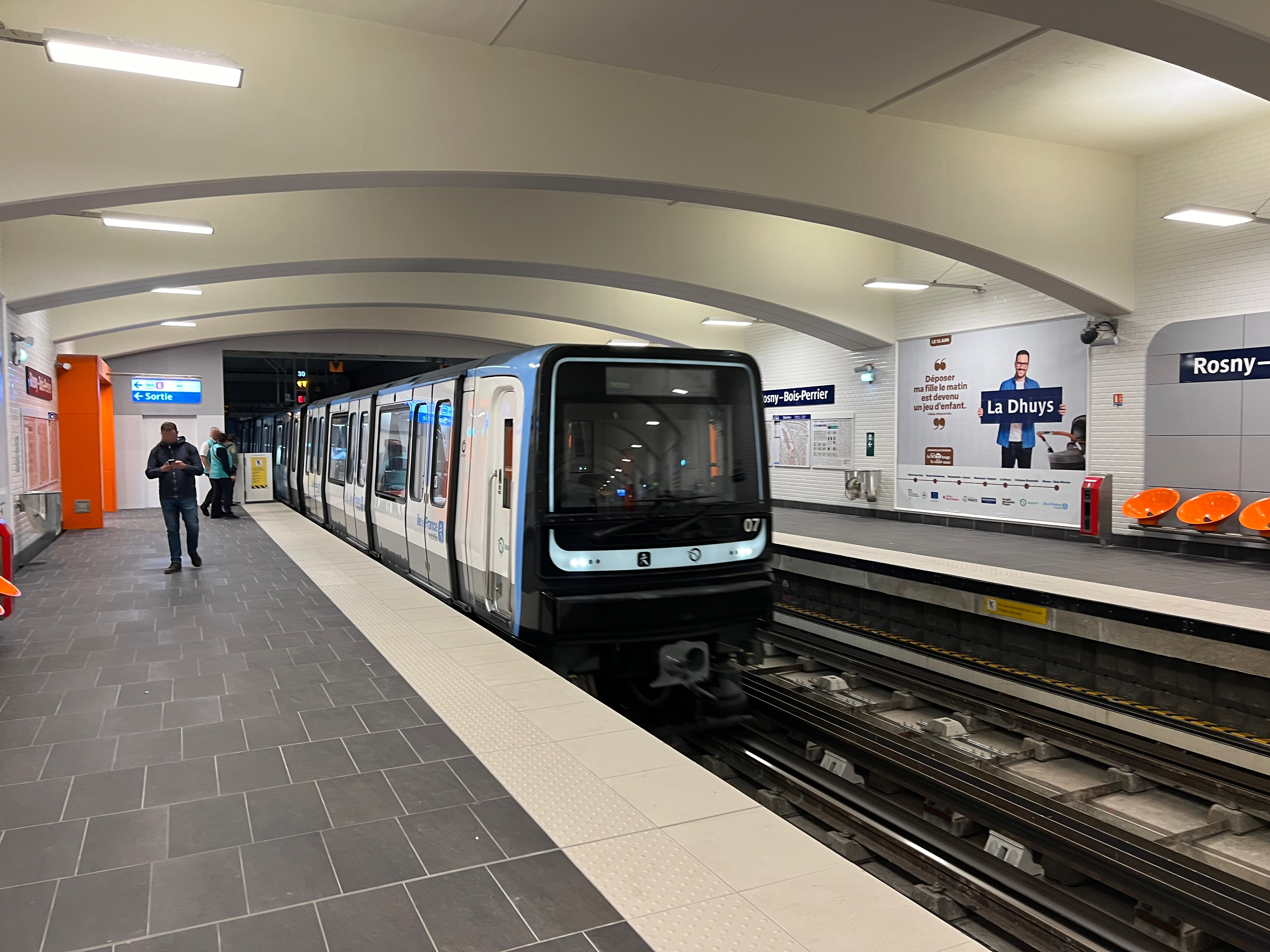
Metro platforms
