= MP 73 =

Paris Metro train

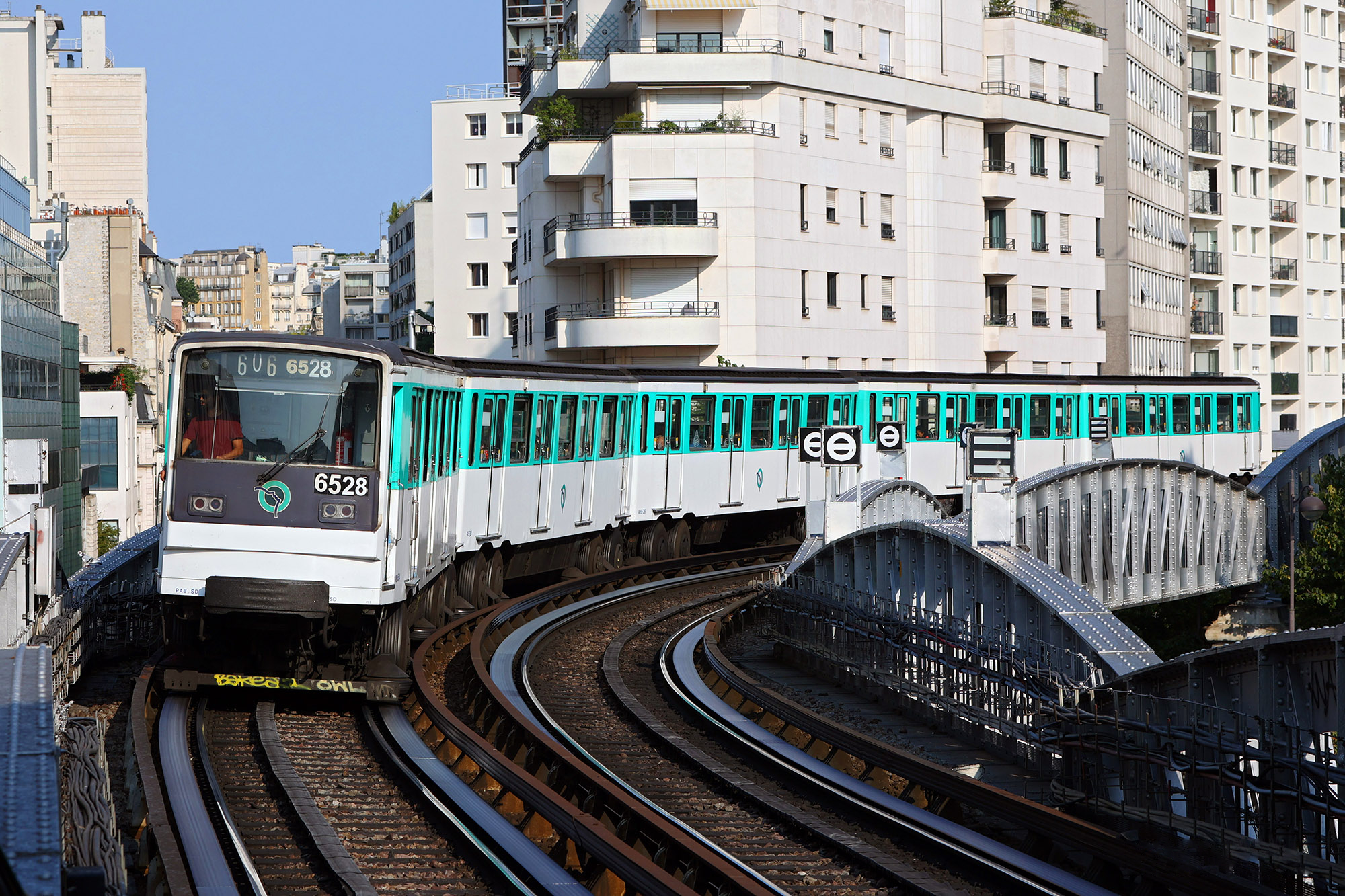
- MP 73 approaching Dupleix on an elevated section of Line 6

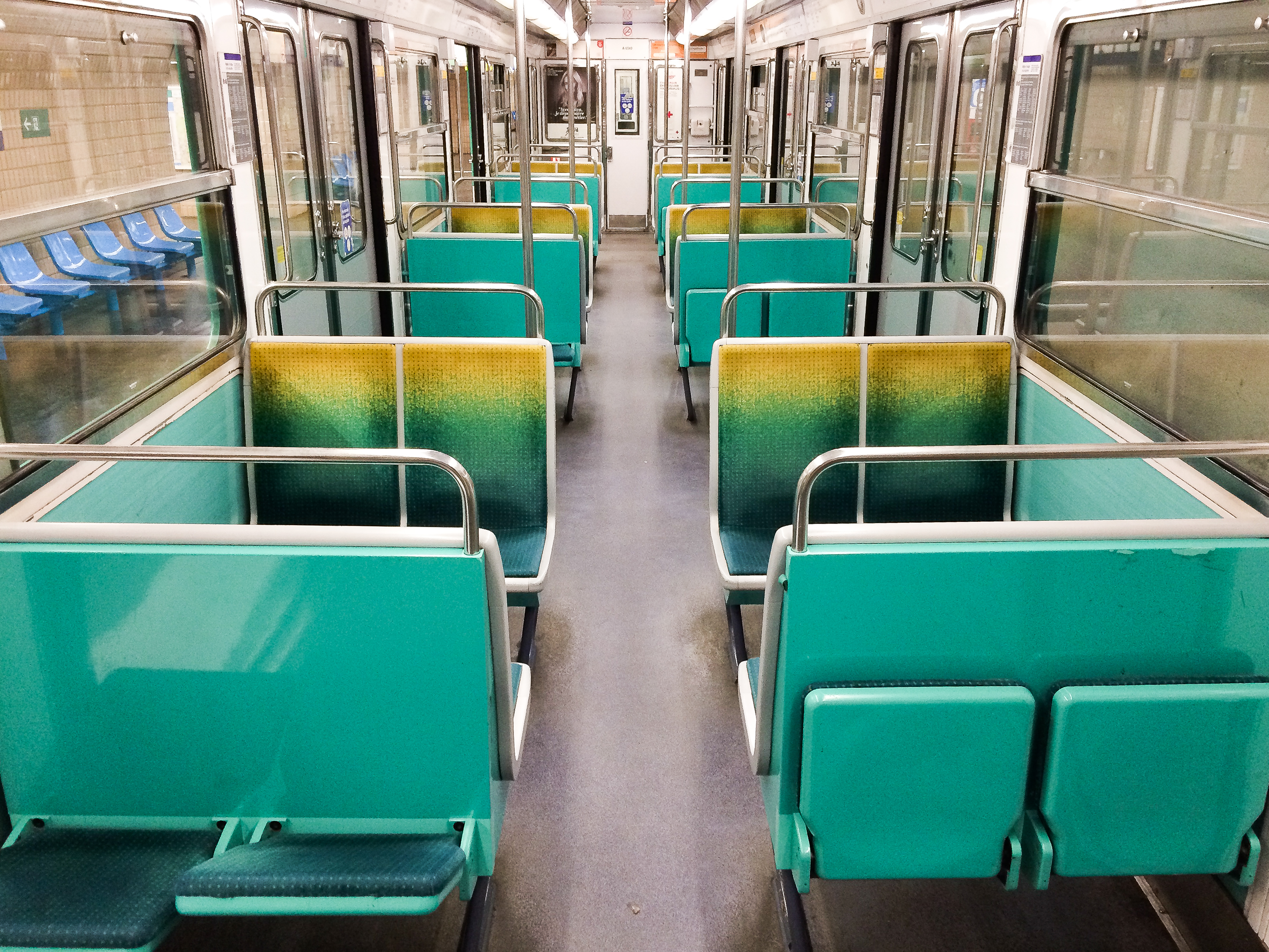
- Interior of the MP 73
- In service: 1974–2026
- Manufacturer: Alsthom
- Replaced: Sprague-Thomson
- Constructed: 1974
- Refurbished: 1998–2002
- Scrapped: 2021–2026
- Number built: 250 cars (50 trainsets)
- Successor: MP 89, MP 14
- Formation: 4 or 5 cars per trainset
- Operator: RATP
- Line served: Paris Metro Paris Metro Line 6

Specifications
- Train length: 4 cars: 60 m (196 ft 10 in); 5 cars: 75 m (246 ft 1 in)
- Car length: 15 m (49 ft 3 in)
- Width: 2.45 m (8 ft 0 in)
- Doors: 4 pairs per side, per car
- Maximum speed: 70 km/h (43 mph)
- Traction system: Resistor control with JH camshaft
- Traction motors: Alsthom Type MP4
- Power output: 1,320 kW (1,770 hp)
- Acceleration: 3.5 km/(h⋅s) (2.2 mph/s)
- Deceleration: 4.5 km/(h⋅s) (2.8 mph/s)
- Electric systems: Guide bar, 750 V DC
- Current collection: Contact shoes, side running on the vertical face of the guide bars
- Braking systems: Rheostatic, disc
- Track gauge: 1,435 mm (4 ft 8 1/2 in) standard gauge, with running pads for the rubber tired wheels outside of the steel rails

The MP 73 (French: Métro Pneu appel d'offres de 1973; English: Rubber-tyred metro ordered in 1973) was a rubber tired variant of electric multiple units used on the Paris Metro Line 6. Put into service in 1974, it is similar to the MP 59 performance-wise, with the appearance of the MF 67. It constitutes, after the MP 51, the MP 55, and the MP 59, the fourth Parisian generation of rubber-tired metros.

The MP 73 was replaced by the MP 89 on Line 6 between 2023 and 2026. Their final service before retirement occurred on 8 July 2026.

== History ==
Figure of the MP 73

After equipping Line 4 with rolling stock (MP 59), the RATP considered the conversion of iron lines to tires to be too long and costly to be completed within a timeframe compatible with the replacement of the oldest rolling stock. The RATP then developed modern iron-based units, the MF 67, in order to replace the life-expired Sprague-Thomson trainsets which were in urgent need of replacement. Line 6 was the exception to this, being converted to rubber tyre operation in 1974, some time after the main conversion project was canceled. This was due to a few reasons, mainly due to the bulk of the line being above ground and having unusually tight bends and therefore being especially loud and causing vibrations on steel-wheeled trains.

This new units, called MP 73, were visually identical to the earlier MF 67 but with the rubber tyres used on the MP 51, MP 55 and MP 59. Upon entering service, the units had a livery consisting of a bright blue body with a white stripe across the top half of the body, nicknamed "Roi Bleu" (Blue King). The interior was overall very light grey, however was later refurbished with blue, green and yellow interiors alongside the standard RATP livery on the outside.

The MP73 trains have five cars, two of which are motor cars with driver's cabins, one motor car without a cabin, and two standard passenger cars. The bogies are equipped with "ZZ" ribbed tires to improve grip on outdoor sections of the track in rainy weather.

The fifty MP 73 trainsets built in 1974 were put into service between 1 and 31 July 1974. They are particularly appreciated by local residents for their much lower noise levels than the old iron wheel trains they replace: According to the measurements taken on the viaducts during commissioning, at equal speed and at the height of the first floor of the buildings, the MP 73 reaches 67.5 dB(A) against 80 dB(A) for the Sprague-Thomson trains. Inside the trains, the noise measured also drops sharply, from 82 to 64 dB(A).

Until 1975, the MP 73s ran alongside the few remaining Sprague-Thomson trains on Line 6. Some MP 73 trains were transferred to reinforce line 4 (until 1979) and line 11 (until 1999).

- on line 4, they ran alongside the MP 59 rubber-tired trainsets and were lengthened to six cars like the MP 59s on this line from 1976 to 1979; Train 6550 (M3599-N4550-A6550-B7050-?-M3600) traveled on this line in the company of another MP 73 train, also with six cars;
- on line 11 in 1976 and 1978, they appeared with the MP 55, the first rubber-tired trains built between 1956 and 1958, and like the latter with four cars.

The MP 73 did not originally have glazing on interior doors and articulations. The glazing was put in place afterwards to reduce vandalism and improve durability.

=== Mid-life refurbishment ===
From 1996, the RATP undertook the renovation of the MP 73 trains. The first renovated train was 6529 (M.3557-B.7029-A.6529-N.4529-M.3558) in July 1996. This renovation involves the creation of a new black front like the renovated MP 59 and MF 67 of lines 3, 3bis and 9. It also contains the replacement of the leather seats by anti-laceration seats and new interior colors with a dominant green and yellow shading. Fluorescent lighting was also improved. The renovation of the entire series began in September 1998 after tests with the 6529 which served as a prototype for renovation. It was undertaken jointly by the RATP workshops in Fontenay-sous-Bois and Boissy-Saint-Léger as well as the Cannes La Bocca Industries workshops. The first refurbished trainset was brought back online in April 1999. The refurbishment program ended in 2002. In 2012, all the MP 73 trainsets in service were refurbished.

In 2017 and 2018, the MP73 was renewed again. On this occasion, the doors received a light gray coating on their interior side, thus losing their chrome appearance.

=== Retirement ===
The withdrawal of MP 73 began at the end of 2022, being replaced by the MP 89 CC trains which were transferred from Line 4 to Line 6 following the automation of Line 4.

The only MP 73 on line 11 (6544) was removed in July 2022, to be replaced by MP 14s.

The final MP 73 (6545) held its final service run on 8 July 2026, during which a ceremony was organised by the RATP.

== Technical characteristics ==
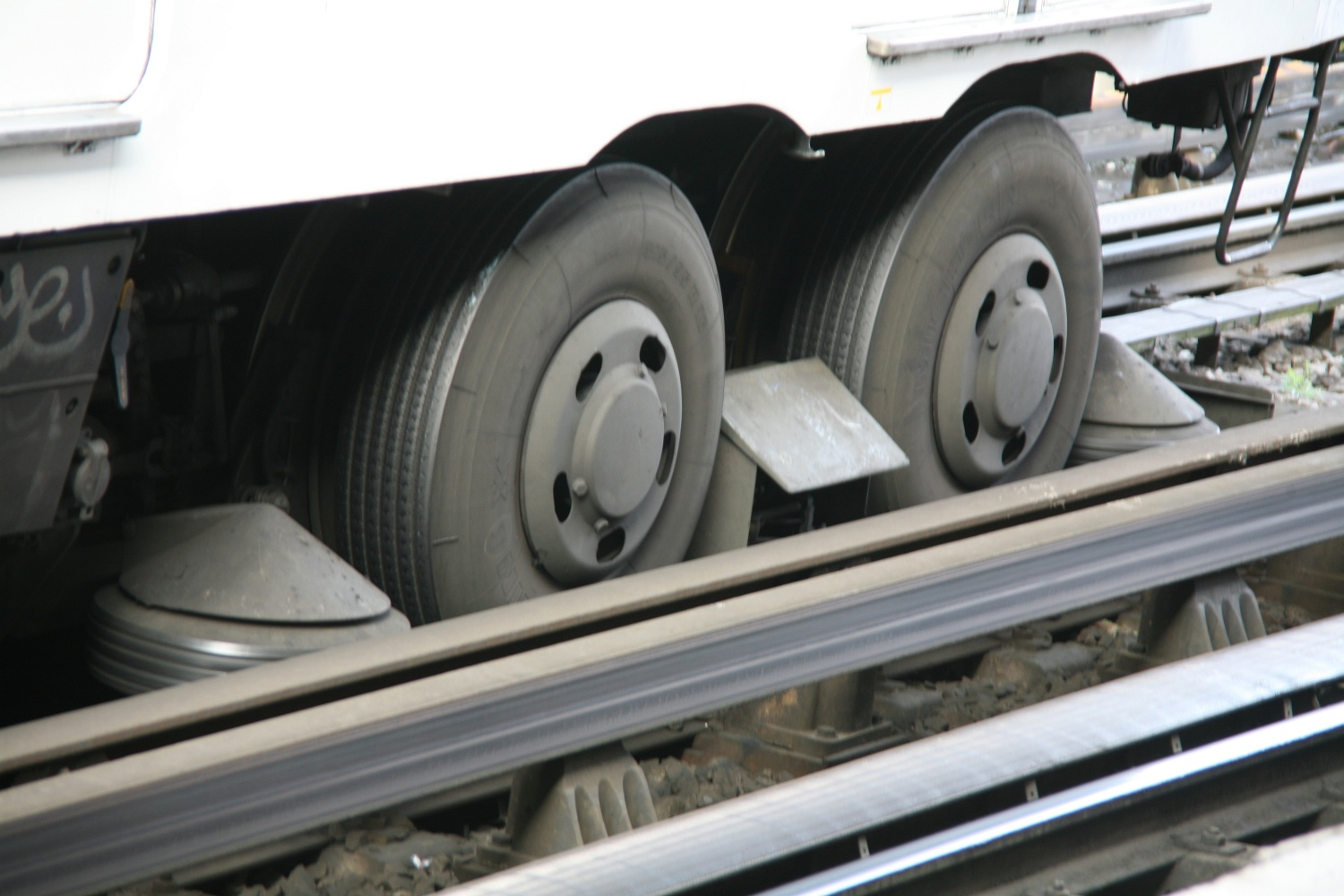
MP 73 Bogie

MP 73s were limited to 70 km/h (43 mph). Each power car was equipped with four 100 kW (130 hp) motors operating at 750 volts. They were controlled by a JH camshaft driven by a 72 V low voltage servo motor, with thirty notches. The low voltage of 72 V, also used for lighting, was supplied by a rotary converter. Braking had eleven notches on the manipulator, entirely pneumatic; it was controlled by a solenoid valve.

They had ribbed tires, lighter bodies, new aesthetics of the front end and more comfortable seats. They were equipped with the same motors (Type MP4) as the MP 68 of the Mexico City metro.

Due to steep gradients on the line, and very close stations, the trainsets kept a high M/T ratio to be able to obtain enough power in the climbs and powerful accelerations.

Like all metros with tires in Paris (except the MP 14), the brake shoes were made of wood.

== Other versions ==
The MP 86 was a test MP 73 with engines and suspensions from the MPM 76 of the Marseille metro which ran on line 11 of the Paris metro until at least 1999 in M-T-T-M composition.

The RATP does not wish to communicate on this prototype, and little information is available. Nevertheless, according to testimonies from people working at the workshop located in Châtelet, the MP 86 was equipped with Renault VI heavy truck drive axles and Faiveley wipers. These bogies were of the ANF brand; the traction motors were of the Alsthom MP 41 A type.

The composition of the MP 86 is also known and comes in the M-B-B-M form, i.e. two motor cars with cabin (M) and two type (B) trailers. One of the two trailers has automatic pilot equipment. The composition of the numbers was as follows, M n° 3599 & 3600, B n° 7006 & 7050. A photo of the MP 86 prototype can be seen in the book Le métro de Paris, by Gaston Jacobs (page 107), where the oar on the right of MP 55 #5513 is oar #7006, bearing the number of one of the trailers. It is no longer possible to find this train which has been deregistered. Only car B.7006 survives and circulates incorporated into train no. 6506.

=== Forked versions ===
Santiago Metro has a forked version named NS 74. The Mexico City Metro has another forked version named MP 82.
