= MP 55 =

Paris Metro train, 1956-1999

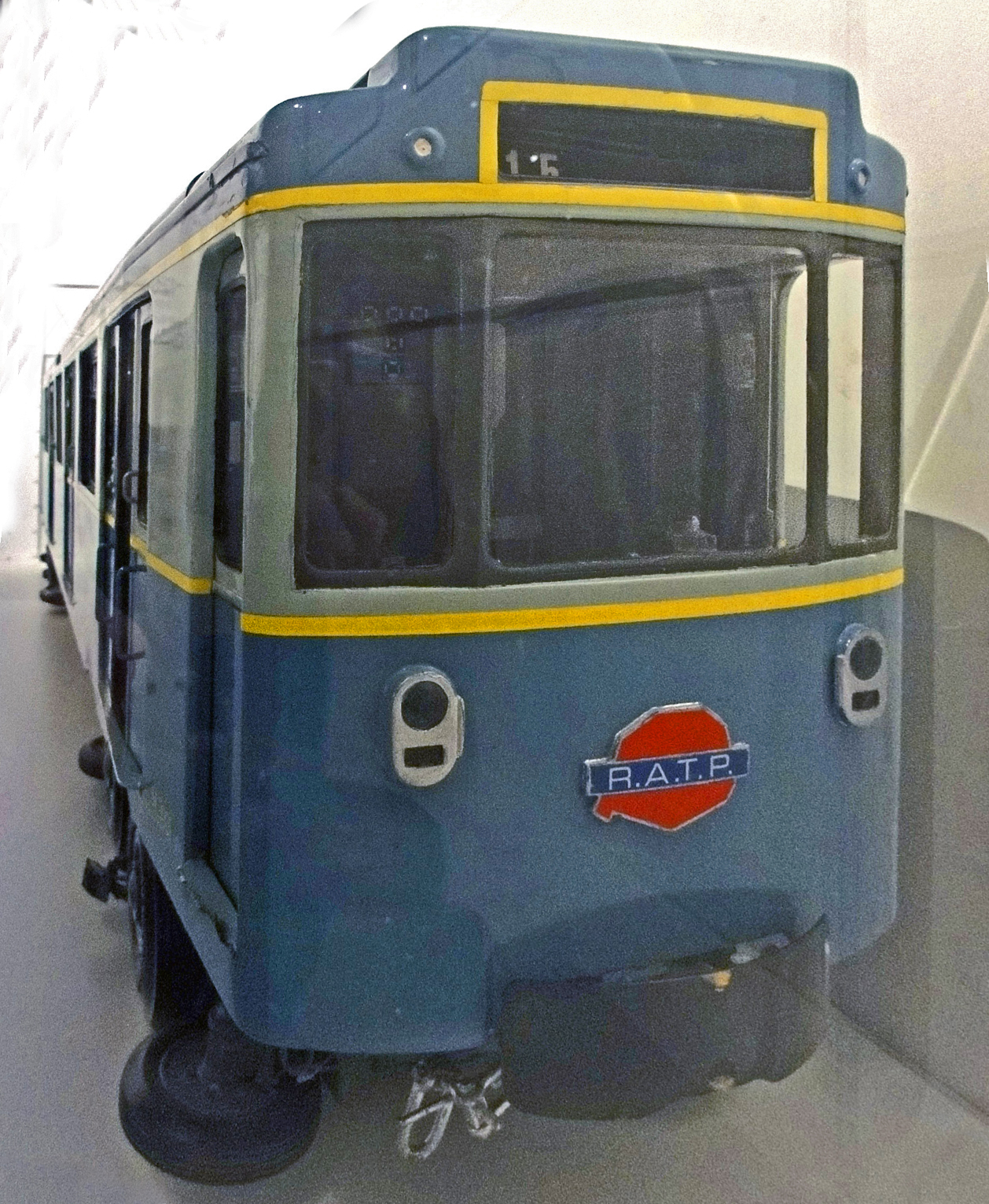
- Model of the MP 55
- In service: 1956–1999
- Manufacturer: GEC Alsthom
- Replaced: Sprague-Thomson
- Number built: 68 cars
- Successor: MP 59
- Formation: 4 per trainset
- Operator: RATP
- Line served: Paris Metro Paris Metro Line 11

Specifications
- Acceleration: 1.30 m/s^{2} (4.3 ft/s^{2})
- Electric system: 750 V DC Guide bars on either side of the track
- Current collection: Horizontal contact shoe A vertical contact shoe sliding on the rails provides grounding.
- Track gauge: 1,435 mm (4 ft 8 1/2 in), with running pads for the rubber tired wheels outside of the steel rails.

The MP 55 was the first generation of the rubber tired variant of electric multiple units used on the Paris Metro. The trains were manufactured by a consortium between Renault, Brissonneau et Lotz, and Alstom and operated on Line 11 from 1956 to 1999, when they were replaced by refurbished MP 59 stock from Line 4.

== Conception ==
After the successful testing of the MP 51 test car on the Navette, a segment of track linking lines 3bis and 7bis, the RATP decided to order 71 new train cars to equip Line 11, since the line contained a steep grade. The first train (M.3001-N.4001-AB.5501-M.3002) was delivered beginning on October 1, 1956, and went into service on November 8, 1956, with all 17 trains were in service by October 1957.

== Description ==
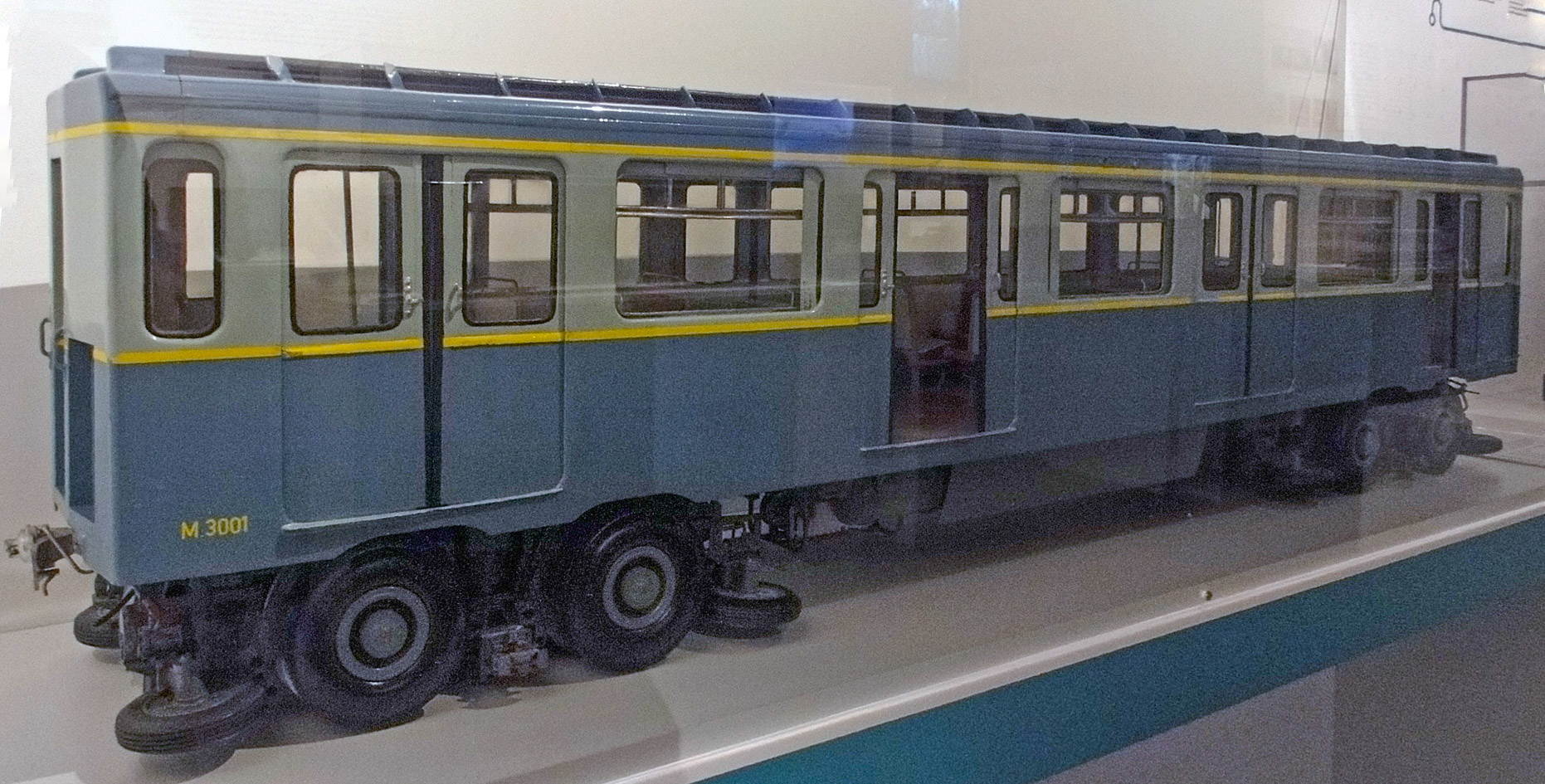
Side view of the MP 55 model

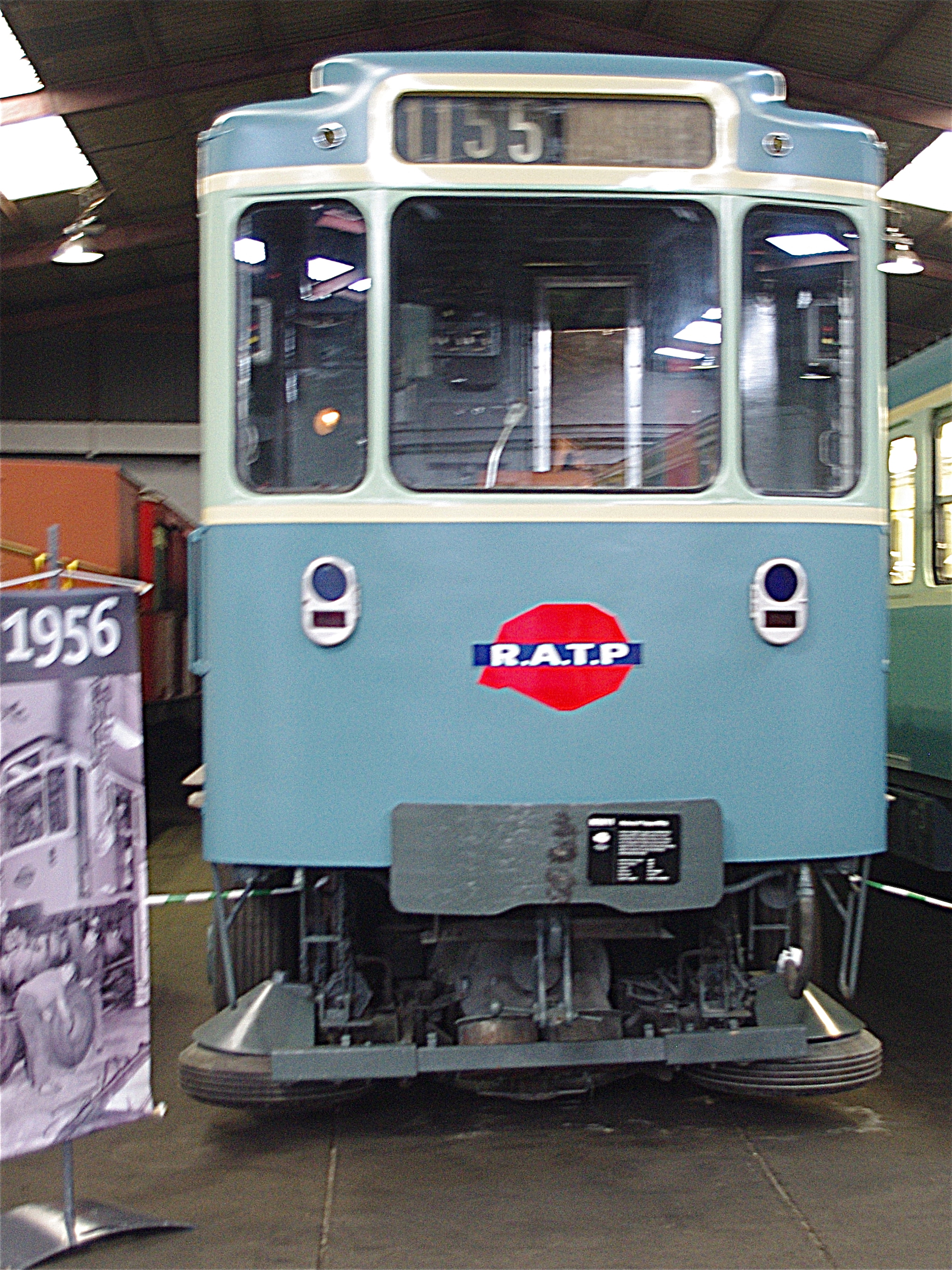
A preserved MP 55 car

The MP 55 was composed of 4 car trainsets, with three of the cars motorized. Originally, the trains were painted in a light blue livery and contained soft fluorescent lighting. Like many trains during the 1950s, the MP 55 trains contained both first class and second class cars.

The maximum acceleration for the MP 55 was restrained at 1.30 m/s^{2} (4.3 ft/s^{2}) for passenger comfort. The traction equipment used was either electro-pneumatic (EMC) or camshaft electric (Jeumon-Heidmann, or JH) and the braking system used was also of electro-pneumatic type, though a gradual variant was used. In 1967, automatic drive (ATO) was implemented on all trainsets.

== Refurbishment and retirement ==
In 1977, the trains underwent their mid-life refurbishment and received a darker blue livery similar to that of the MP 73. During the late 1980s, the RATP decided that it was time to retire the MP 55. Because of this, the trains were not repainted in the RATP's current mint green and white livery, however many trains were fitted with the RATP's current logo. The retirement process began in 1995, with the arrival of the newer MP 89 CC trains on Line 1, and refurbished MP 59 trainsets from Line 4 gradually replaced all of the MP 55 trainsets. The final train was retired on January 30, 1999, completing the retirement process.

Unlike the Sprague-Thomson, no MP 55 trainset was safeguarded in its entirety; nearly all of them were scrapped after their retirement. Only four cars were preserved, however: two by the RATP (AB.5517 and M.3011), one by Renault (M.3001), and the fourth by a private museum (M.3030).
