= MP 14 (Paris Metro) =

Paris Metro train

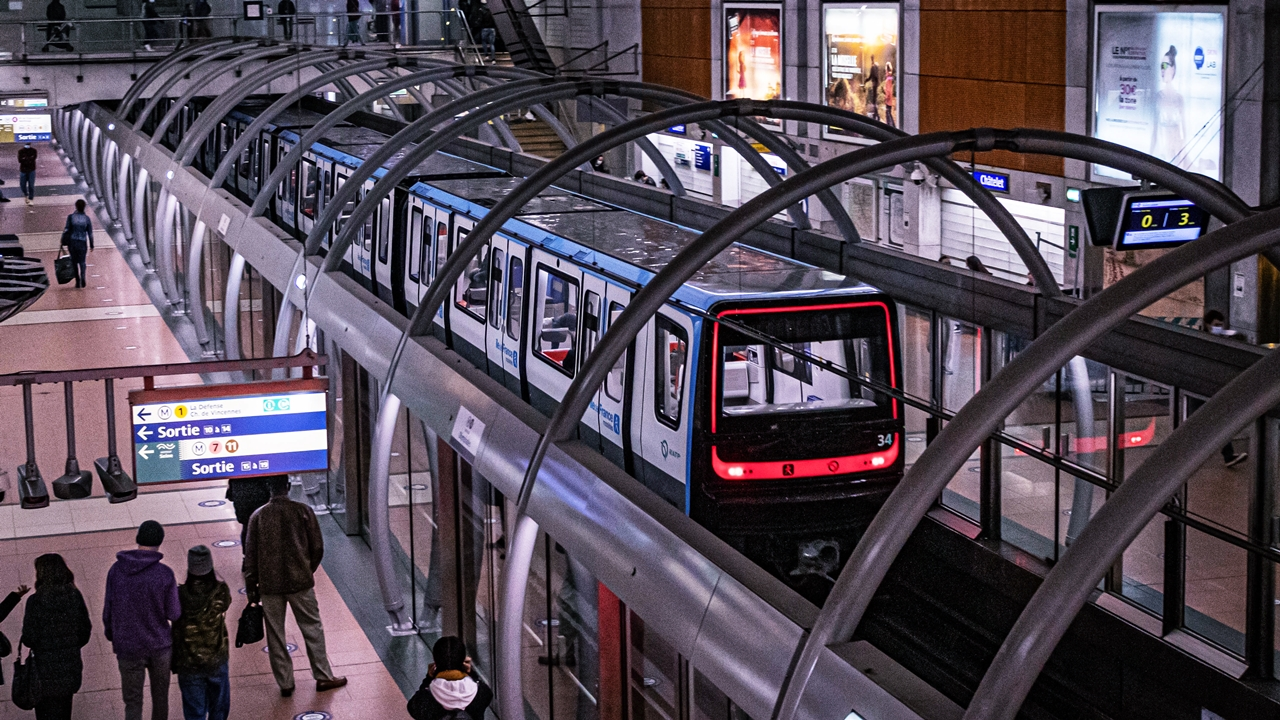
- MP 14 train at Châtelet on Line 14

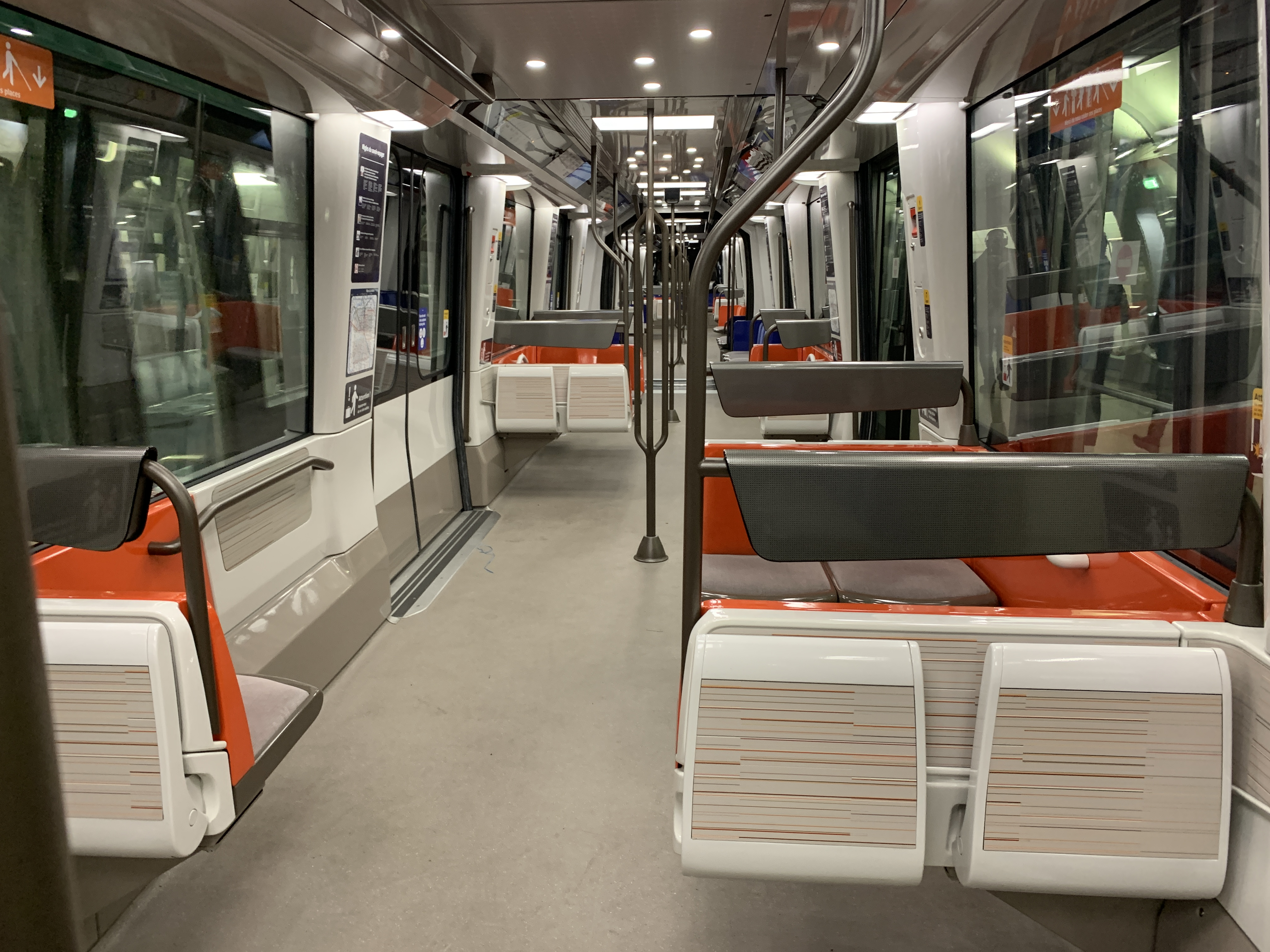
- Interior of MP 14 train
- In service: 12 October 2020−present
- Manufacturer: Alstom
- Family name: Metropolis
- Replaced: MP 59, MP 73
- Constructed: 2020−present
- Number built: 109 trainsets (107 in service)
- Formation: Line 4: 6 cars per trainset; Line 11: 5 cars per trainset; Line 14: 8 cars per trainset
- Capacity: 932 per train (8 cars set)
- Operator: RATP
- Depots: Saint-Ouen (Lines 4 & 14); Morangis (Line 14); Rosny (Line 11)
- Line served: Paris Metro Paris Metro Line 4 Paris Metro Line 11 Paris Metro Line 14

Specifications
- Car body construction: Aluminium
- Train length: 8-car set: 120 m (393 ft 8 in); 6-car set: 90 m (295 ft 3 in); 5-car set: 75 m (246 ft 1 in)
- Car length: 15.04 m (49 ft 4 in)
- Width: 2.45 m (8.0 ft)
- Doors: 3 per side, per car
- Maximum speed: Design: 100 km/h (62 mph); Service: 80 km/h (50 mph)
- Traction system: Alstom OniX 572 HP2-AM IGBT-VVVF
- Traction motors: Alstom 6ELA (squirrel-cage induction)
- Power output: 8-car set: 3,200 kW (4,300 hp); 6-car set: 2,560 kW (3,430 hp); 5-car set: 1,920 kW (2,570 hp)
- Acceleration: 4.86 km/(h⋅s) (3.02 mph/s) max.
- Deceleration: 5 km/(h⋅s) (3.1 mph/s) (emergency brake)
- HVAC: Air conditioning
- Electric systems: Guide bar, 750 V DC
- Current collection: Contact shoes, side running on the vertical face of the guide bars
- UIC classification: 8-car set: 2′2′+B′B′+B′B′+2′2′+B′B′+B′B+B′B′+2′2′; 6-car set: 2′2′+B′B′+B′B′+B′B′+B′B′+2′2′; 5-car set: 2′2′+B′B′+B′B′+B′B′+2′2′
- Bogies: Type CL449
- Braking systems: Electrodynamic, regenerative, disc
- Safety systems: SAET (Line 4 and 14), OCTYS (Line 11)
- Coupling system: Scharfenberg type
- Track gauge: 1,435 mm (4 ft 8 1/2 in) standard gauge, with running pads for the rubber tired wheels outside of the steel rails

The MP 14 (French: Métro Pneu appel d'offres de 2014; English: Rubber-tyred metro ordered in 2014) is a rubber-tyred electric multiple unit for the Paris Metro. Manufactured by Alstom as part of the Alstom Metropolis family of units, it is the seventh generation of the rubber-tyred class of trains to be used on the system and is used on Line 4, Line 11 and Line 14. In the future, trains could be ordered for Line 1 and Line 6.

The automated (driverless) version of MP 14 started entering service on Line 14 in 2020, and on Line 4 in 2022, and a manually operated version started entering service on Line 11 in June 2023. The roll-out of the MP 14 is causing a significant reshuffle of the Metro's rubber-tyred fleet. The Paris Metro will then redeploy their MP 89 CA (MP 89–6) and 11 MP 05 trains from Line 14 to Line 4, and redeploy their MP 89 CC (MP 89–5) trains from Line 4 on Line 6, and withdraw all remaining MP 59 and MP 73 trains from use on Line 11 and Line 6, respectively.

== Background ==
Recent changes in government regulations regarding rail transport (ORTF Law of 8 December 2009) now require that the STIF contribute 50% of funding for replacement rolling stock (as seen with the MF 01 purchase for Line 9), and 100% of funding for rolling stock for new lines and extensions (as seen with the MP 05 purchase for Line 14). As a result, the STIF began compiling a master plan to analyze how to replace existing rolling stock with a new stock that can meet the needs of the growing Metro network. The results of the findings justified the need for a brand new series of rubber-tyred rolling stock.

The new rolling stock will increase capacity on some lines and replace older rolling stock on other lines. In 2012, STIF identified the need to expand capacity on Line 14, due to the planned simultaneous extensions north to Saint-Denis–Pleyel and south to Aéroport d'Orly. Therefore, the STIF deemed it urgent to extend the train-sets from six to eight cars, something that was not fully realised on the Metro prior to the construction of Line 14 (all of the existing stations on the line are capable of handling eight-car train formations). The STIF also identified the need to replace the ageing MP 59 stock on Line 11 and the MP 73 stock on Line 6, both of which were predicted to reach the end of their useful lives by around 2020.

=== Orders ===
In January 2015, RATP awarded the framework contract for the MP 14 trains to Alstom at an overall cost of €2 billion. An initial order of 35 eight-car fully automated trains for Line 14 was confirmed with a cost of around €500m. Further batches have subsequently been ordered - 20 six-car fully automated trains for Line 4 ordered in December 2016 at a cost of €163m, 20 five-car manually-driven trains for Line 11 ordered in February 2018 at a cost of €157m, and an additional 19 trains for Line 11 ordered in July 2021.

=== Deliveries ===
In 2019, the first MP 14 was delivered to the RATP. It was first tested on Line 1, as the northern section and new workshop of Line 14 had not been completed. Tests including emergency braking, stopping in front of platform screen doors, as well as general endurance testing were undertaken at night while Line 1 was closed. After around a year, the train returned to Alstom to be fitted out for passenger service.

==== Line 14 ====
In June 2020, the first production MP 14 arrived on line 14. It was tested for 3 months with agents on board, and was introduced into passenger service in October 2020. Since that date approximately, 2 trains have been delivered per month by Alstom, where they remain for 2 weeks in final tests, then are introduced into passenger service on the line. Unlike the MP 89 CA and MP 05, MP 14 trains are 8 cars in length (MP 14–8), and therefore the introduction of them into passenger service greatly increases capacity on Line 14.

==== Line 4 ====
In 2019, a test train was delivered to carry out tests on Line 4 at night and on Sunday mornings. A second joined it in March 2022. The MP 14 trains entered passenger service when the line began operating in full automation (injection of automatic trains into manual traffic) on 13 September 2022. The remaining 18 MP14s were delivered between June 2023 and January 2024. MP 14 trains on Line 4 are 6 cars in length (MP 14–6).

==== Line 11 ====
Line 11 received an MP 14 in October 2021, which was initially used for testing of the extension to Rosny–Bois-Perrier. MP 14 trains on Line 11 are 5 cars in length (MP 14–5), and unlike other MP 14 trains, they will be operated manually.

In October 2022 the online tests, with 4 trains, were extended to the elevated section of the extension. The trains are loaded with ballast, to simulate the presence of passengers, and have thus circulated at different speeds to check the good behavior of the viaduct.

Driving training for drivers was begun in January 2023. The installation of trains on Line 11 is as of May 2023, completed. The first trains entered commercial service on 1 June 2023. Before mid-July, all 18 MP 14 will be in service on the line, entering service at a rate of 4 per week.

== Description ==
Like the preceding MP 89, this new class of rubber-tyred rolling stock will be divided into two subclasses:

- A fully automated (CA) class, with eight cars per train (MP 14–8), operating on Line 14. A six car CA variant (MP 14–6) entered service on Line 4, after the line was retrofitted for automatic operations.
- A manually-driven (CC) class, with five cars per train (MP 14–5), to replace the MP 59 stock on Line 11.

=== Exterior ===
The train looks very different from the previous generations MP 89 and MP 05 with their pointed noses (designed by Roger Tallon, creator of the TGV design among others). The front of the train has a flat face, with a LED strip. The body is curved like the MF 77 stock in order to save some space. The windows no longer have perfectly rectangular glass surfaces, but now have rounded corners.

The MP 14s wear the Île-de-France Mobilités livery (featuring white with grey accents and light blue stripes), replacing the RATP jade green livery used on older models.

On the manually-driven MP 14's on Line 11, the end window was replaced with a cabin access door.

Audio of the departure of an MP14-8

Sound of full speed and electric braking on an MP14-8

Sound of electric braking on an MP14-8 (first setting)

=== Interior ===
Inside the train, the predominant colour is white with gray-beige at lower levels. The seats are blue, with red for the reserved places. Their arrangement is transverse 2 + 1/2 + 0, with spaces for suitcases and baggage. Space for wheelchairs are also located throughout the train.

The lighting is exclusively LED, including the vertical strips along the columns near the doors which turn orange when doors are closing (accompanied by a loud audio cue).

Passenger information is provided by AVSA (Annonces Visuelles et Sonores Automatiques), with an illuminated line plan above the doors, as well as audible announcements. There are also LCD screens which display the next stop, connections, the destination of the train, the geographic route of the line and — when approaching the station — the plan of the platforms and exits in relation to its position in the train, similar to displays in Japan.

Trains are equipped with full air conditioning to maintain a pleasant temperature, and therefore the windows cannot be opened.

=== Technical characteristics ===
The MP 14, like its predecessors, uses the CL449 type bogie with iron wheels and tires. They are designed for use at 80 km/h in normal service. These are mono-motor bogies, whose engine is in the central position, and in the axis. It is equipped with two suspensions: rubber spring for the primary, and pneumatic spring for the secondary, allowing significant comfort. The MP 14 trains are 20% more energy efficient than the previous generation of rubber-tyred trains - the MP 05.

The power control system is an OniX 572 type inverter using IGBT components manufactured by Alstom. All traction, motors and inverters, is supervised by AGATE (Advanced Gec Alstom Traction Electronic).

== Orders ==
Type	Number of trains ordered	Number of trains in the batch	Batch status	Line(s)	Notes
CA 8 cars (MP14-8)	72	35 – 72 trains	Confirmed batch	Paris Metro Paris Metro Line 14	35 trains ordered on 30 January 2015, then 37 others announced in October 2020.; Replacements for the MP 89 CA and MP 05 of Line 14, which are moving to Line 4; supplying rolling stock for the extensions to the north towards Saint-Denis–Pleyel & to the south towards Aéroport d'Orly, and allowing Line 14 to run 8-car trains.; First train arrived around the end of December 2018 and presented on 13 February 2019; entered service on 12 October 2020
CA 8 cars (MP14-8)	3	1 – 15 trains	Conditional batch (TC1)	Paris Metro Paris Metro Line 14	3 trains ordered on 24 July 2024.; Possible option orders due to the various extensions of the line to the north and south.
CA 6 cars (MP14-6)	24	20 – 50 trains	Confirmed batch (ex-Conditional batch (TC2))	Paris Metro Paris Metro Line 4	20 trains ordered on 6 December 2016.; Replacements for the MP 89 CC of Line 4, which are moving to Line 6 due to the automation of Line 4 (thereby replacing MP 73); supplying rolling stock for the extension to Bagneux–Lucie Aubrac.; 4 trains ordered on 24 July 2024.; First train arrived around the end of September 2019; entered service on 15 September 2022.
CC 5 cars (MP14-5)	39	10 – 80 trains	Confirmed batch (ex-Conditional batch (TC3))	Paris Metro Paris Metro Line 11	20 trains ordered on 14 December 2017.; To replace the MP 59 from 2022, and supply rolling stock for the extension to the east towards Rosny–Bois-Perrier.; 19 trains ordered in July 2021.; The first train was presented at the beginning of October 2021 and arrived in April 2022; entered service on 1 June 2023.
Total	138				

== Formations ==
=== Line 4 ===
uses driverless trains in a 6-car formation, MP 14–6 (4M2T) . The extension to Bagneux–Lucie Aubrac was opened in 2022, and, as of March 2022, the automation of the line was completed by the end of 2023.

As of 4 December 2024, 20 6-car sets are allocated to Saint-Ouen depot for use on Line 4.

	<- P^{te} de Clignancourt Bagneux ->					
Car No.	1	2	3	4	5	6
Type	T	M	M	M	M	T
Designation	S1.VB-12xx	N1.VB-12xx	N.VB-12xx	N2.VB-12xx	N1.VB-12xx	S2.VB-12xx

=== Line 11 ===
uses manually driven trains in a 5-car formation, MP 14–5 (3M2T) (unlike the current 4-car MP 59s).

As of 4 December 2024, 33 5-car sets are allocated to Rosny depot for use on Line 11.

	<- Châtelet Rosny-sous-Bois ->				
Car No.	1	2	3	4	5
Type	T	M	M	M	T
Designation	S1.VC-14xx	N1.VC-14xx	N2.VC-14xx	N1.VC-14xx	S2.VC-14xx

=== Line 14 ===
uses driverless trains in an 8-car formation, MP14–8 (5M3T). Line 14 was the first line to receive the MP 14.

As of 4 December 2024, 66 8-car sets are allocated to Saint-Ouen and Morangis depots for use on Line 14.

	<- Saint-Denis Aéroport d'Orly ->							
Car No.	1	2	3	4	5	6	7	8
Type	T	M	M	T	M	M	M	T
Designation	S1.VA-10xx	N1.VA-10xx	N.VA-10xx	B.VA-10xx	N3.VA-10xx	N2.VA-10xx	N1.VA-10xx	S2.VA-10xx

- "M" motorized car
- "T" Trailer car

== Gallery ==
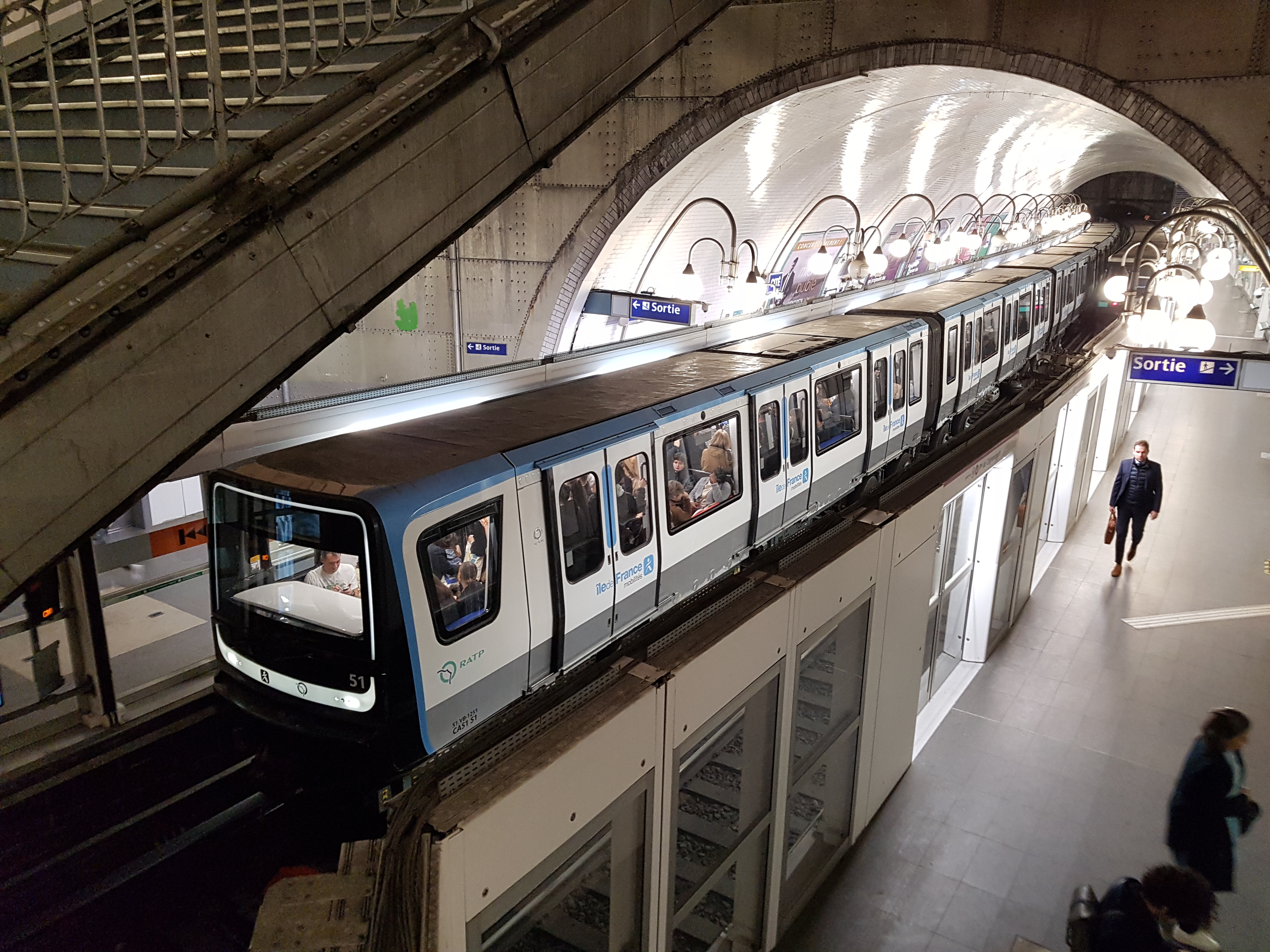
MP 14 CA at Cité station on Line 4

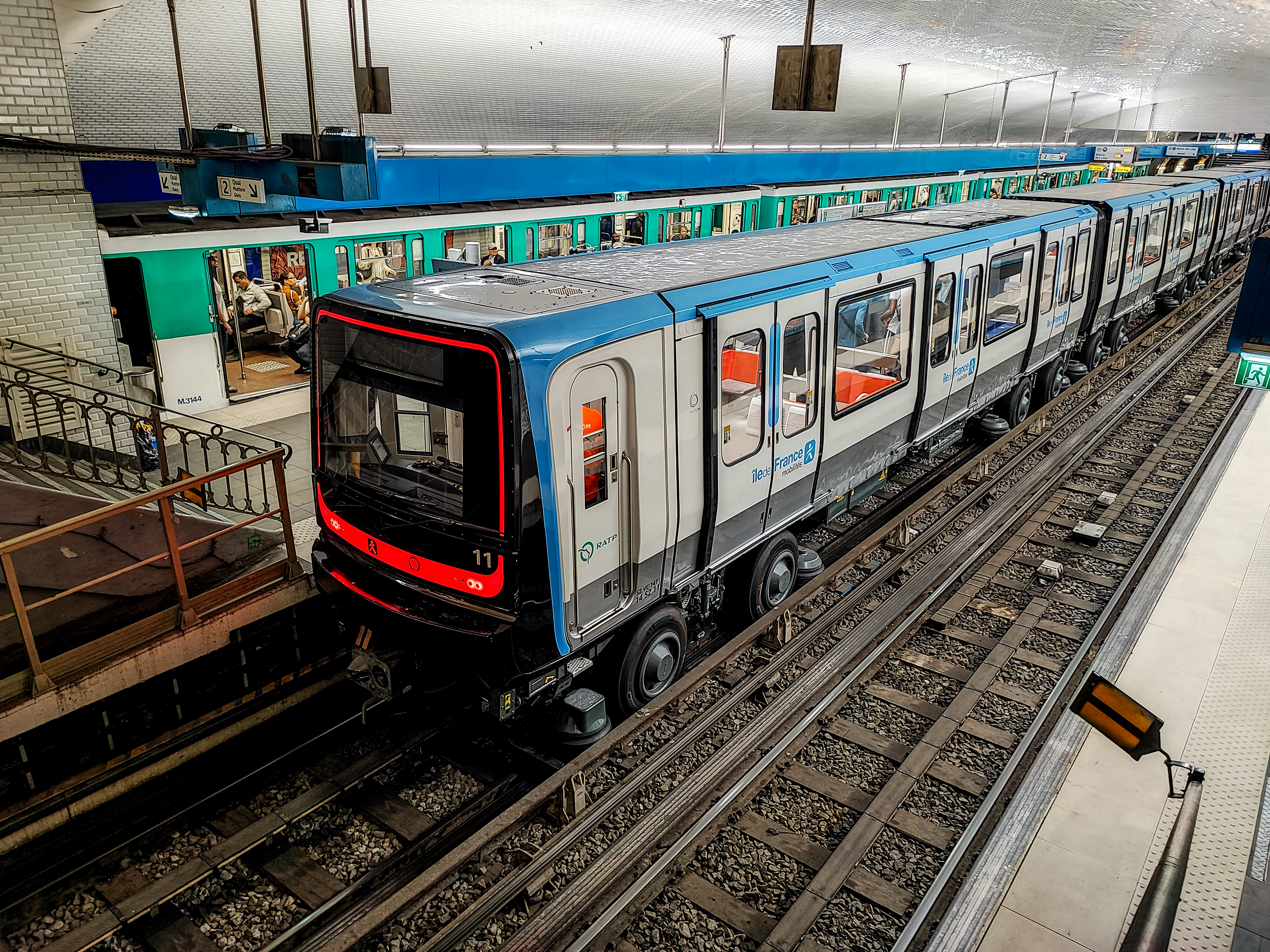
MP 14 CC at Châtelet station on Line 11

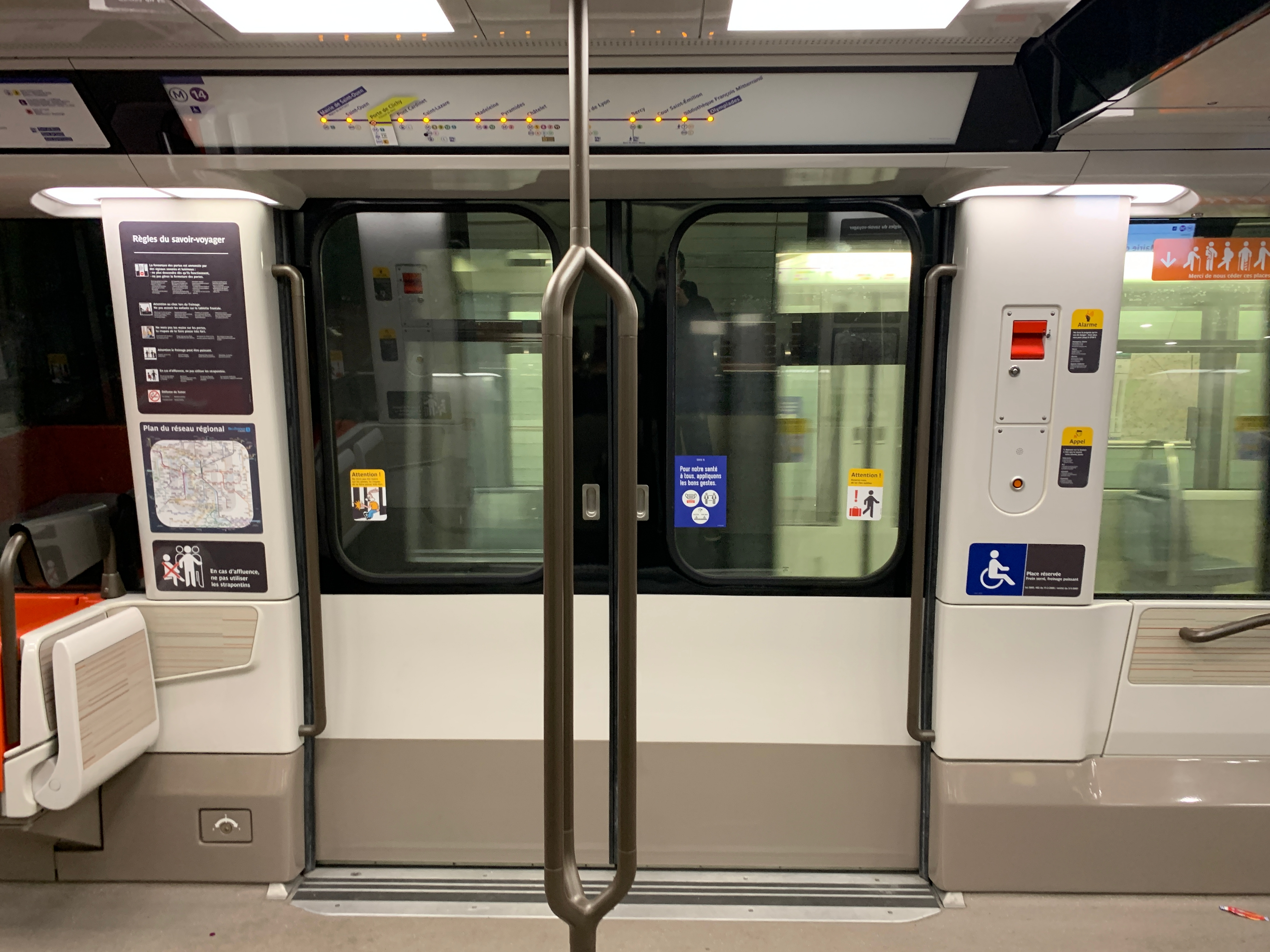
AVSA system for the line plan

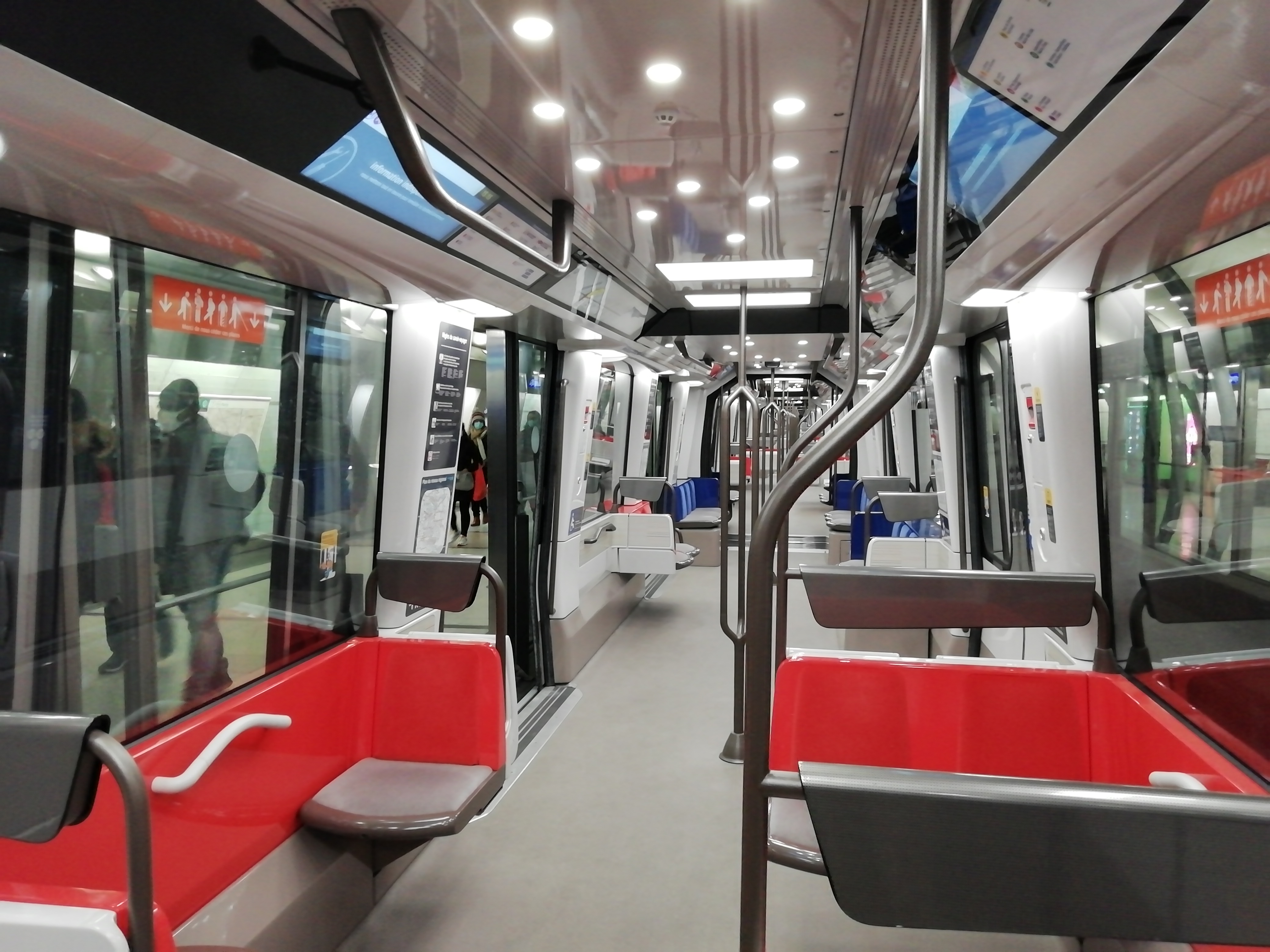
Interior of an MP14-8

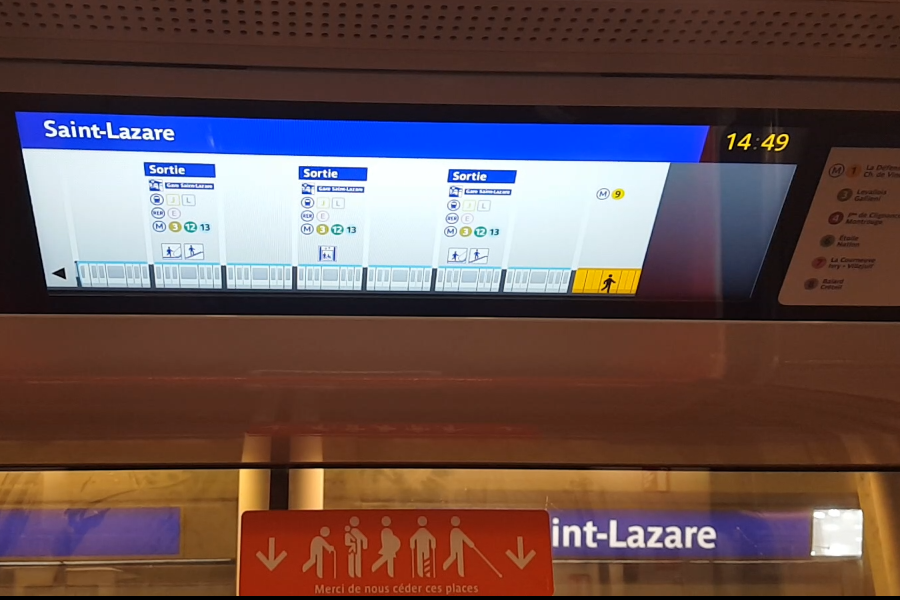
Dynamic station plan in M14 MP14-8
