= Sprague-Thomson =

Paris Metro train, 1908-1983

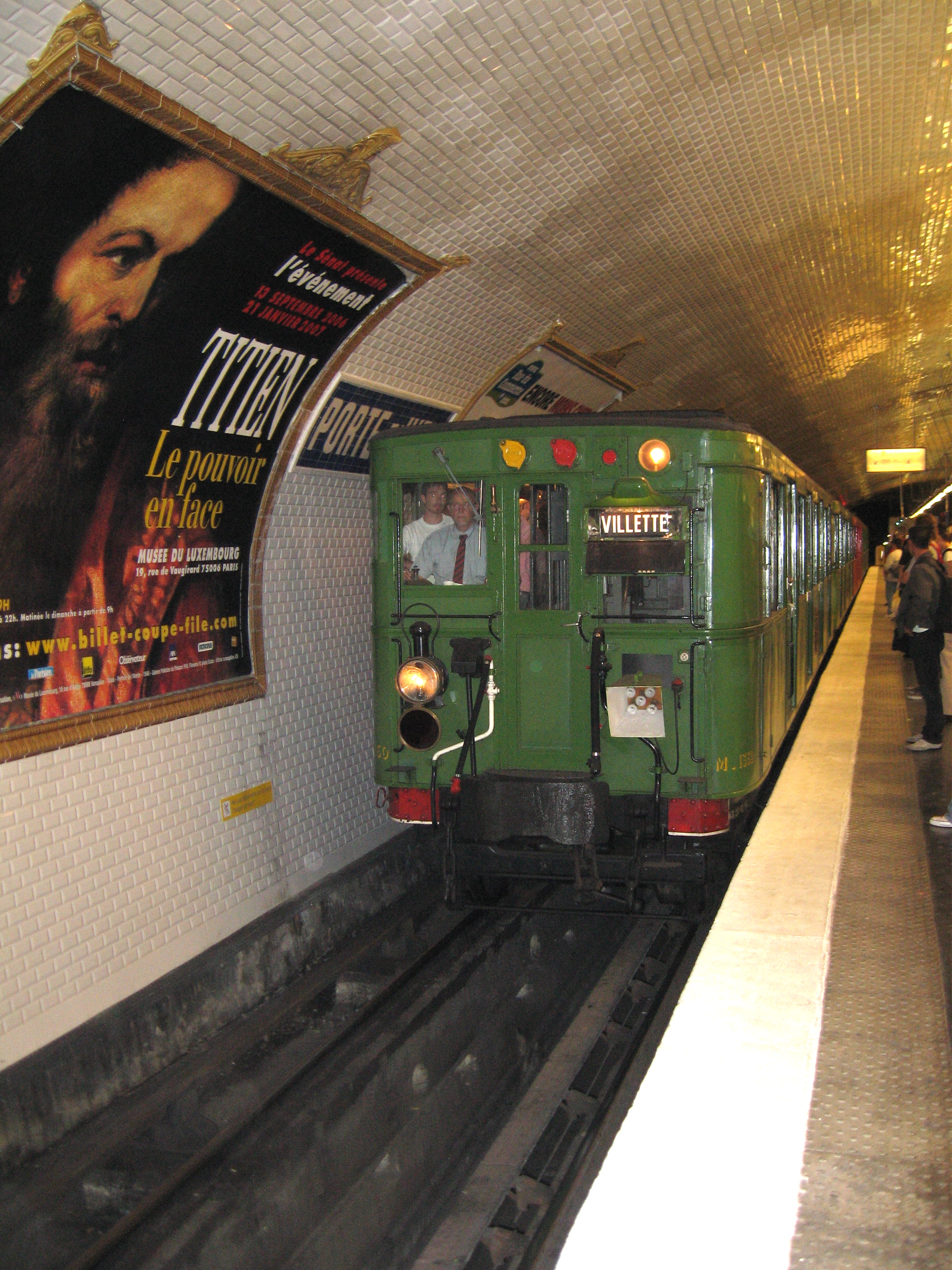
- A Sprague-Thomson train during the Journées du patrimoine in 2006
- In service: 1908–1983 (in work trains until 2011)
- Replaced: M1
- Constructed: 1907–1936
- Scrapped: 1950s–1983
- Number built: 2700+
- Number in service: 0 cars
- Number preserved: 5 cars (A.475), 4 maintenance tractors
- Number scrapped: 2700+
- Successor: MA 51/52; MP 55; MP 59; MF 67; MP 73; MF 77
- Formation: 3, 4 or 5 per trainset
- Operators: CMP (green, gray and red colors); Nord-Sud (blue and cream); RATP

Specifications
- Train length: 35–70 m (115–230 ft) (3-5 car trains)
- Car length: 12–15 m (39–49 ft)
- Width: 2,400 mm (94 in)
- Doors: 4 per side
- Maximum speed: 70 km/h (43 mph)
- Electric system: 750 V DC Third rail

Sprague-Thomson was the name of the first rolling stock on the Paris Metro made completely of metal. The first cars entered service in 1908 to replace the mostly wooden M1, and were retired from passenger service in 1983, after 75 years of service, making them the longest-used rolling stock type in the Paris Metro. However, some Sprague-Thomson cars converted into work trains remained in service until 8 March 2011.

== Legacy ==
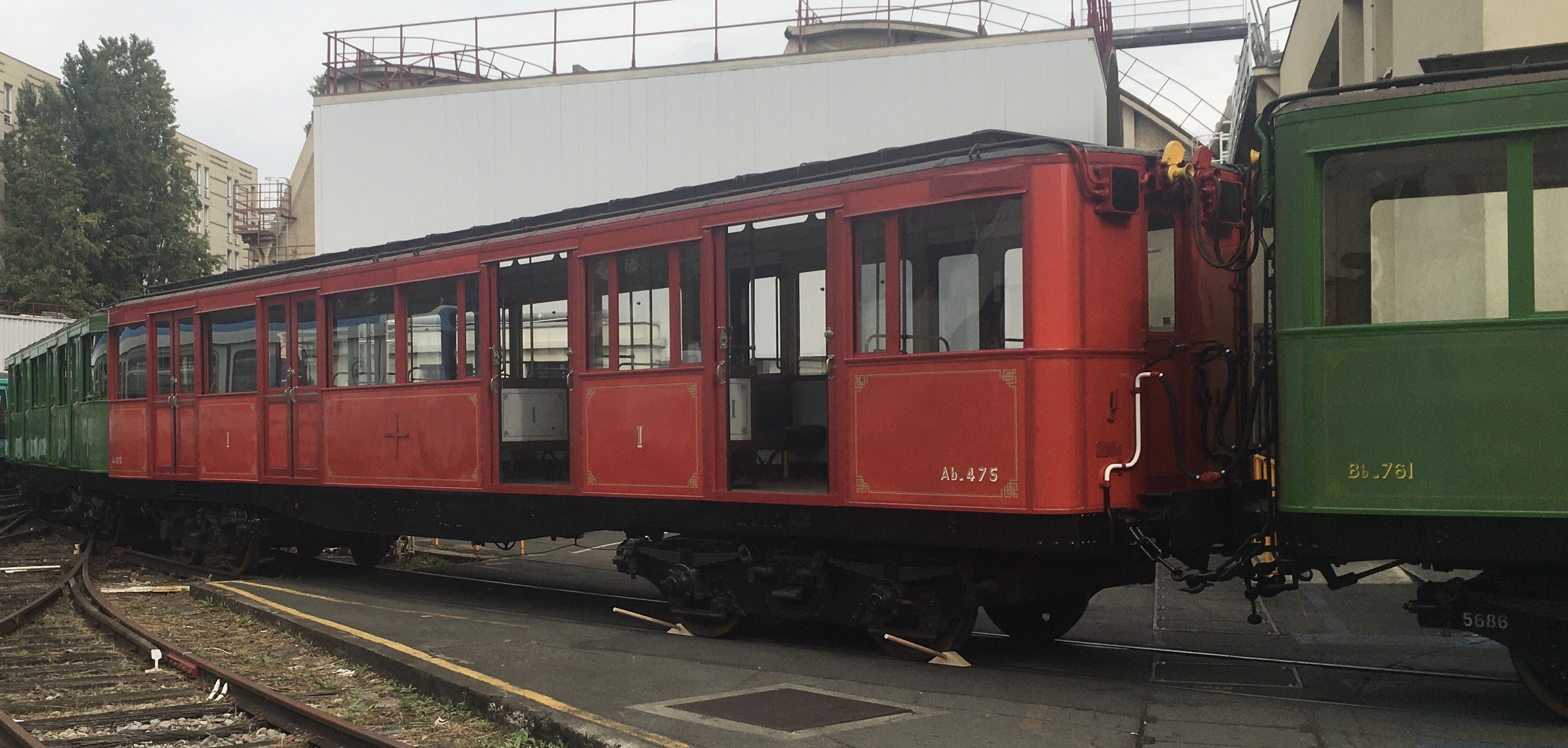
The 5-set cars preserved Sprague-Thomson at Choisy metro workshops during Journées du patrimoine 2023

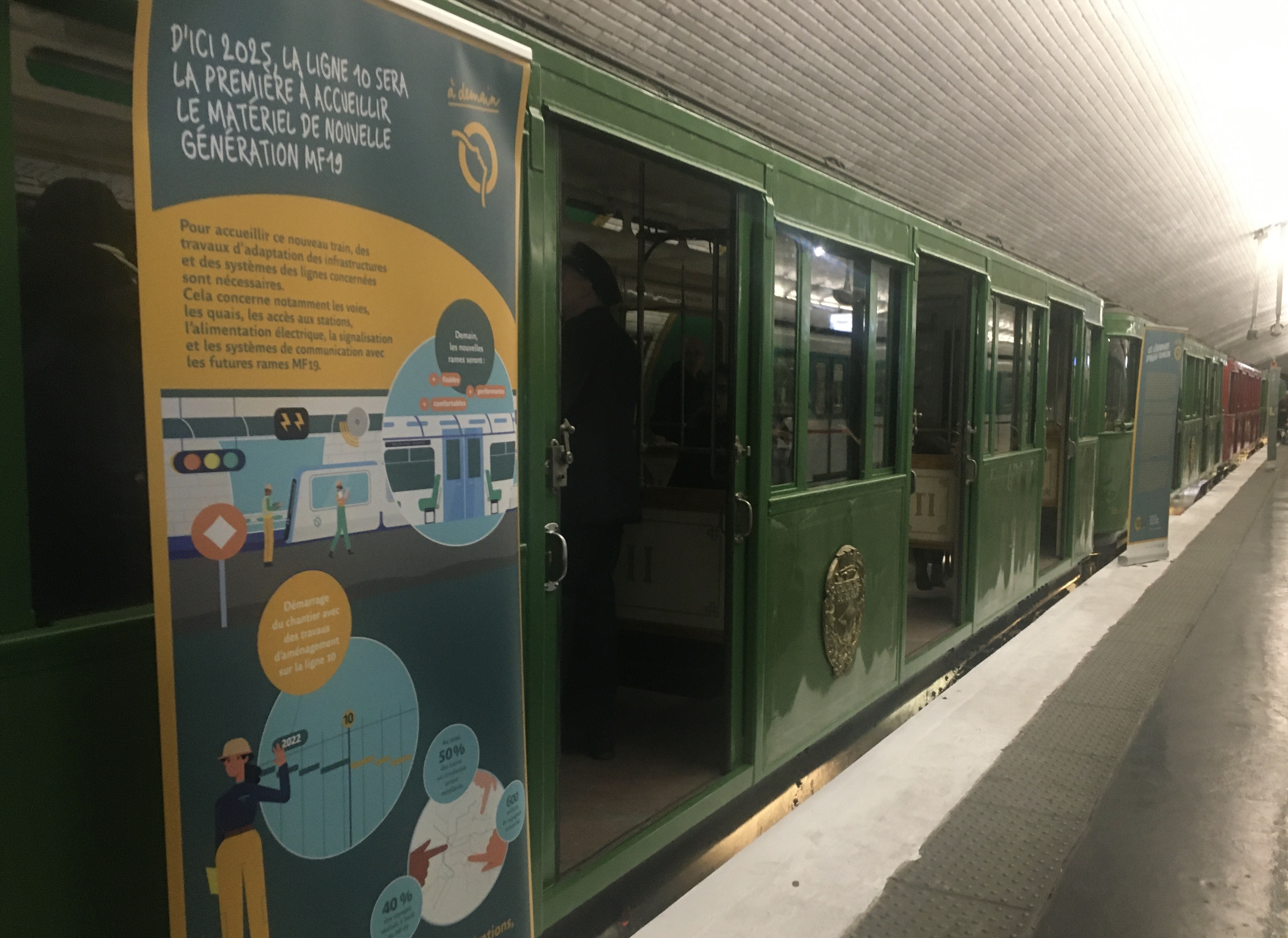
The 5-set cars preserved Sprague-Thomson at Porte d'Auteuil station in December 2023.

The RATP has preserved three Sprague train sets, only one of which is currently usable by passengers. From time to time it is exhibited on certain lines and by organisations such as ADEMAS or COPEF, or used in movies, e.g. in Les Femmes de l'ombre.

Five cars (of which two are 2nd class, with their power car, and one is 1st class, with a trailer) were classified as historical monuments on December 18, 1998. Another car, a second class power car, is preserved at the Vaugirard depot and was 'classified' on 17 February 2000.

The historical train was abandoned in a secret tunnel from the mid-2010s, then renovated during 2023. The train was later displayed at Porte d'Auteuil for the centenary of Line 10.
