= MP 51 =

French prototype rubber-tyred metro train

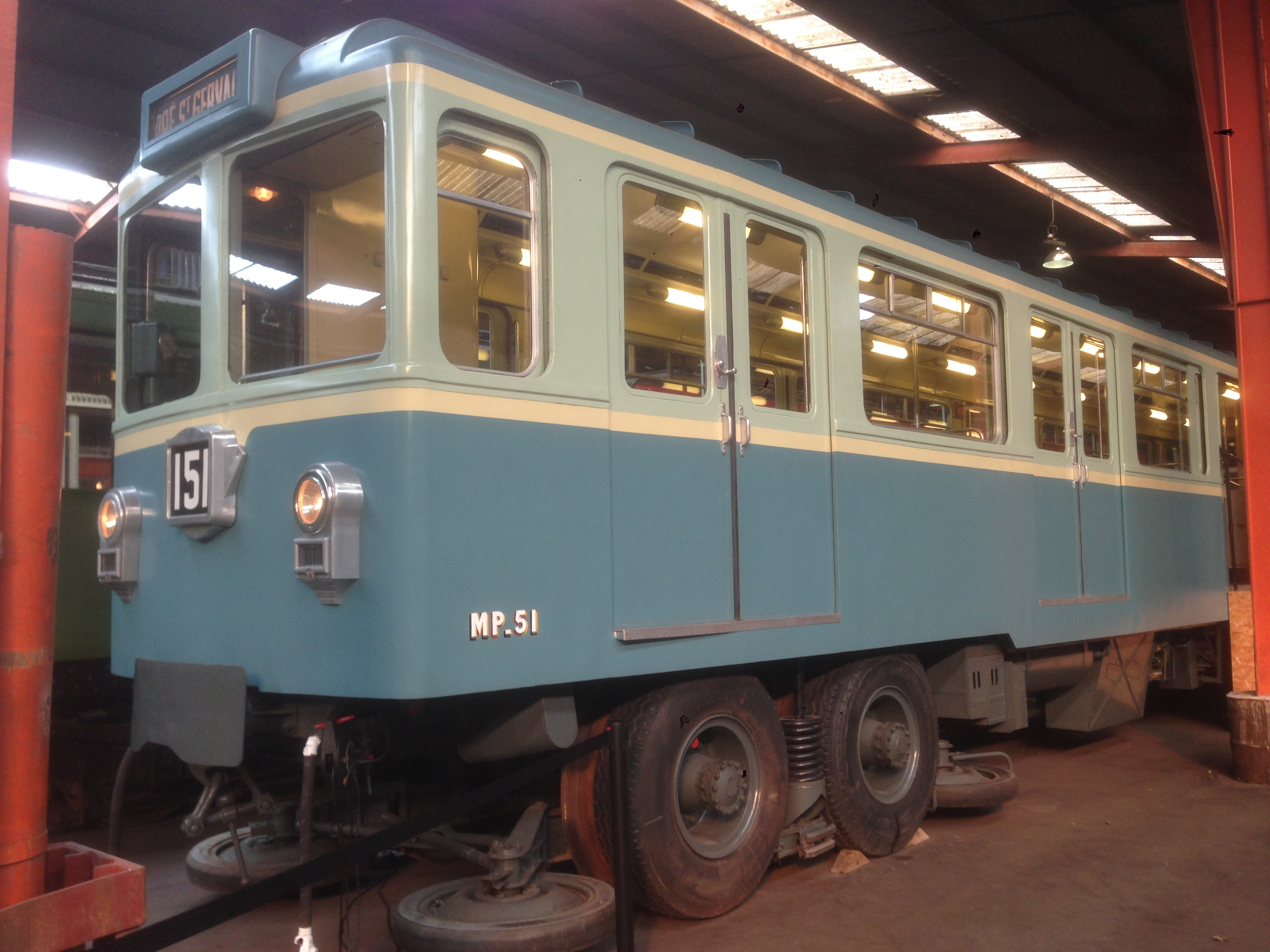
- MP 51 car no. 151 of the RATP historical collection in Villeneuve-Saint-Georges
- Stock type: Rubber-tyred metro electric multiple unit
- In service: 1952–1956
- Successor: MP 55
- Operator: RATP
- Line served: Voie navette

The MP 51 (fr) was the first rubber-tyred metro prototype operated by the Régie autonome des transports parisiens (English: Autonomous Parisian Transportation Administration, RATP) on the Paris Metro system, starting in 1951.

== History ==
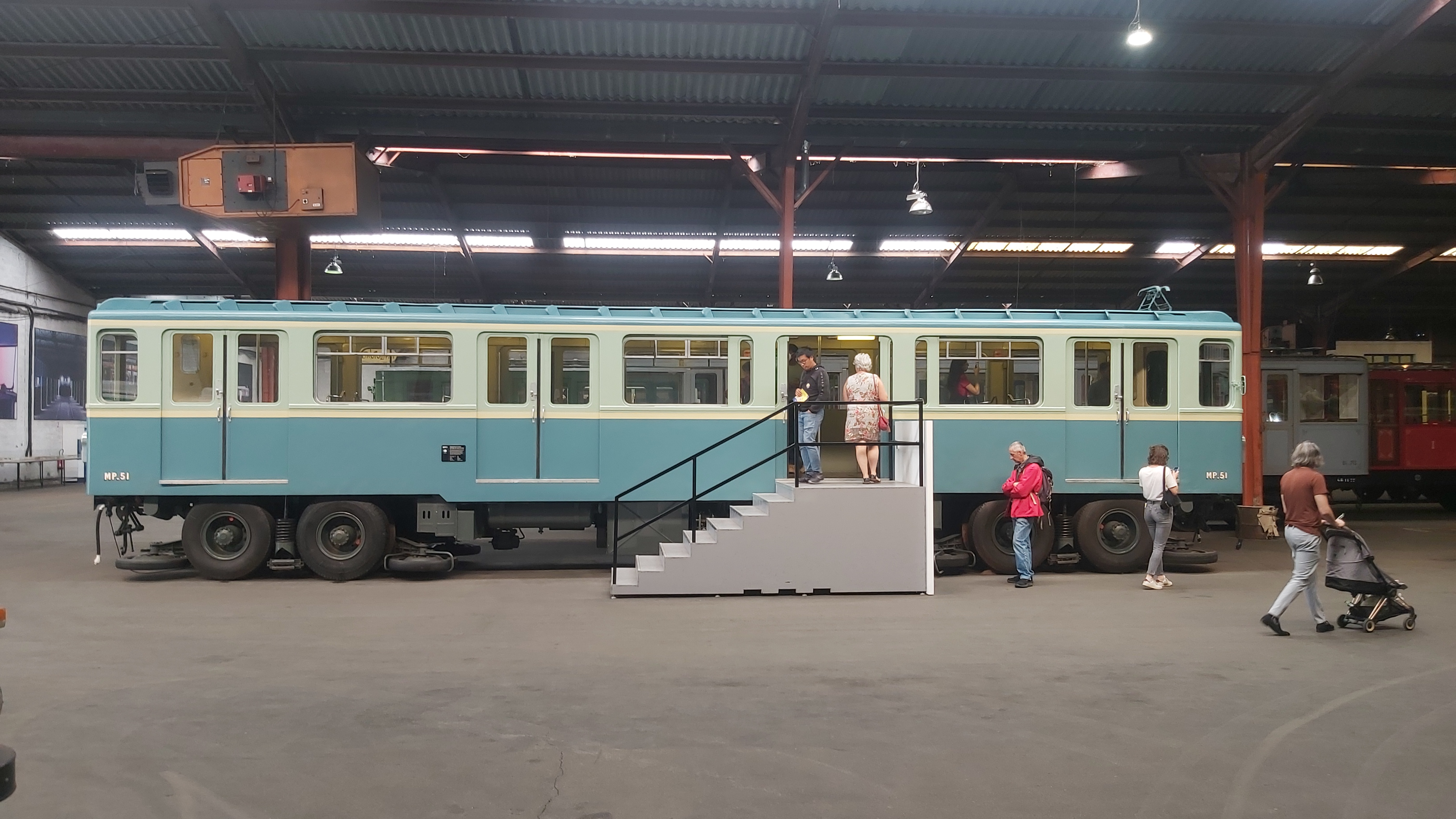
Side view of a preserved MP 51

The MP 51 was fitted with GoA 2 automatic train operation from the start. It ran with passengers from 13 April 1952 until 31 May 1956 and was used as a test bed for rubber-tyred metro technology and automatic train operation. Lack of funds prevented installation of automatic train operation on the rest of the Paris Metro until 1966, starting with line 11. Line 14, opened in 1998, was the first newly built Paris Metro to operate in GoA 4, and Line 1 later also had its GoA 2 ATO system from 1972 replaced to a newer GoA 4 CBTC system.

== Operations ==
The MP 51 operated a shuttle service on la voie navette of the Paris Metro. The short service, only 770 m (2,530 ft) long, featured sharp turns and steep grades, characteristics well-suited to rubber-tyred metro trains.

The MP 51 featured a GoA 2 system with an ATO "mat" fitted onto the underfloor of the train, continuously in contact with a guide-line between the tracks nicknamed "Grecque." During its operation on la voie navette, train drivers often prompted passengers to "operate the train" by pushing the ATO start button.

== See also ==
- MA 51
- MP 55
