= MP 59 =

Paris Metro train

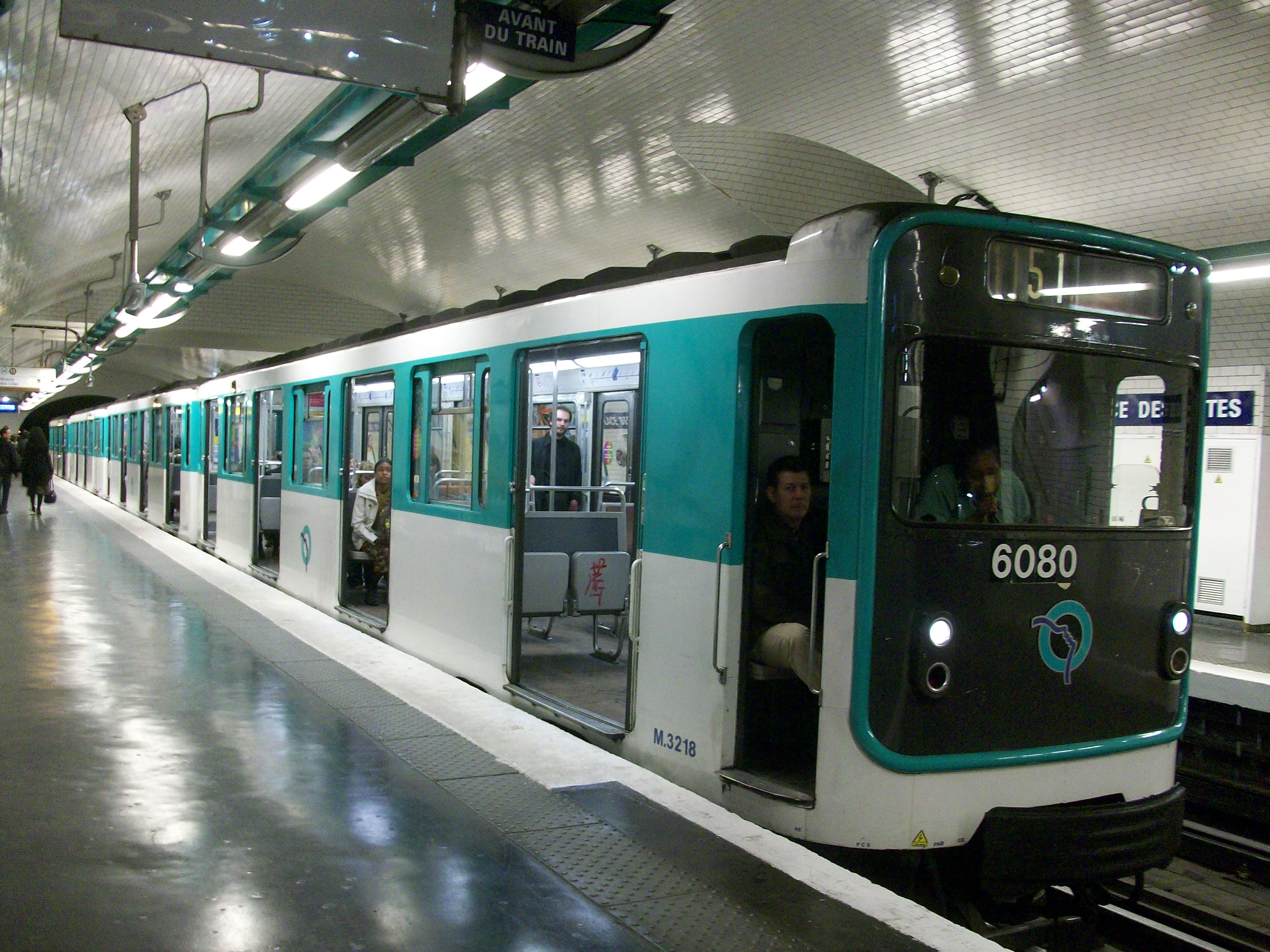
- Refurbished MP 59 train operating on Line 11

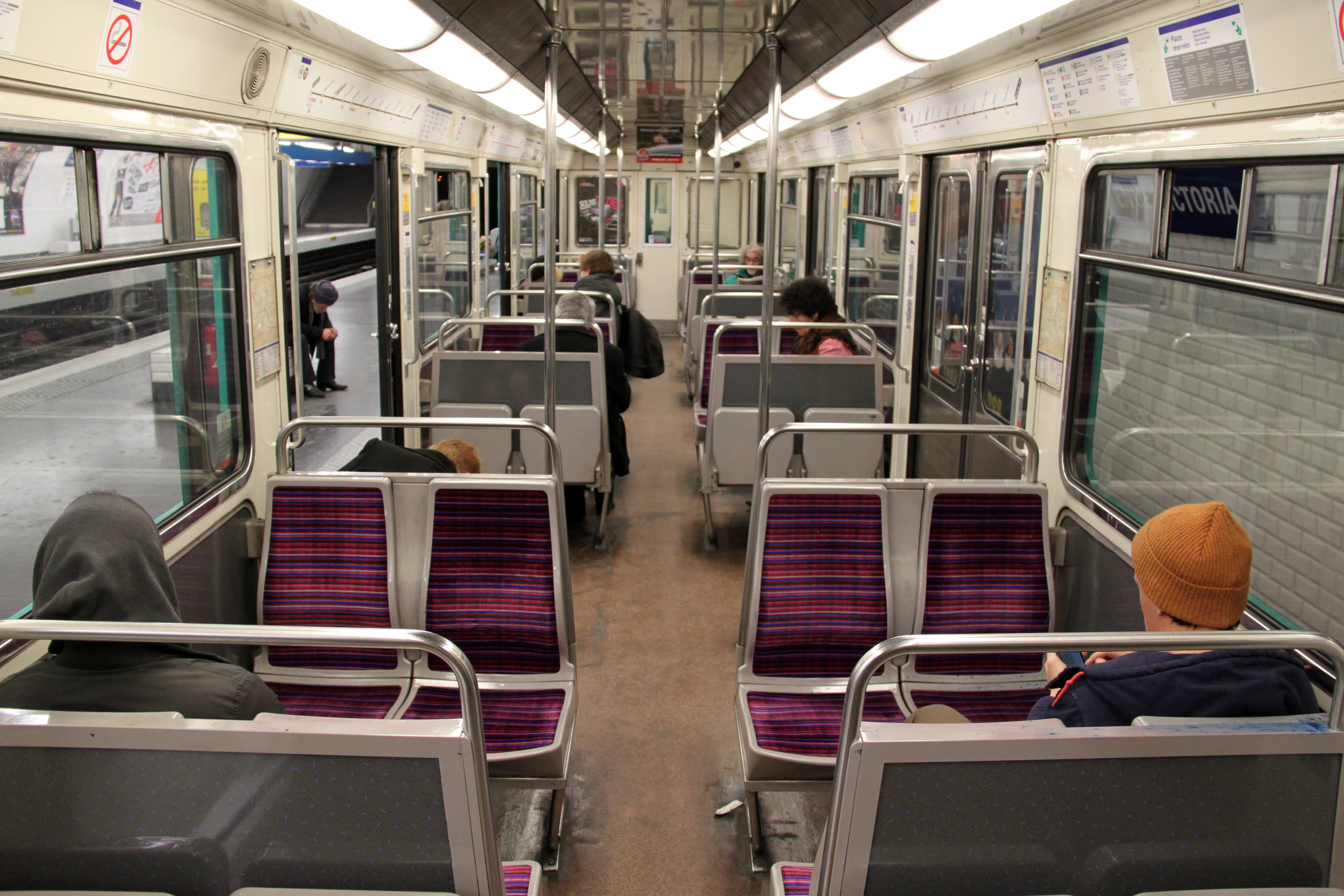
- Renovated interior of an MP 59 train
- In service: 30 May 1963 – 13 June 2024
- Manufacturers: Alsthom, CEM, CIMT, Jeumont-Schneider
- Replaced: Sprague-Thomson; MP 55
- Constructed: 1963–1967
- Refurbished: 1989–1994
- Scrapped: 1999–2024
- Number built: 607 cars (101 trainsets)
- Successor: MP 89, MP 14
- Formation: 4 cars; 6 cars
- Operator: RATP
- Lines served: (until 2000); (until 2012); (until 2024)

Specifications
- Train length: 4-car set: 60 m (196 ft 10 in); 6-car set: 90 m (295 ft 3 in)
- Car length: 15 m (49 ft 3 in)
- Width: 2.45 m (8 ft 0 in)
- Doors: 4 pairs per side, per car
- Maximum speed: 70 km/h (43 mph)
- Traction system: Resistor control
- Traction motors: Alsthom Type MP3
- Power output: 1,760 kW (2,360 hp)
- Acceleration: 3.5 km/(h⋅s) (2.2 mph/s)
- Deceleration: 4.5 km/(h⋅s) (2.8 mph/s)
- Electric systems: Guide bar, 750 V DC
- Current collection: Contact shoes, side running on the vertical face of the guide bars
- Bogies: ANF Type MP59
- Braking systems: Disc, rheostatic
- Track gauge: 1,435 mm (4 ft 8 1/2 in) standard gauge, with running pads for the rubber-tyred wheels outside of the steel rails

The MP 59 (French: Métro Pneu appel d'offres de 1959; English: Rubber-tyred metro ordered in 1959) was a rubber-tyred variant of electric multiple units used in service on the Paris Metro from 1963 to 2024. Manufactured by a consortium between CIMT-Lorraine (body), Jeumont-Schneider (control circuits), Alsthom and CEM (motors), they were first introduced in 1963 when the busiest routes of Lines 1 and 4 were converted to rubber-tyred pneumatic operation. The trains worked on Line 1 between 1963 and 2000, Line 4 between 1966 and 2012, and Line 11 between 1995 and 2024. By the time of their retirement in June 2024, the MP 59 trains (along with the Sprague-Thomson) were among the oldest trains still in use on any metro system in the world, at 61 years old.

== Exit from Line 4 ==
With the arrival of the MP 05 automated stock on Line 1, the remaining 48 MP 59 trains on Line 4 were replaced by the MP 89 CC (just like their Line 1 counterparts were). The first MP 89CC train (#01) arrived on Line 4 in April 2011 and went into service on May 23, 2011. The first MP 59 train to be retired from service was #049, which was withdrawn in April 2011. #021 was withdrawn on December 21, 2012, and was the last train to be retired.

It was originally speculated that some trains would be moved to Line 11 as a supplement, but such plans never came to fruition. All of the trains in service on Line 4 have been scrapped, the spare parts were salvaged for the remaining trains on Line 11.

== Exit from Line 11 ==
Île-de-France Mobilités replaced the last MP 59 trains on Line 11 with 39 MP 14 trains: the replacement MP 14 trains for Line 11 are driver-operated and five cars long. The last MP 59 trains were scheduled to run on 23 May 2024, but a few trains were still in service as of June 2024. The last MP 59 trains ran on Line 11 on June 12, 2024, before the line extension to Rosny–Bois-Perrier when six new stations opened on June 13, 2024.

== Gallery ==
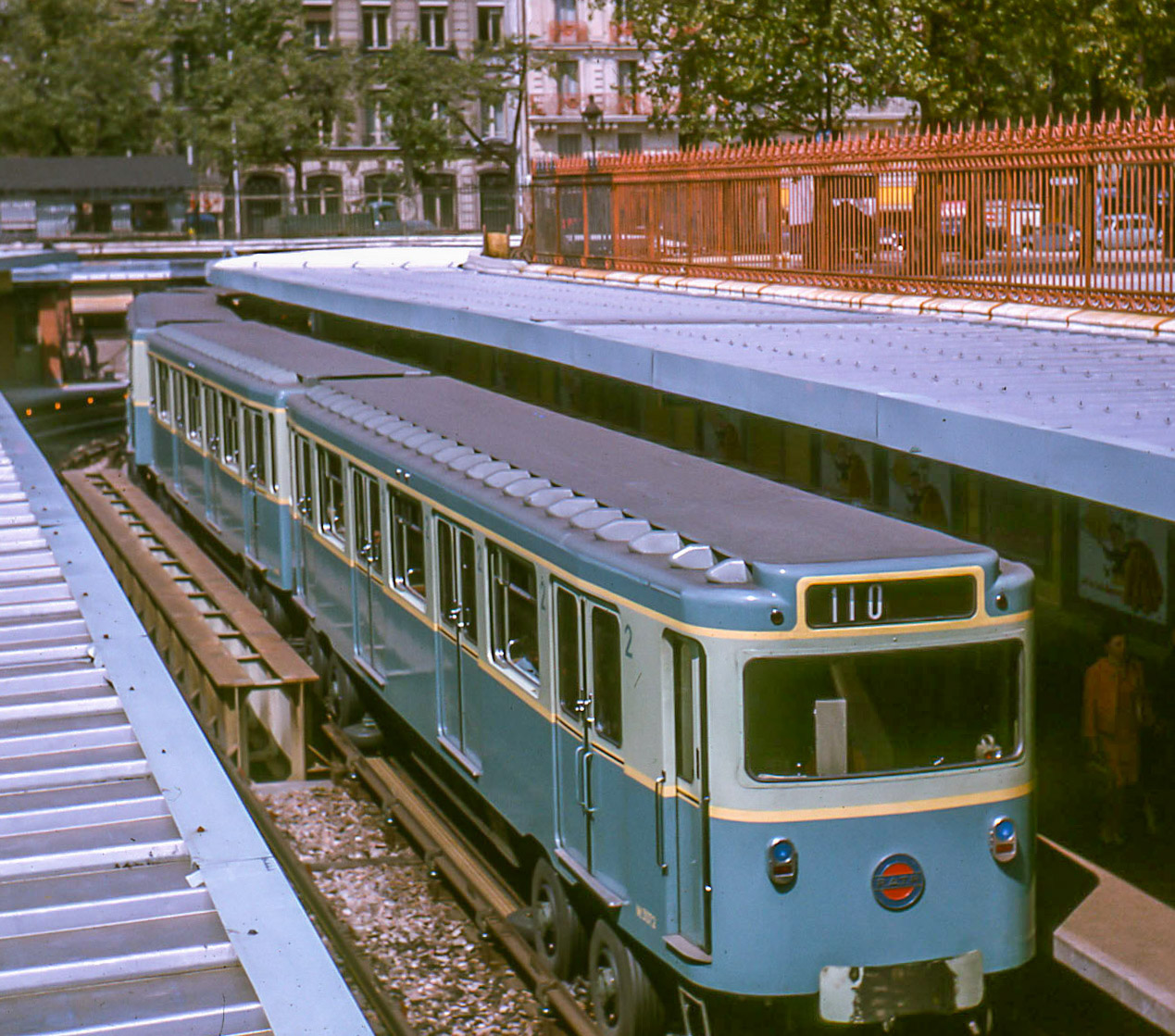
MP 59 at Bastille station in 1964

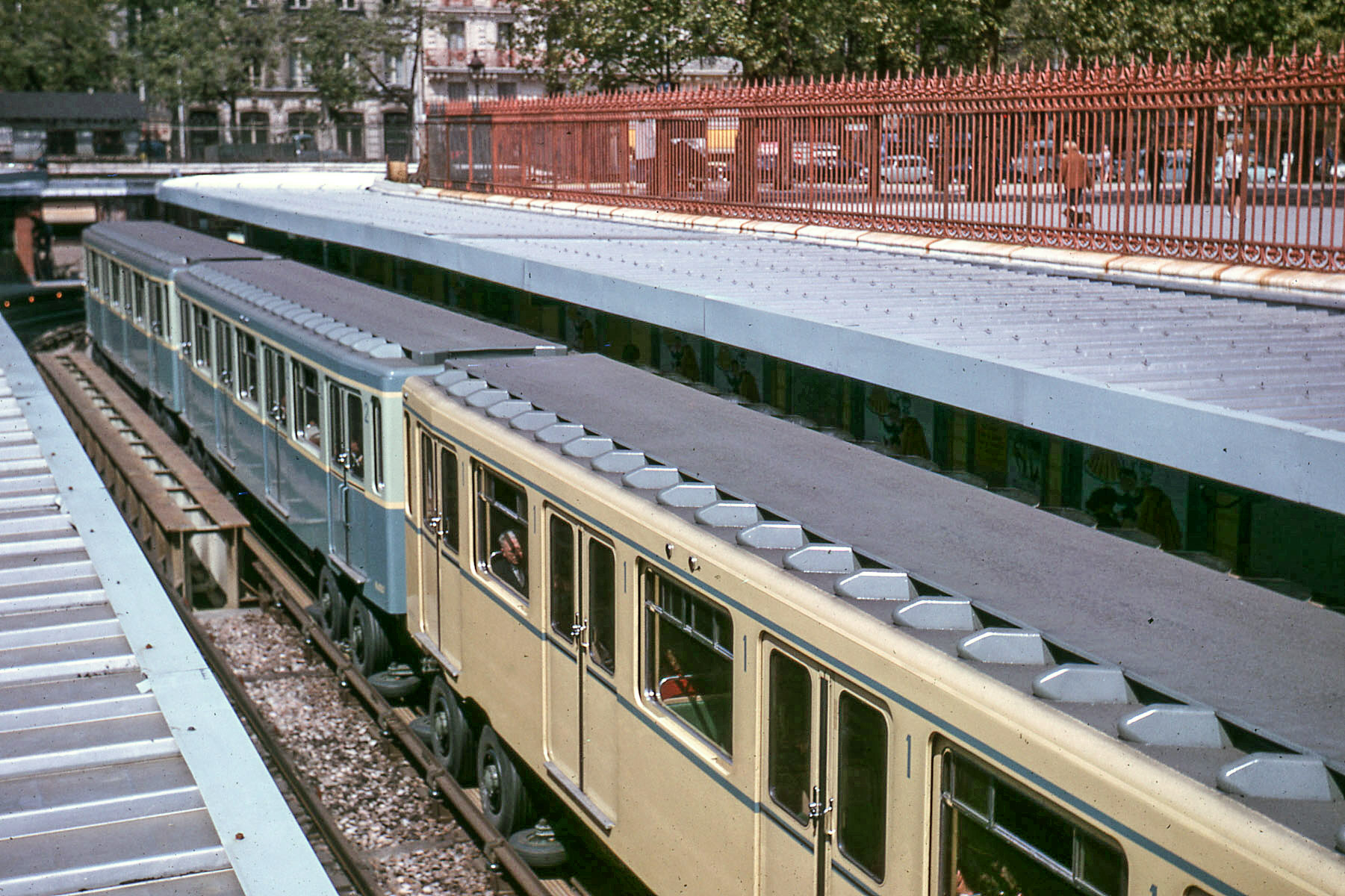
Blue second-class and cream-coloured first class MP 59 cars in 1964

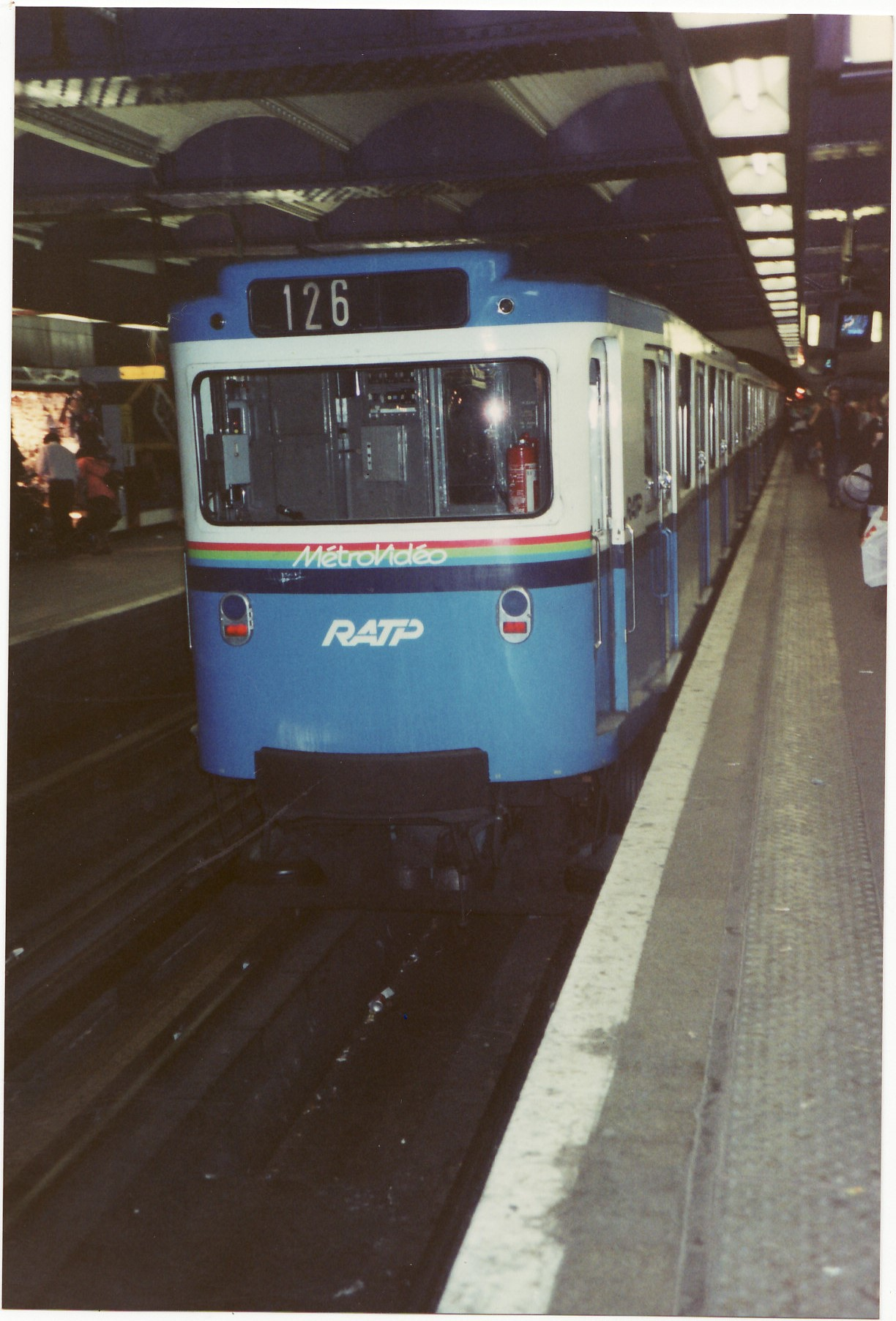
MP 59 trainset 6005 in "Métro-Vidéo" livery in 1989

An MP 59 leaving République on June 12, 2024, the last day of their service.

== Technical specifications ==
- Train length: 90.390 m (296 ft 6 5/8 in)
- Overall width: 2.400 m (7 ft 10 1/2 in)
- Height of a train car above the running surface: 3.485 m (11 ft 5 1/4 in)
- Floor height above the running surface: 1.180 m (46.46 in)
- Weight in running order: 126.4 tonnes (124.4 long tons; 139.3 short tons)
- Maximum capacity (at four travelers / m^{2}): 700 passengers including 144 seats
- Folding seats available off-peak: 146
- Maximum speed: 70 km/h (43 mph)
- Maximum power: 1,760 kW (2,360 hp)
- Average acceleration of 1.3 m/s^{2} (4.3 ft/s^{2}) from 0 to 30 km/h (0 to 19 mph) (four travelers / m^{2});
- Maximum braking normal steady state: 2 m/s^{2} (6.6 ft/s^{2})

== Other networks ==
- Montreal Metro had a forked version named MR-63
- Mexico City Metro has a forked version named MP-68
- Santiago Metro has a forked version named NS-74
