= MP 05 =

Paris Metro train

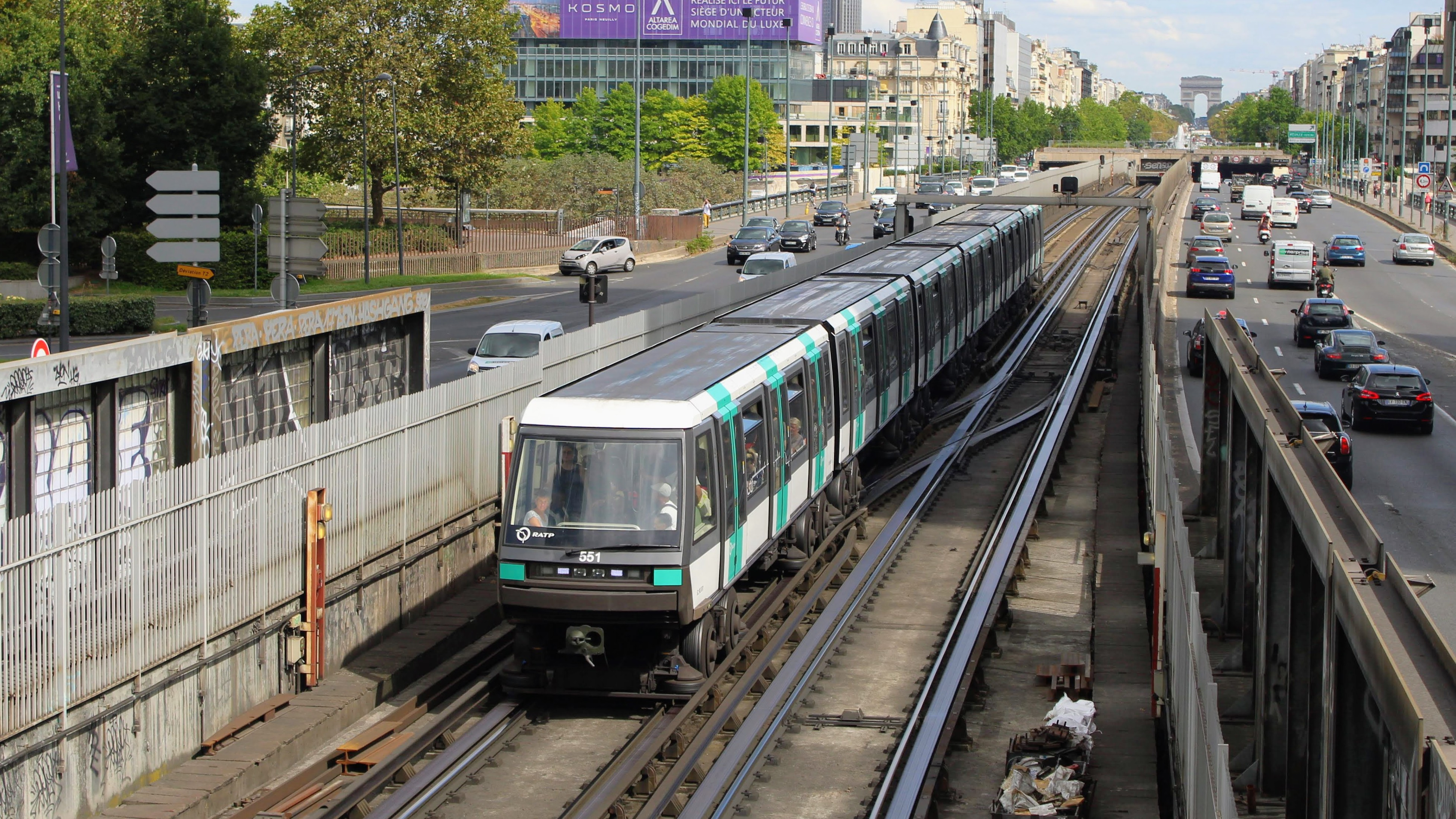
- MP 05 train on Line 1, between Esplanade de La Défense and Pont de Neuilly stations.

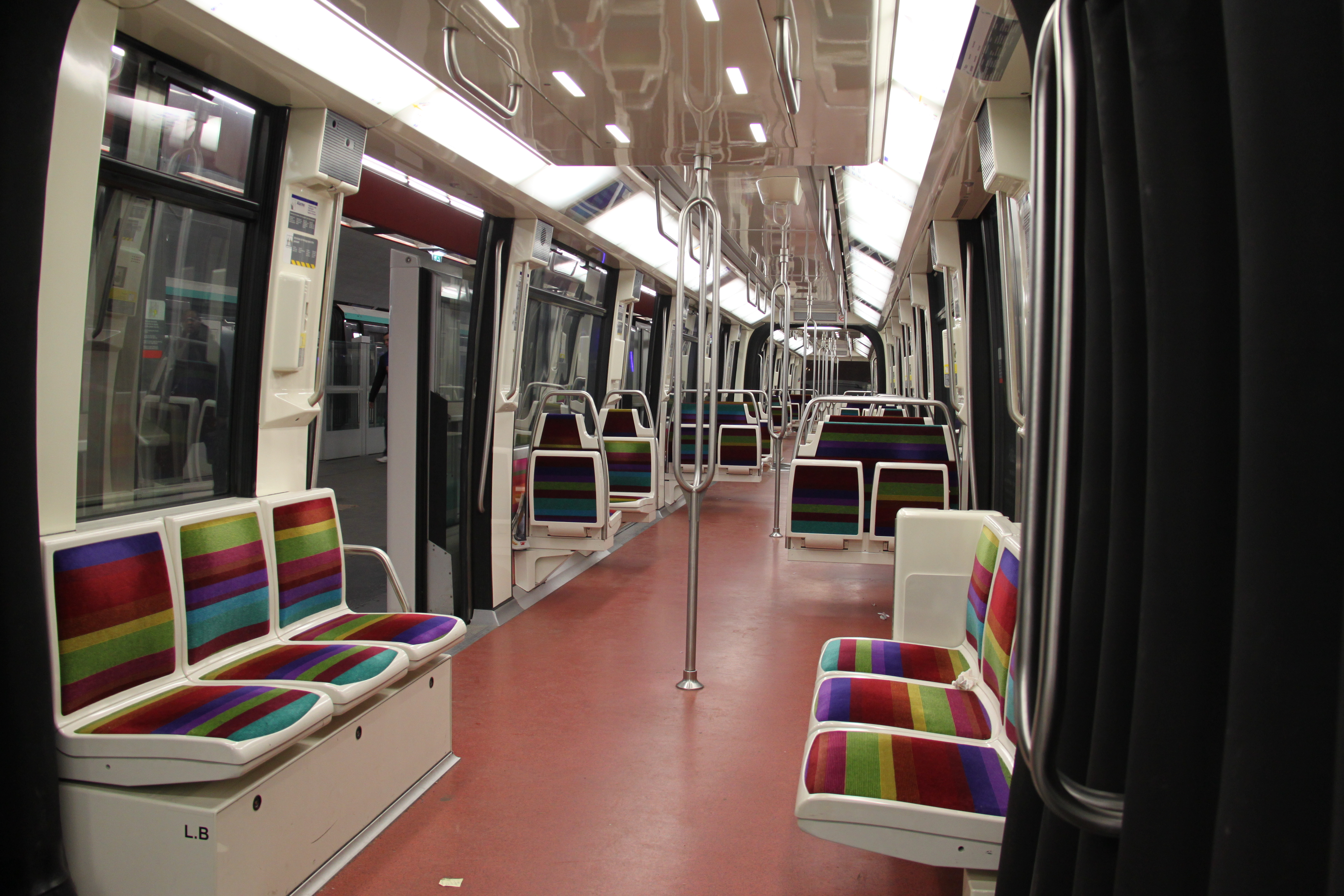
- Interior of an MP 05 train
- In service: 3 November 2011–present
- Manufacturer: Alstom
- Family name: Metropolis
- Replaced: MP 89 CC (transferred to other lines)
- Constructed: 2008–2015
- Number built: 67
- Formation: 6 cars per trainset
- Capacity: 722 per train
- Operator: RATP
- Line served: Paris Metro Paris Metro Line 1 Paris Metro Line 4

Specifications
- Car body construction: Aluminium
- Train length: 90.28 m (296 ft 2 in)
- Car length: 15.04 m (49 ft 4 in)
- Width: 2.45 m (8 ft 0 in)
- Height: 3.48 m (11 ft 5 in)
- Doors: 3 pairs per side, per car
- Maximum speed: 80 km/h (50 mph)
- Traction system: Alstom ONIX 172 MP IGBT-VVVF
- Traction motors: 3-phase AC induction motors type 4ELA 2848 C
- Power output: 2,200 kW (3,000 hp)
- Transmission: Elastic coupling, gear wheel and reduction gear wheel into the wheels, 1:9.113 ratio
- Acceleration: 4.86 km/(h⋅s) (3.02 mph/s) maximum
- Deceleration: 6.4 km/(h⋅s) (4.0 mph/s) (emergency brake)
- Electric systems: Guide bar, 750 V DC
- Current collection: Contact shoes, side running on the vertical face of the guide bars
- UIC classification: 2′2′+B′B′+B′B′+B′B′+B′B′+2′2′
- Bogies: Type CL449
- Braking systems: Disc, electrodynamic, regenerative
- Coupling system: Scharfenberg type
- Track gauge: 1,435 mm (4 ft 8 1/2 in) standard gauge, with running pads for the rubber tired wheels outside of the steel rails

The MP 05 (French: Métro sur Pneu d'appel d'offres de 2005; English: Rubber-tyred metro ordered in 2005) is a rubber-tyred electric multiple unit with driverless operation ordered by the RATP in 2005 for the Paris Metro. The original 49 units were designed to allow the older MP 89s on line 1 to transfer to line 4 in order to automate the line. An additional fleet of 18 MP 05s was ordered for deployment on the line 14 by 2017 in order to improve service frequencies and to prepare for the line's northern extension towards Mairie de Saint-Ouen, as well as provide service enhancements to Line 1. The trainsets were constructed by Alstom.

The MP 05 trains are the second Paris Metro rolling stock to include air conditioning, with the MF 01 rolling stock being the first.

== History ==
=== Automation of Line 1 ===
Following the success of the completely automated line 14 during the early 2000s, the RATP planned to automate additional lines. Automation would not only allow for Paris to remain as a model for technological innovations in the railway industry but also would permit an increase in the number of lines in normal service when RATP workers are striking.

The RATP first focused on line 1, the busiest line of the network and the line most used by tourists. However, the line's MP 89 CC rolling stock was not equipped to be automated. The RATP opted to replacing the rolling stock rather than retrofitting it since the existing MP 89 trainsets could be repurposed as-is to replace the aging MP 59s on line 4.

On 23 October 2015 Alstom and the RATP celebrated the production of the 67th and final MP 05 railcar.

== Formations ==
=== Current lines ===
use trains in a 6-car formation (4M2T).

As of February 2024, 56 six-car sets (501 to 556) are allocated to Fontenay depot for use on Line 1.

	<- La Defense Ch. de Vincennes ->					
Car No.	1	2	3	4	5	6
Type	S	N	N	N	N	S
Designation	S1 RA 5xx	N1 RA 5xx	N2 RA 5xx	N3 RA 5xx	N4 RA 5xx	S2 RA 5xx

use trains in a 6-car formation (4M2T).

As of 10 February 2023, 11 six-car sets are allocated to Saint-Ouen depot for use on Line 4.

	<- P^{te} de Clignancourt Bagneux ->					
Car No.	1	2	3	4	5	6
Type	S	N	N	N	N	S
Designation	S1 RB 5xx	N1 RB 5xx	N2 RB 5xx	N3 RB 5xx	N4 RB 5xx	S2 RB 5xx

use trains in a 6-car formation (4M2T).

=== Former line ===
Before 2023, 14 six-car sets were allocated to Saint-Ouen depot and the now-closed Olympiades depot for use on Line 14.

	<- Saint-Ouen Olympiades ->					
Car No.	1	2	3	4	5	6
Type	S	N	N	N	N	S
Designation	S1 RC 5xx	N1 RC 5xx	N2 RC 5xx	N3 RC 5xx	N4 RC 5xx	S2 RC 5xx

- N: power car without driver's cab
- S: end car with or without driver's cab, not motorized

=== Transfer of Line 14 trains to Line 4 (2022) ===
As of 2015 it is expected that around 2020 the next generation MP 14 railcars of 8-car formations will begin to replace the MP 89 CA and MP 05 stock. This will allow both precedent stock to be reassigned to other lines, such as Line 1 or Line 4.

With the deliveries of the MP 14 ongoing as of January 2022, it is currently planned for all MP 05 trainsets on Line 14 to be moved over to Line 4, where they will operate alongside their MP 89 CA counterparts and some (6-car) MP 14 units. Trains that are being prepared for transfer are being repainted in the new Île-de-France Mobilités white/blue livery. The MP 05 trains entered service on Line 4 in September 2022 along with the MP 89 and MP 14 trains.

== Features and appearance ==
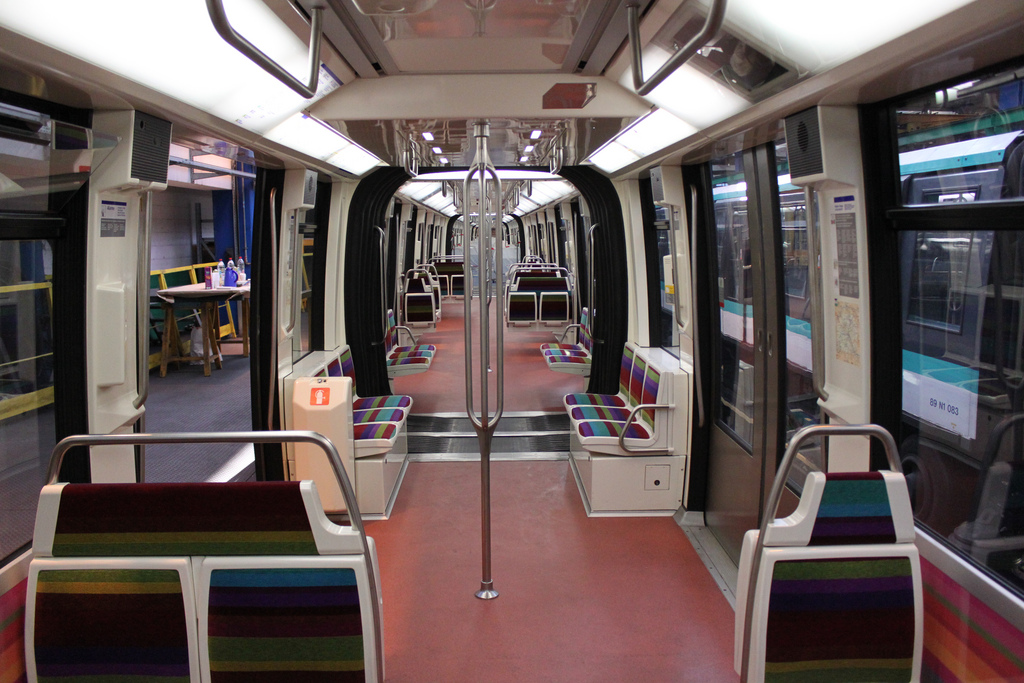
Interior arrangement of a new MP 05 train.

The MP 05s are based on the MP 89 CAs and their exterior appearance is the same; however, the MP 05 have brighter LED-type headlights compared to the MP 89.

The RATP opted for an interior also similar to that of the MP 89, with only the colors differing: the blue and gray tones replaced by an off-white tone, the floor colored brick red, and the seats with a rainbow pattern, in a design was conceived by Yo Kaminagai.

The trains are the first production sets to be equipped with the Dilidam multimedia system (first introduced in one MF 01 set) and security cameras; as well, they are the first rubber-tired rolling stock with an air conditioning system, with an output of 11 kW, housed on the roof. Most trains are equipped with rubber interconnecting gangways that are similar to that of the MP 89CA stock. However, trains #533 and onward are equipped with MF 01 type gangways.

== Technical specifications ==
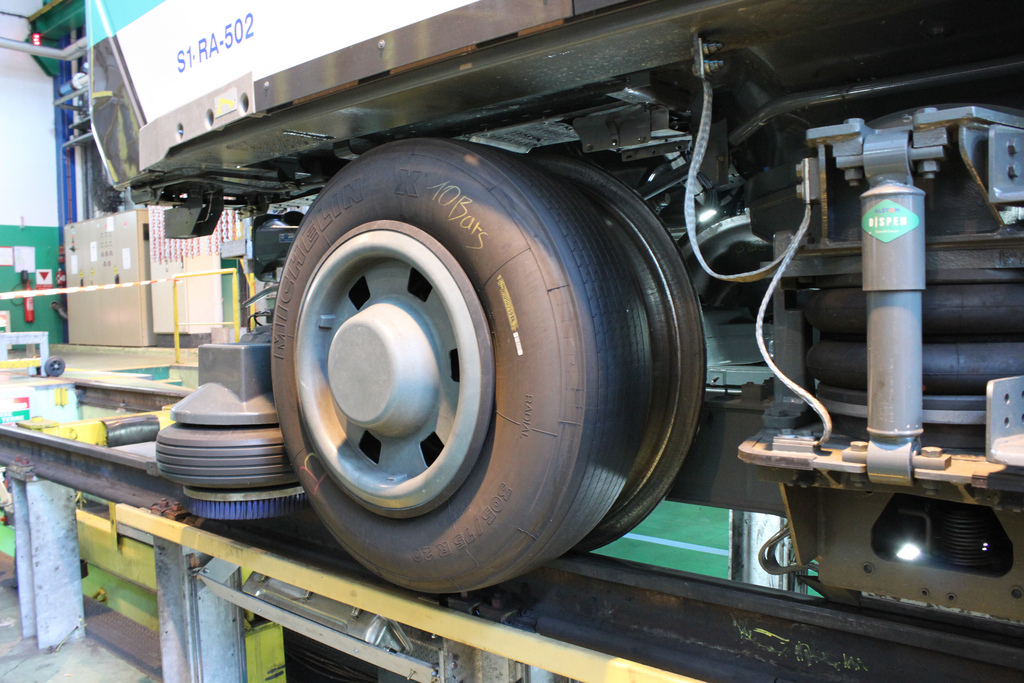
The bogie of an MP 05, showing the flanged steel wheel inside the rubber tired one, as well as the vertical contact shoe on top of the steel rail.

The technical specifications are similar to those of the MP 89, with some modern adaptations such as the electrical system, a multimedia system, and climate control. The MP 05's traction system is the same as the MF 01's. The MP 05 will have a lower noise level than the MP 89 due to improvements in the transmission.

- Length: 90,280 millimetres (296 ft 2 in)
- Width: 2,440 mm (8 ft 0 in)
- Height: 3,480 mm (11 ft 5.01 in)
- Composition: S+N+N+N+N+S
- Number of seats: 144
- Number of folding seats: 72
- Standing passenger capacity: 578 (4 passengers per 1 square metre (11 sq ft))
- Three doors per car (automatic)
- Power: 6 x 300 kW (400 hp) (1 induction motor per bogie)
- Speed: 80 km/h (50 mph)
- Starting acceleration: 1.35 m/s^{2} (4.4 ft/s^{2})
