= Dilidam =

Passenger information system in France

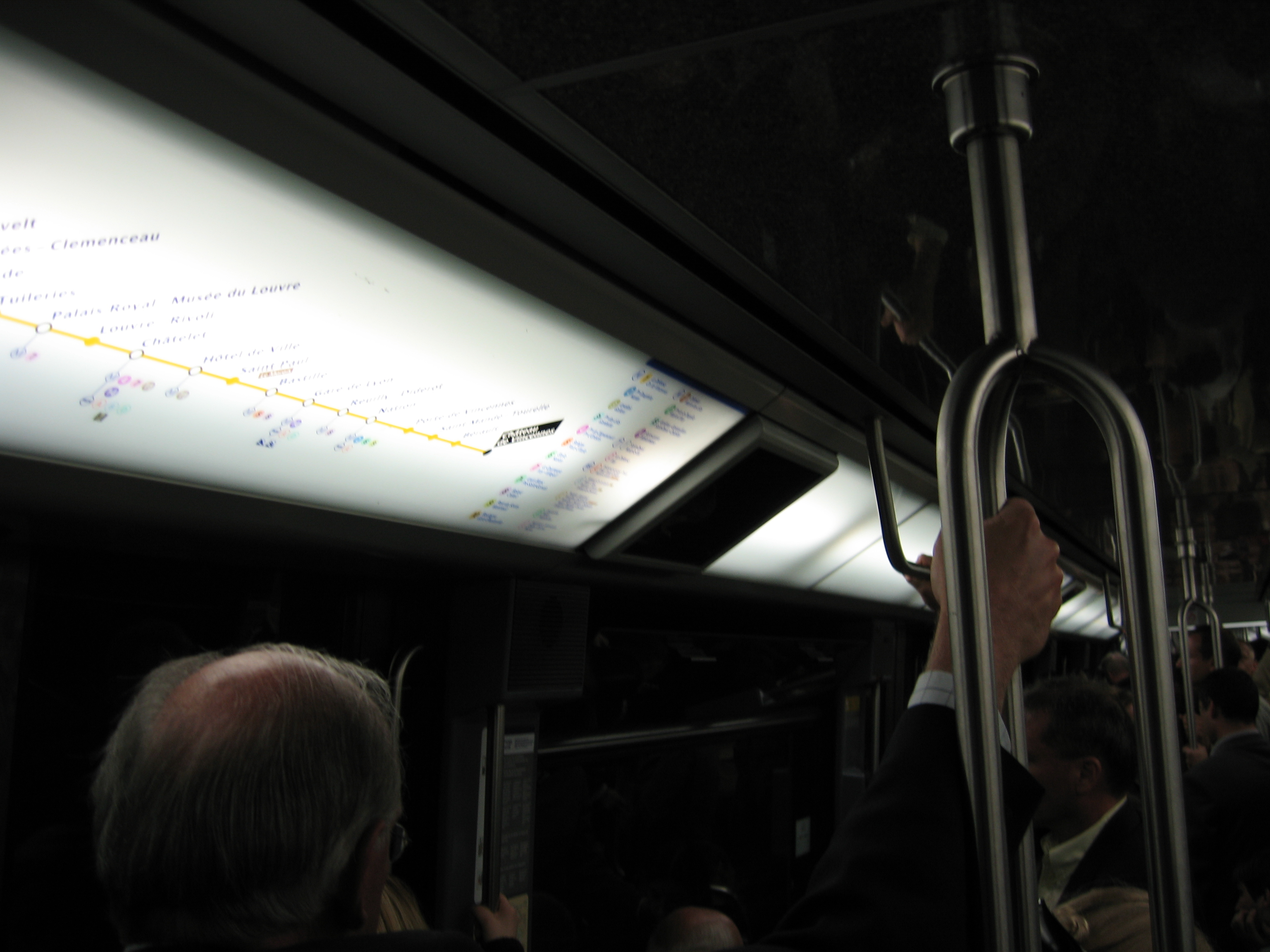
A trial of the Dilidam system on Paris Metro Line 1.

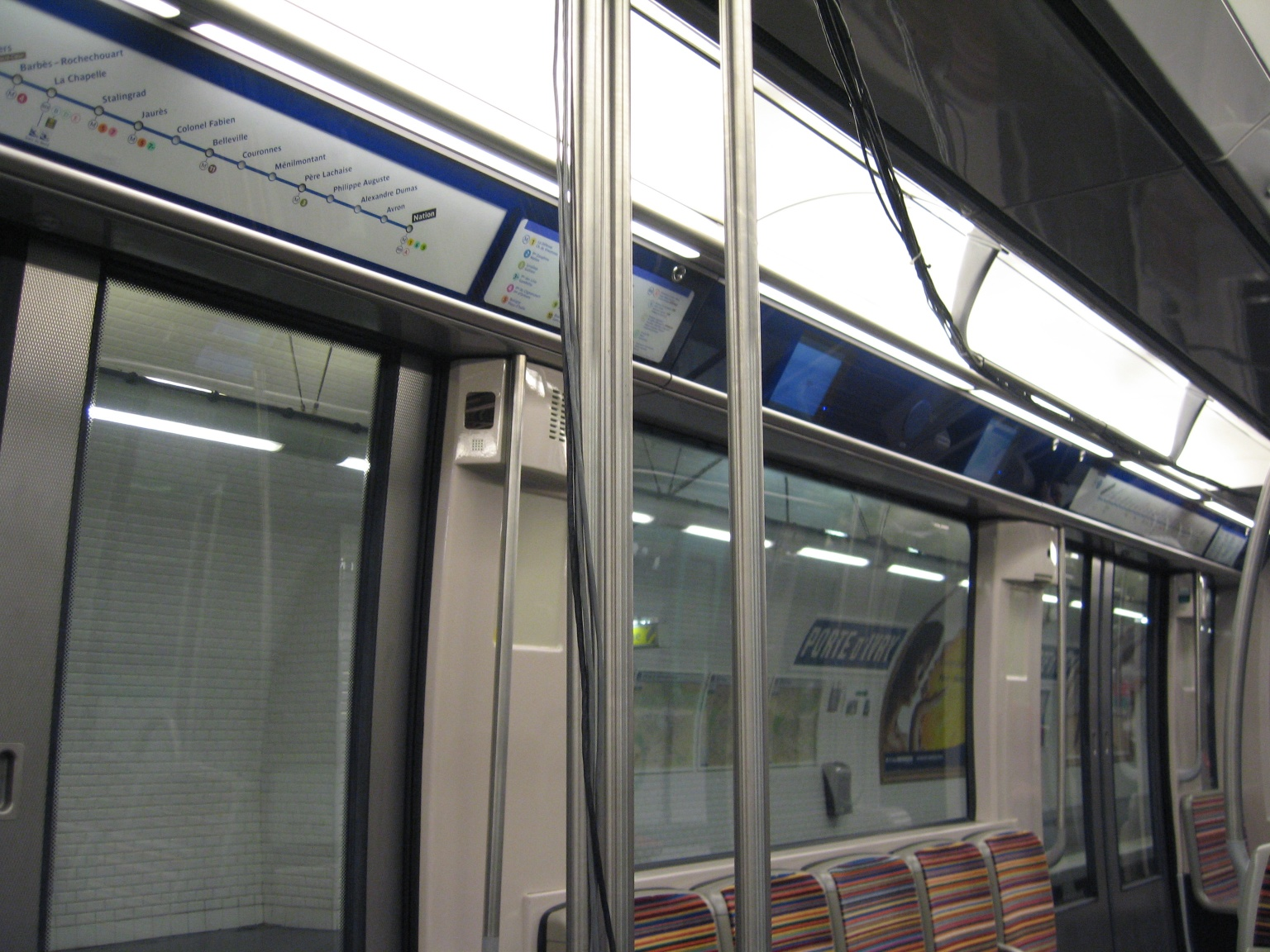
ASVA and Dilidam systems on an MF 2000 prototype.

Dilidam is a multimedia and passenger information system which provides route information to passengers on the RATP mass-transit system in Paris, France. The project was in a trial phase in Autumn 2005 and is now in regular use on several bus and metro lines in the region.

== Principles ==
The system consists of 17-inch LCD screens which display realtime information regarding the route, such as the next stops, schedules of connecting routes, and maps of the current area. In addition to this information, the system also provides more general information such as news bulletins, reports, video clips, announcements, and advertisements.

On buses, the system uses GPS in order to locate the vehicle. In addition, buses communicate directly with bus stops along the route via radio waves to apprise those waiting at the stop of the wait before the next bus will arrive.

== Deployment ==
In 2006 and 2007, the system was tested on line 38 of the RATP bus network as well as MP 89-model trains on Line 1 of the Paris Metro. This trial ended in 2007.

Currently, the system can be found in an MF 01 prototype train (train MF 01 001) which circulates on Line 2. The first production units to feature the system are the MP 05 trains deployed on Paris Metro Line 1 in 2012. Each of these trains are equipped with 4 screens per car.

== Technical specifications ==
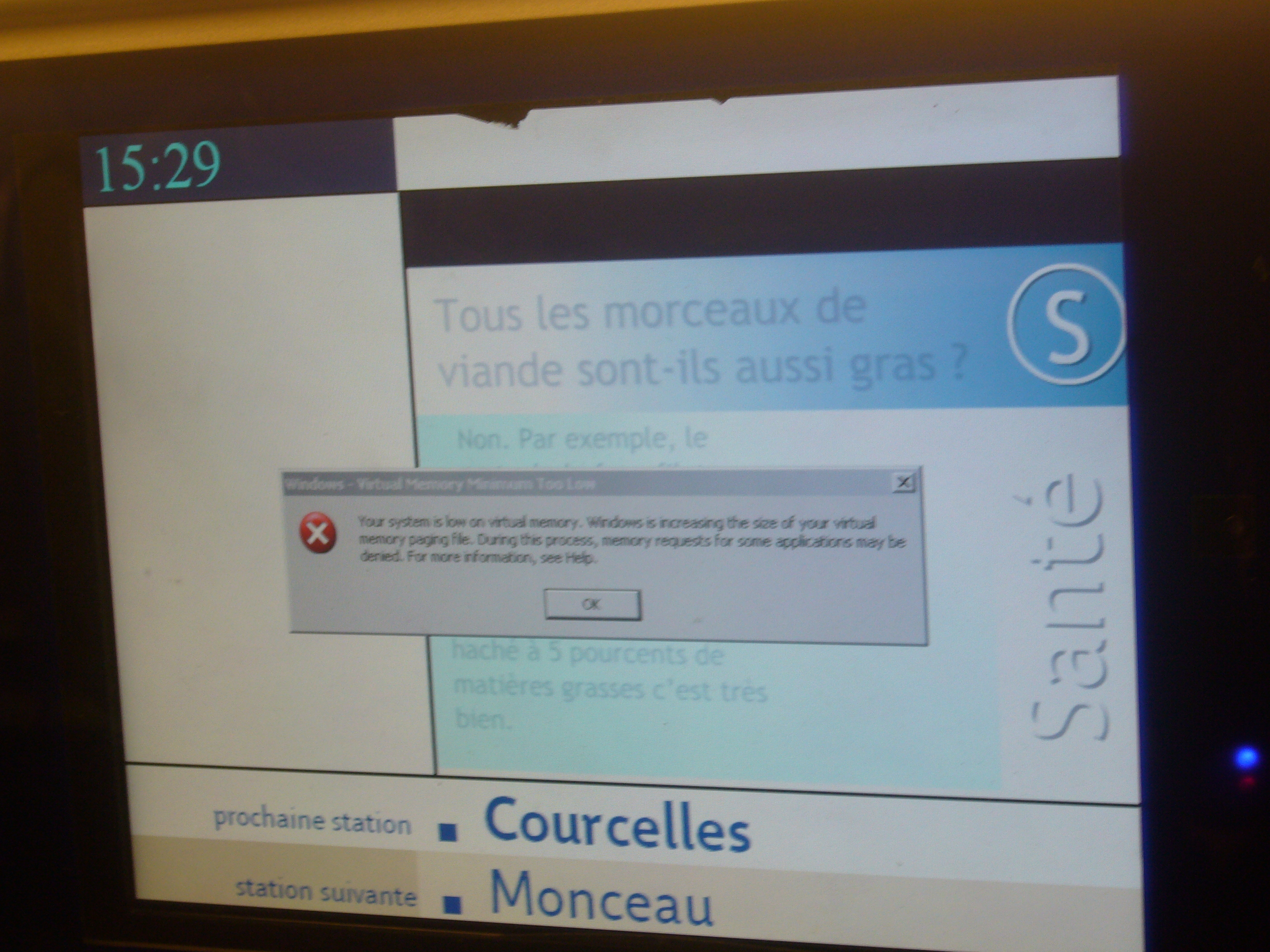
A Windows error on a Dilidam screen.

In the version of the system currently being used in the MF 01 train, the Dilidam system functions with the help of two computers running Windows XP Embedded. Each computer manages one half of the screens in the car.
