= MP 89 =

Paris Metro train

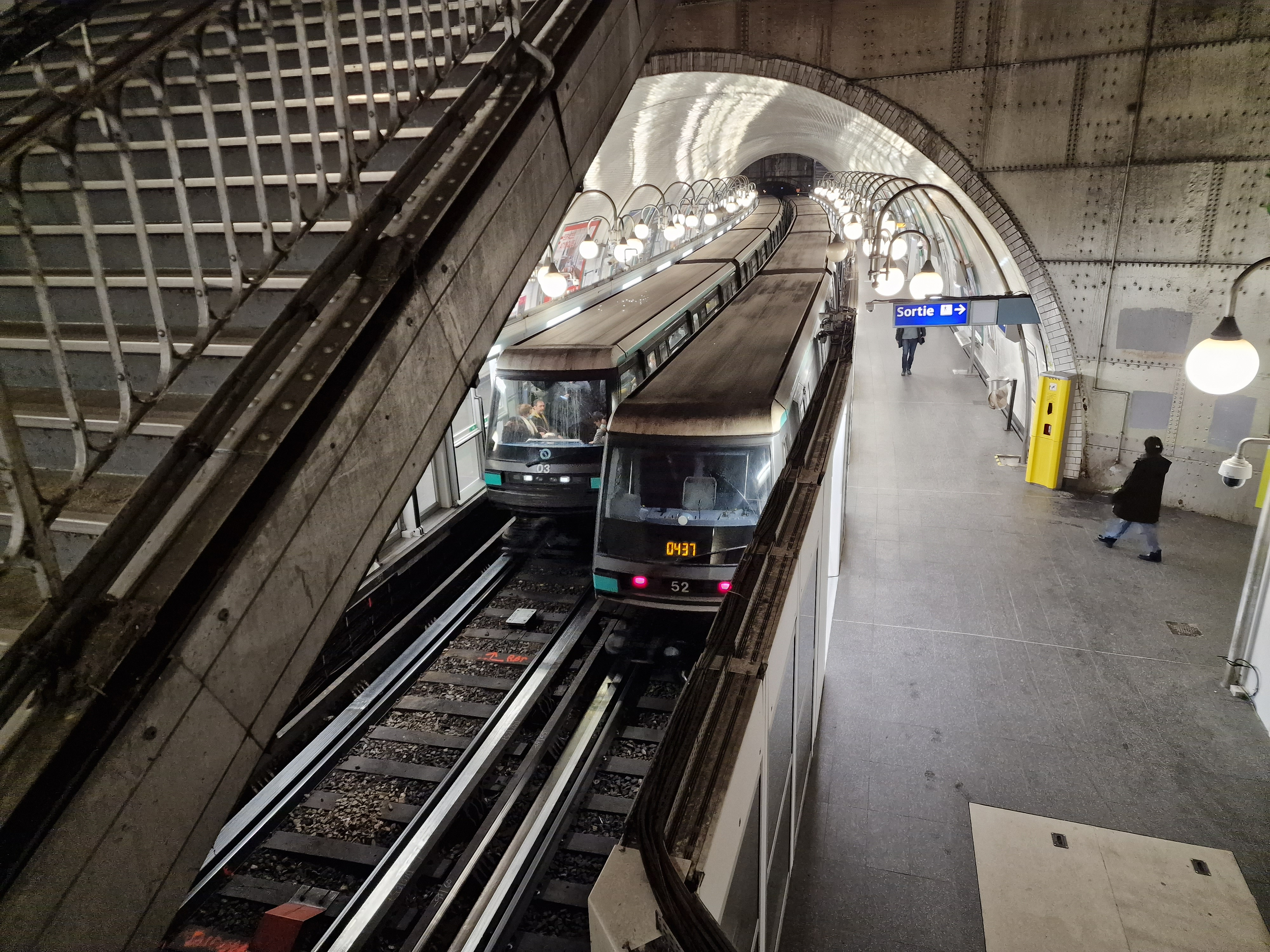
- MP 89 CA (left) and MP 89 CC (right) at Cité on Line 4.

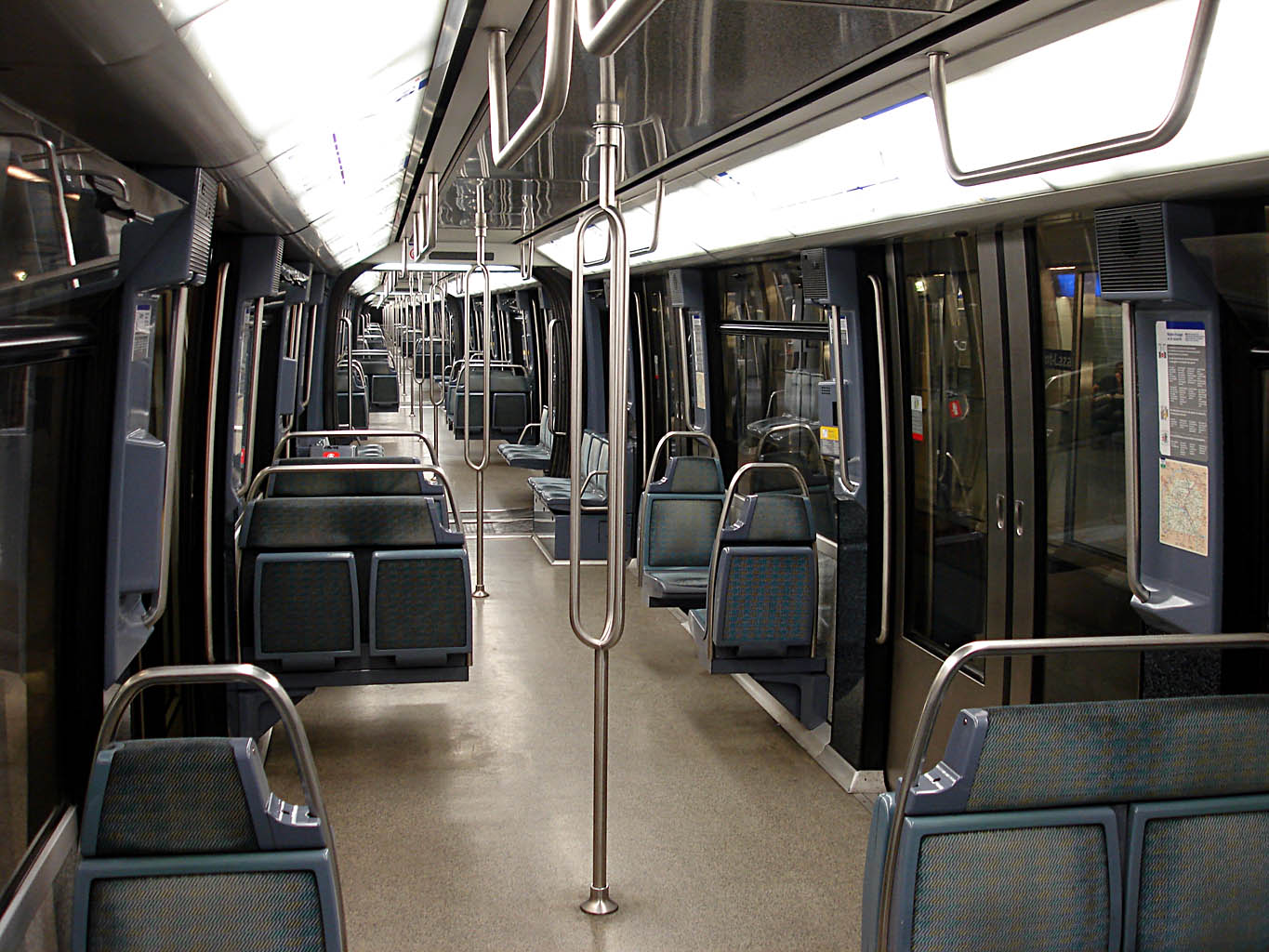
- Interior of MP 89 train
- In service: CC: 27 March 1997–present; CA: 15 October 1998–present
- Manufacturer: GEC Alsthom
- Family name: Metropolis
- Replaced: MP 59, MP 73
- Constructed: 1992–2001
- Number built: CC: 312 cars (52 trainsets); CA: 126 cars (21 trainsets)
- Formation: Line 4: 6 cars per trainset; Line 6: 5 cars per trainset
- Capacity: CC: 720 passengers, 242 seats; CA: 722 passengers, 210 seats
- Operator: RATP
- Line served: Paris Metro Paris Metro Line 4 Paris Metro Line 6

Specifications
- Car body construction: Aluminium
- Train length: 5-car sets: 75 m (246 ft 1 in); 6-car sets: 90 m (295 ft 3 in)
- Car length: 15 m (49 ft 3 in)
- Width: 2.45 m (8 ft 0 in)
- Height: 3.47 m (11 ft 5 in)
- Doors: 3 pairs per side, per car
- Maximum speed: CC: 70 km/h (43 mph); CA: 80 km/h (50 mph)
- Traction system: GEC-Alstom GTO–VVVF
- Traction motors: 3-phase AC induction motor type 4ELA 2848 C
- Power output: 2,000 kW (2,700 hp)
- Transmission: Elastic coupling, gear wheel and reduction gear wheel into the wheels Ratio : 9.113
- Acceleration: 4.8 km/(h⋅s) (3.0 mph/s)
- Deceleration: 6.4 km/(h⋅s) (4.0 mph/s) (emergency brake)
- Electric systems: Guide bar, 750 V DC
- Current collection: Contact shoes, side running on the vertical face of the guide bars
- Bogies: Type CL449
- Braking systems: Electrodynamic, regenerative, disc,
- Coupling system: Scharfenberg type
- Track gauge: 1,435 mm (4 ft 8 1/2 in) standard gauge, with running pads for the rubber tired wheels outside of the steel rails

The MP 89 (French: Métro Pneu appel d'offres de 1989; English: Rubber-tyred metro ordered in 1989) is a rubber tired variant of electric multiple units used on the Paris Metro. Designed by Roger Tallon, two types were built by Alstom for service on Lines 4 and 14, and began service on Line 6. The trains on Line 1 were moved to Line 4 between 2011 and 2013 to replace the older MP 59s, though only 48 trains are used for revenue service. The remaining four trains are stored either at Montrouge or Saint Ouen as operational spares.

== Description ==
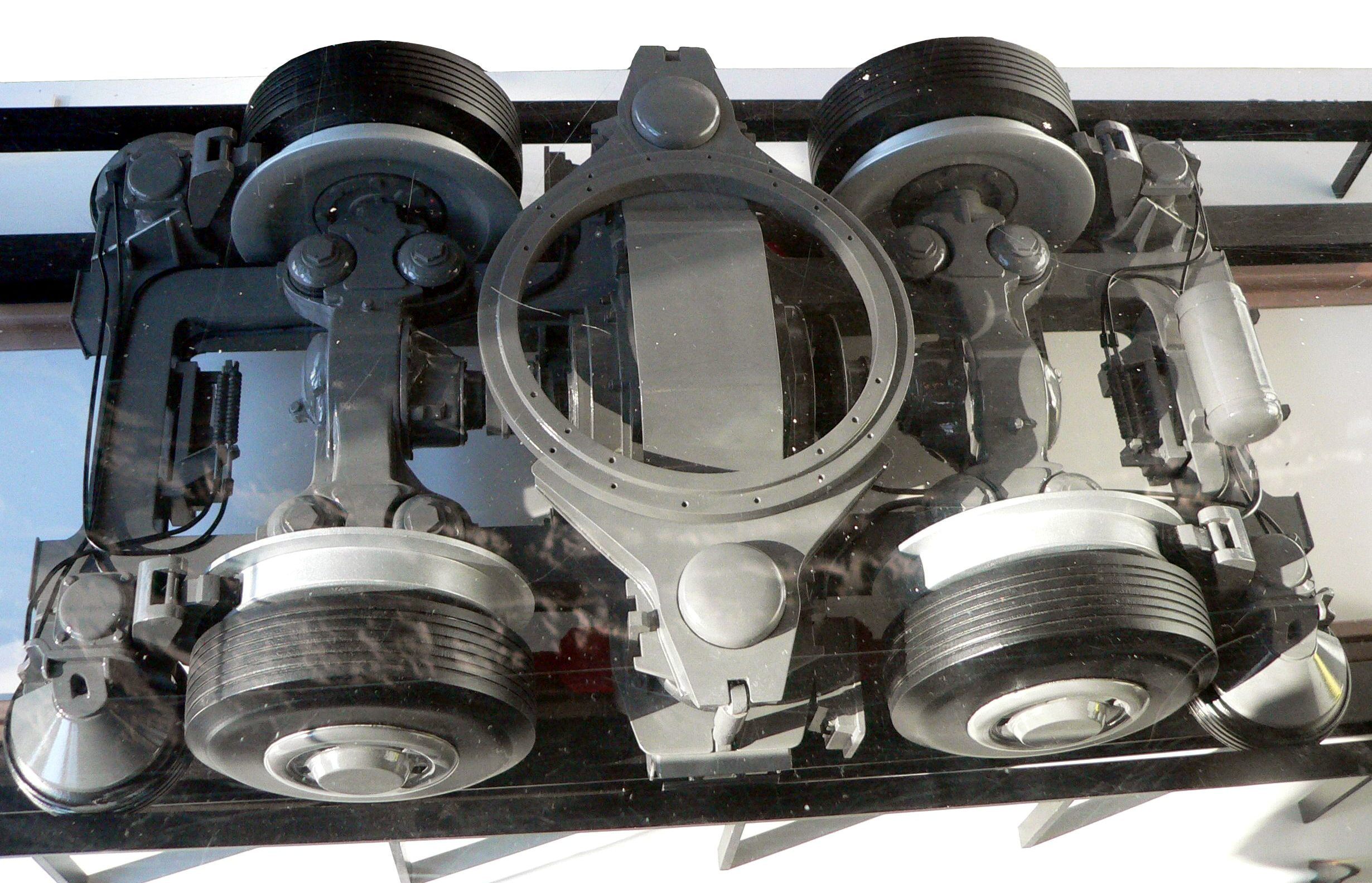
Bogie from an MP 89 Paris Metro rolling stock showing the two special wheelsets

Automated station announcements of the MP 89 CC as it arrives at station Marcadet-Poissonniers

The MP 89 contains many features that are equipped in both subclasses. These innovative features made the MP 89 the first of its kind on the Metro and allowed the RATP to continue to equip its lines with the modernized stock.

Among many features, the MP 89 is the first class of rolling stock to include the automatic opening and closing of doors. Instead of a passenger having to pull a lever or push a button to open the door in order to enter or exit the train, all of the doors on the platform side open and close automatically. This is due to the fact that the lines using this material are predominantly underground. This feature was carried on by the MF 01 and MP 05 rolling stock, and was also applied to the refurbished MF 77 trains running on line 13.

The MP 89 is also equipped with an audio and visual automatic system (AVSA Annonces Visuelles et Sonores Automatiques) which automatically detects the positioning of the station platform (whether the platform is on the left, or on the right side of the train). This detection allows the automatic opening of the train doors on the appropriate side of the platform. The system also allows for the operation of automated station announcements. Instead of the conductor having to utilize the intercom to announce station names, the automated system does this automatically. On curved stations, this system is especially vital due to the gap between the train and the curved platform. Automated messages announce the presence of the curves.

For example; if an MP 89 CC train approaches the curved station of Barbès–Rochechouart on Line 4, there will be an automated announcement of the station name "Barbès–Rochechouart" just prior to the train entering the station. As the train approaches the platform and begins to slow down, a second station name announcement "Barbès–Rochechouart" is made. In the case that a platform is curved, a third announcement is made in French, English, and a third language (usually Spanish, German, or Italian) that alerts passengers to "Please mind the gap between the train and platform". The MP 89 CA does not utilize "mind the gap" announcements at the present time because none of the platforms on Line 14 are curved.

Another new feature of the MP 89 is the interconnecting gangways in between cars, which was previously achieved with the prototype BOA and later the MF 88. This is described further in the next section, because the type of gangway equipped differs between the CC (SIG-Hübner) and CA (Paulstra) versions. The gangways were subsequently improved and equipped the later MF 2000 and MP 05 stock trains. (from fr:MP 89).

=== Manually driven (CC) stock (Line 4 and 6) ===
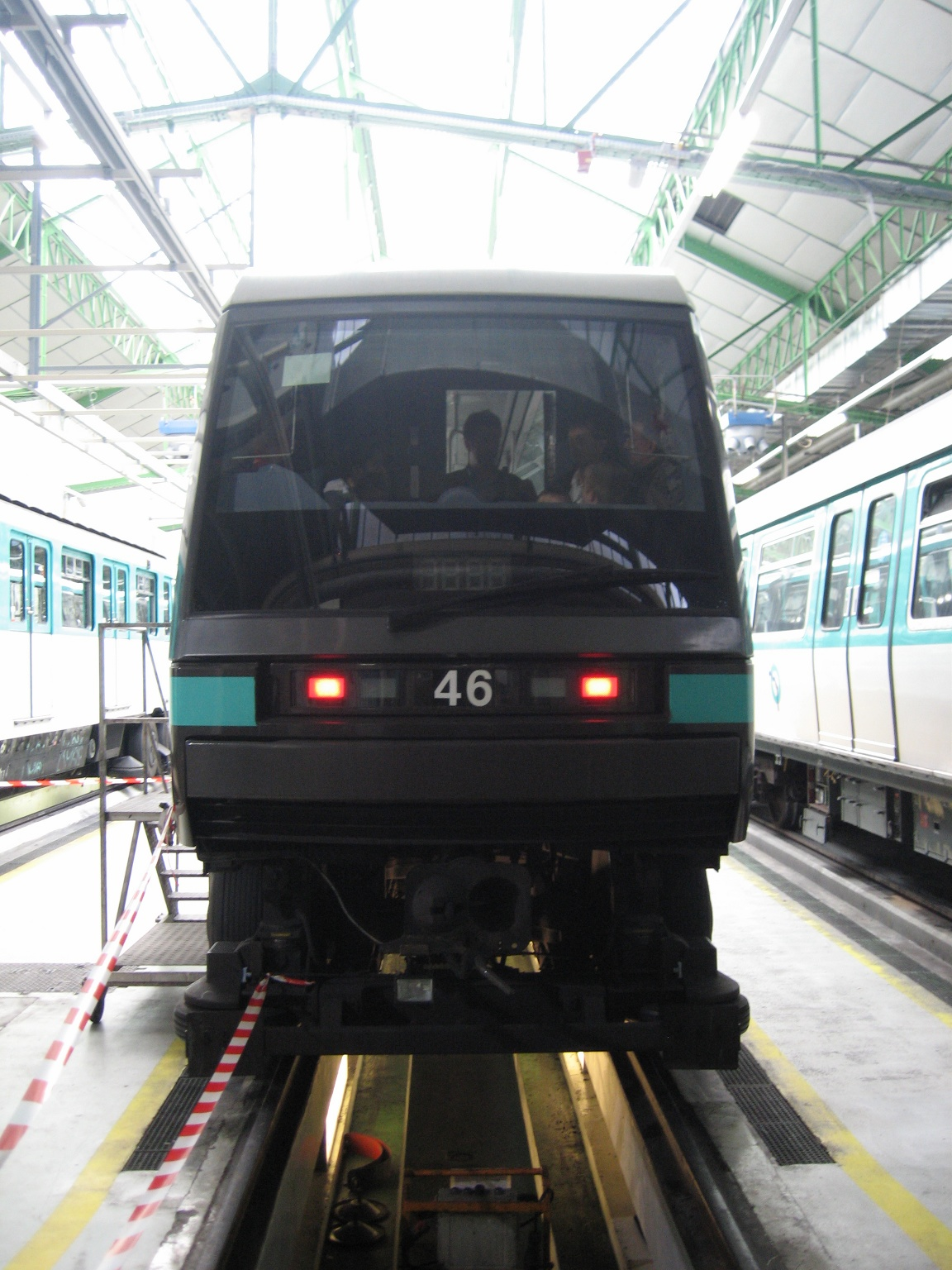
MP 89CC #46 at the St. Ouen shops

Sound of the start of an MP89 CA outdoors (L14)

Sound of the arrival of an MP89 CA indoors (L14)

Sound of the complete journey (departure, full speed-80kph, and arrival), between St Lazare and Pont Cardinet in the Ca19, on line 14

The MP 89 CC is manually controlled by the driver and originally circulated on Line 1 from their inception in 1997 until February 2013, replacing the aging MP 59 during the course of 1997 and 2000. The first train (#01) was delivered to the RATP in 1995 and was originally without articulation. Interconnecting gangways would not be installed until the train went into passenger service in 1997. 52 6-car trains were ordered for Line 1.

From 2006 to 2007, an experimental program ran on selected train-sets on an LCD passenger information system (Dilidam). This system would later be adopted by the new MP 05 automated rolling stock that now operate on Line 1 (from fr:MP 89).

Besides the provision of a driver's cab on the CC version of the MP 89, another key difference between the CC and CA stock is the interconnecting gangways between trains. Most of the CC stock are equipped with reinforced gangways, which consists of solid interior panels. This was designed mainly due to fears that the curved platforms on Line 1 (such as Bastille), as well as storage of the trains within the tunnels, could cause significant damage to rubber gangways. However, some trains (#s 02, 08, 09, 13, 18, 51, and 52) have been fitted with rubber gangways since 2000, and six trains (#s 43, 45, 46, 48, 49, and 50) contain prototype gangways that were later implemented in the MF 01 stock (from fr:MP 89). In 2012, train #12 was retrofitted with the MF 01 type gangways upon transfer of the train to Line 4, and in March 2014 train #01 was retrofitted.

Because Line 4 is a much curvier line compared to Line 1, there were also concerns that the interconnecting gangways would become damaged from excessive wear and tear caused by the curvature of the tracks and stations. It was originally planned that all of the MP 89 CC trains would be re-fitted with the same rubber gangways as the MP 05. However, after modifying the Line 4 tracks to better suit the MP 89, the plan was cancelled.

== Transfer of (CC) stock to Line 4 ==
Beginning in April 2011, and lasting through March 2013, the MP 89 trainsets on Line 1 were gradually transferred over to Line 4. This cascading process was initiated by the full automation of Line 1, which brought on board a new class of fully automated rolling stock, the MP 05. This, in turn, allowed the aging MP 59 trainsets on Line 4 to be retired.

In April 2011 the MP 89 CC #01 was moved to Line 4, as work to fully automate Line 1 was nearing completion. The transfer of these trains to Line 4 allowed RATP to retire the MP 59 stock, which were reaching the ends of their useful lives. After various internal components (such as the automated station announcements) were updated to accommodate service on Line 4, train #01 went into service on 23 May 2011. Until September 2011 train #01 was the only MP 89CC train to operate on Line 4. On 10 September 2011 train #44 went into service, marking the second train to be transferred. As the new MP 05 rolling stock began to debut on Line 1 during November 2011, more MP 89 stock was put into service, allowing the RATP to transfer two to three trains per month.

By 21 December 2012 Line 1 had reached 100% automation, though three MP 89 trains, #s 02, 46, and 50, continued to operate as supplemental trains during rush hour. As of 21 February 2013 the MP 89 are no longer used on Line 1 and the MP 05 trains are now fully controlled by the central command centre and train spacing (SAET) instead of the signaling system that guided the MP 89 trains.

As of June 2013 all 52 trains have been transferred over to Line 4. However, only 48 trains are used for revenue service (just as the MP 59s were). The remaining four trains are stored at either the garage behind the Mairie de Montrouge station, or at the Saint Ouen workshop as operational spares.

== Transfer of (CA) stock to Line 4 ==
New trains of the MP 14 series will replace the current fleet of Line 14, because of the extensions of the Grand Paris Express project. The current fleet of 21 MP 89 CA and 11 MP 05 trains will transfer to the newly-automated Line 4, where it will be joined by 20 MP 14 trains to meet the current peak vehicle requirements. The MP 89 CA trains entered service on Line 4 in September 2022 along with the MP 05 and MP 14 trains.

== Transfer of (CC) stock to Line 6 ==
The 52 MP 89 CC trains that currently serve Line 4 would then be shortened from six to five cars, and transfer to Line 6 to replace the MP 73 trains. Line 6 currently has 47 MP 73 trains, meaning that Île-de-France Mobilités would be able to immediately start refurbishment on five MP 89 CC trains when they are released from service.

For the transfer from the line to the, there are several modifications to be made, such as:

- Integrating the specific equipment kits predefined and supplied by the holder of the dedicated contract
- Integrating RATP equipment, Octys (improved autopilot) and video protection systems
- Replacing all the seat upholstery
- Carrying out all electronic and electrical transformation operations
- Renovating the ceilings
- Carrying out the installation of the IDFM logos and on-board signalisation
- Carrying out functional tests (in progress for 4 trainsets)

For the transfer, only the technical modifications will be carried out. The aesthetic modifications and the modifications will be later. The RATP changing the 52 trainsets into 5 cars will be able to carry out the renovation of 2 or 3 trains at a time without degrading the operation of the M6, reserves included.

The MP 89 CC trains entered service on Line 6 in January 2023.

== Formations ==
=== MP89 CC ===
use trains in a 5-car formation (3M2T).

As of 1 July 2024, 52 five-car sets are allocated to Place d’Italie depot for use on Line 6.

	<- Étoile Nation ->				
Car No.	1	2	3	4	5
Type	T	M	M	M	T
Designation	89 S xxx (even number)	89 N1 xxx (even number)	89 N2 xxx (even number)	82 N2 xxx (odd number)	89 S xxx (odd number)
equipement	CP, SIV	VVVF	VVVF	VVVF	CP, SIV

The last set, which is six cars long, is unassigned.

=== MP89 CA ===
use driverless trains in a 6-car formation (4M2T).

As of 4 May 2023, 21 six-car sets are allocated to Saint-Ouen Depot for use on Line 4.

	<- P^{te} de Clignancourt Bagneux ->					
Car No.	1	2	3	4	5	6
Type	T	M	M	M	M	T
Designation	89 S1 xxx (even number)	89 N1 xxx (even number)	89 N2 xxx (even number)	82 N2 xxx (odd number)	89 N1 xxx (odd number)	89 S1 xxx (odd number)
equipement	CP, SIV	VVVF	VVVF	VVVF	VVVF	CP, SIV

used driverless trains in a 6-car formation (4M2T).

24 March 2023 marked the last day of the MP89 CA on line 14, which lost its original rolling stock.

	<- Saint-Ouen Olympiades ->					
Car No.	1	2	3	4	5	6
Type	T	M	M	M	M	T
Designation	89 S1 xxx (even number)	89 N1 xxx (even number)	89 N2 xxx (even number)	82 N2 xxx (odd number)	89 N1 xxx (odd number)	89 S1 xxx (odd number)
equipement	CP, SIV	VVVF	VVVF	VVVF	VVVF	CP, SIV

== Other networks ==
A version of the MP 89 CA has been operating on line M2 of the Lausanne Metro since 2008. Designated MP 89 TL, or Be 8/8 TL internally, these are two-car trains instead of the six-car trains variant used in Paris.

The Santiago Metro uses a forked CC version named NS 93. These trains are essentially an upgraded version of the MP 89 trains, and operate in six and seven-car formations on the line 5 and eight-car formations on the line 1. The NS 93 is noticeably taller than the MP 89, to accommodate air conditioning.

== Gallery ==
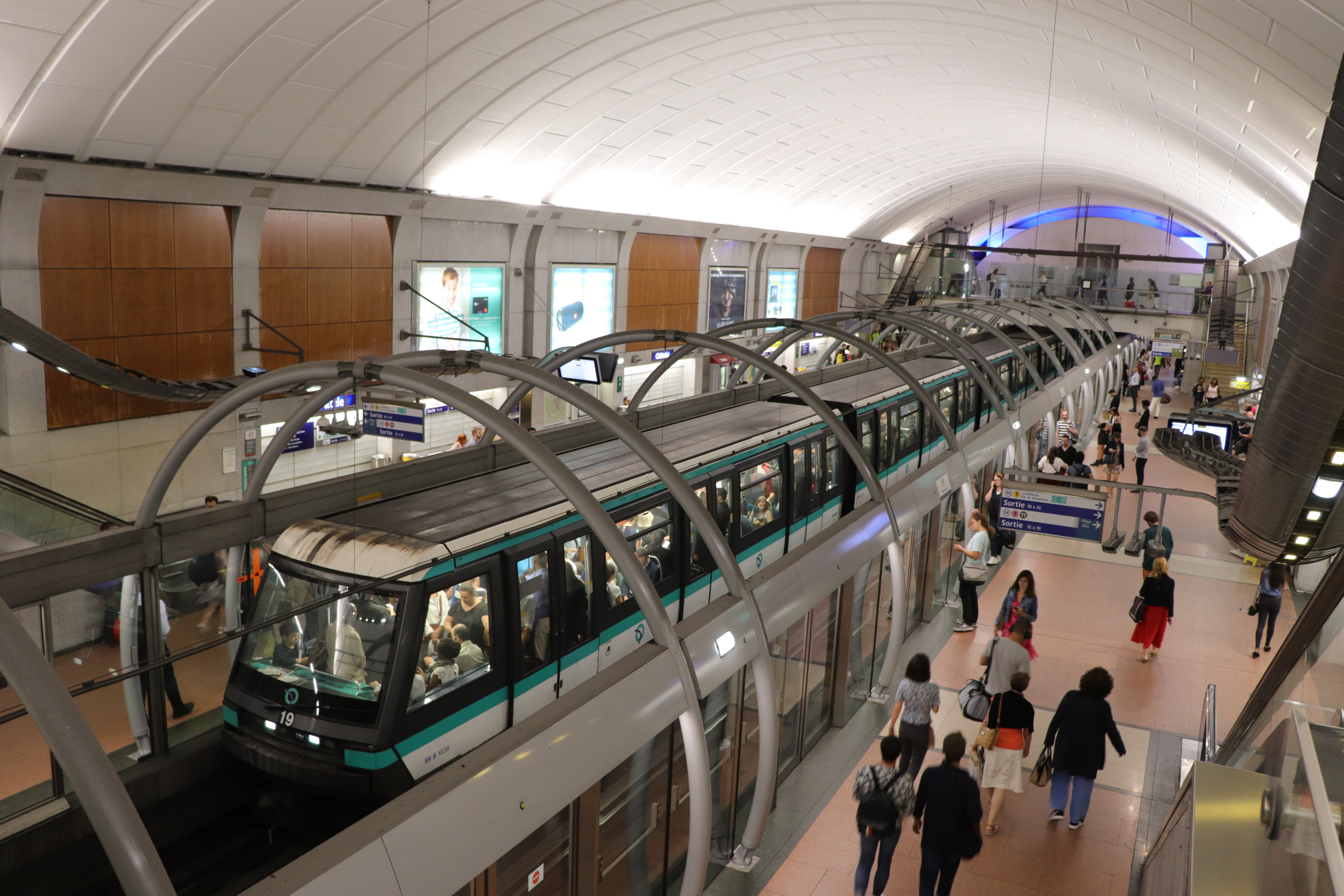
MP 89 CA on Line 14 (2019)

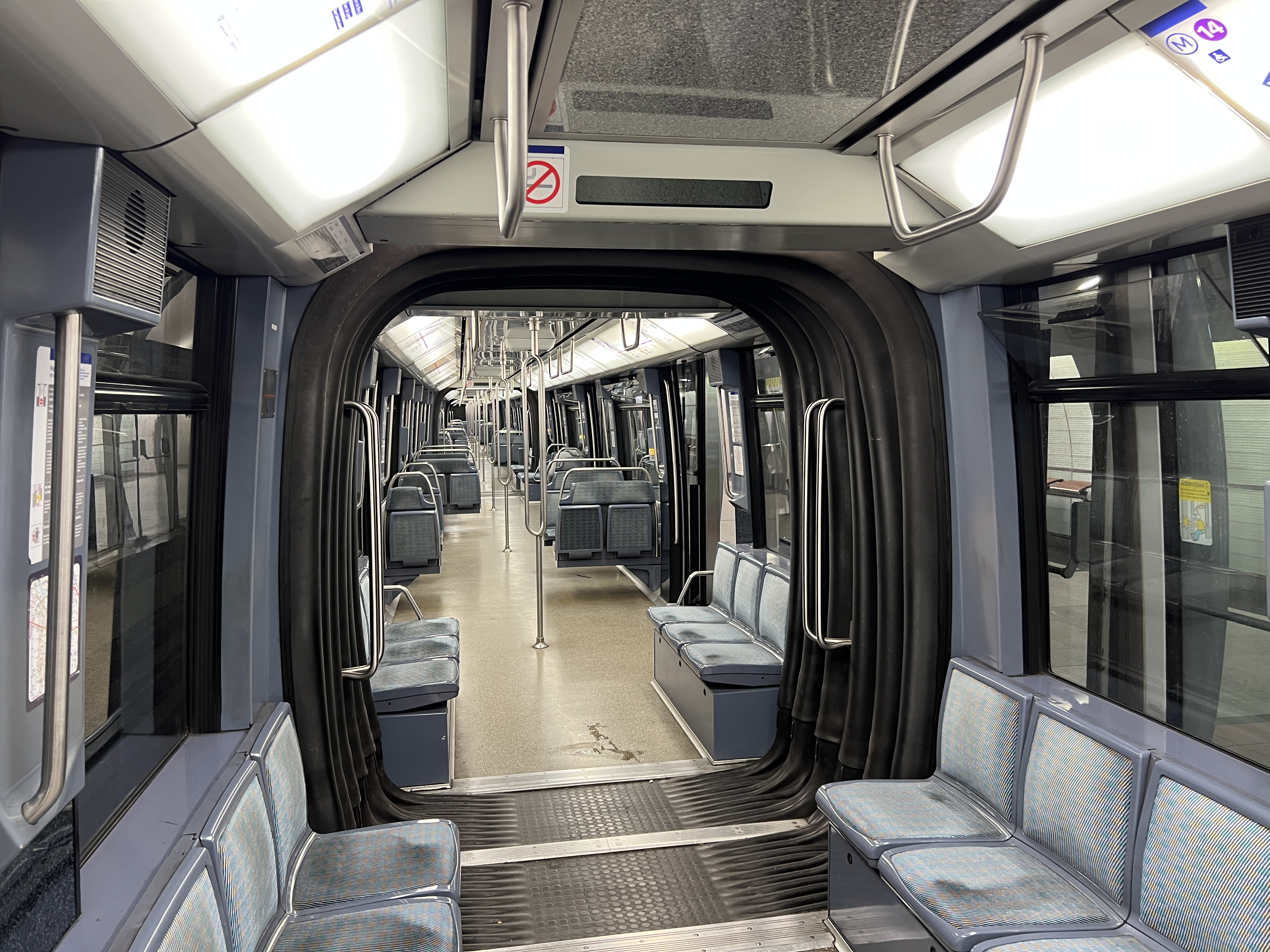
Interior

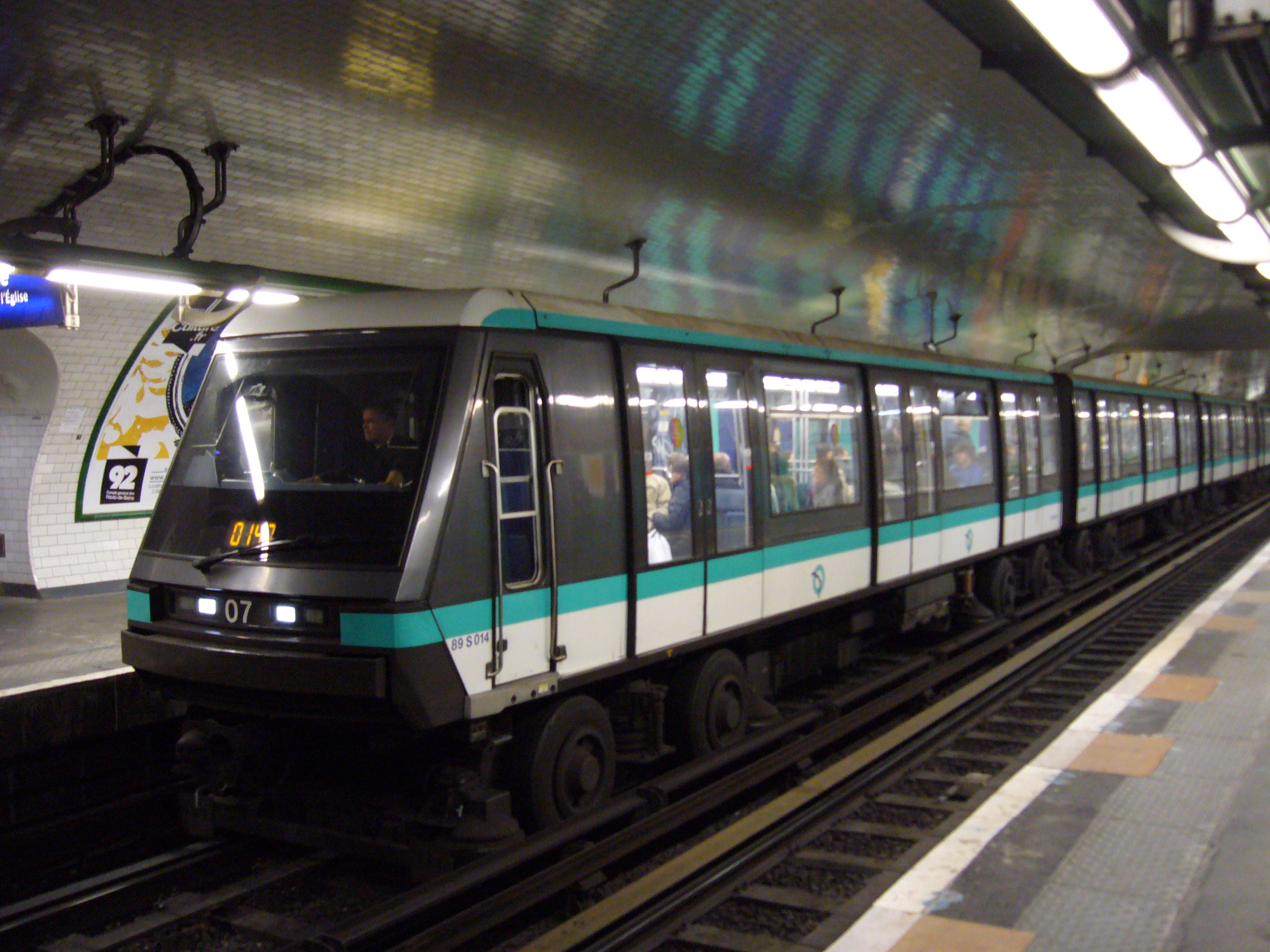
MP 89 CC on Line 1 (2009)

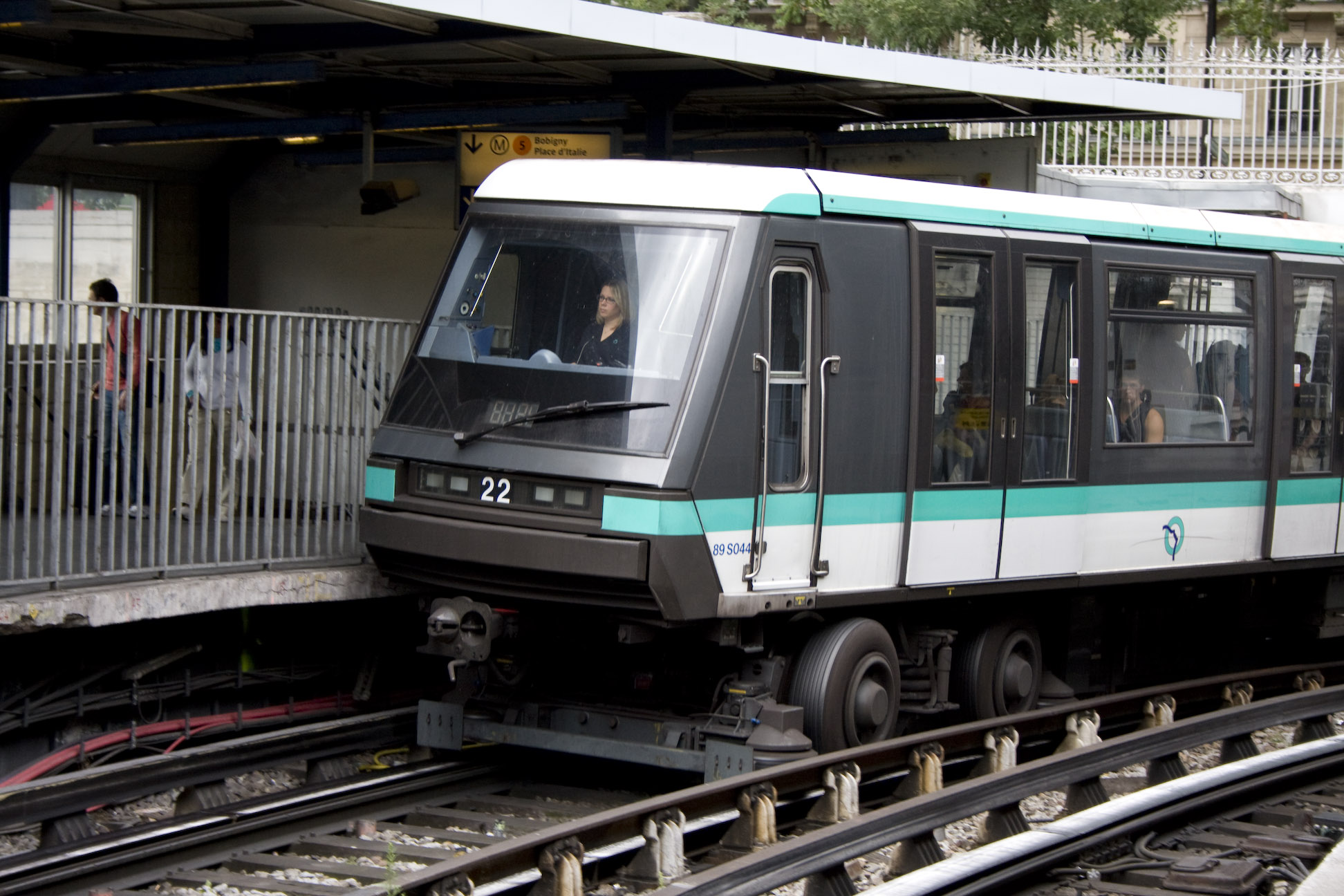
MP 89 CC at Bastille station (2008)

MP 89CC #48 at Kléber station

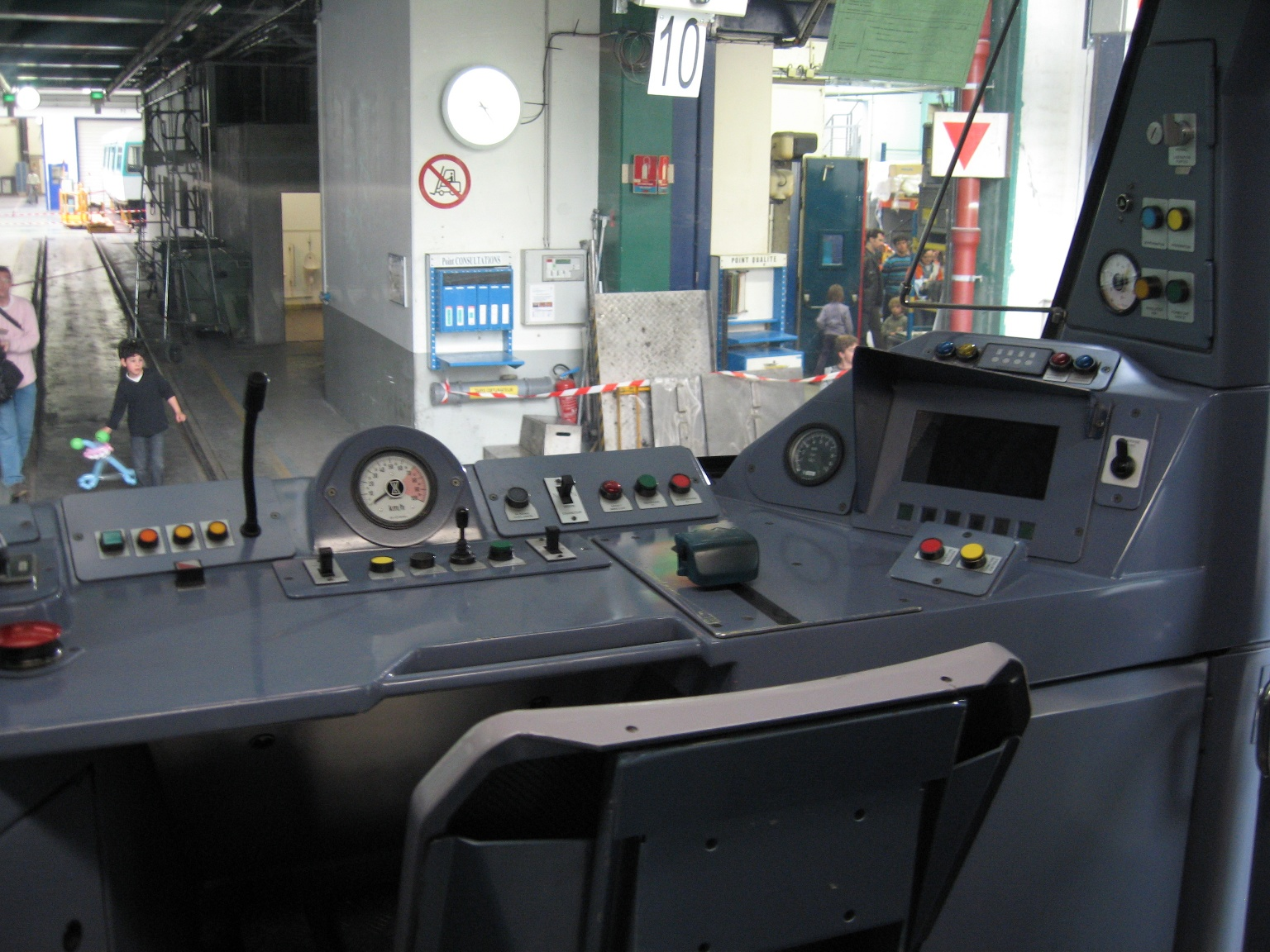
Cabin of the MP 89CC
