= MF 01 =

Paris Metro train

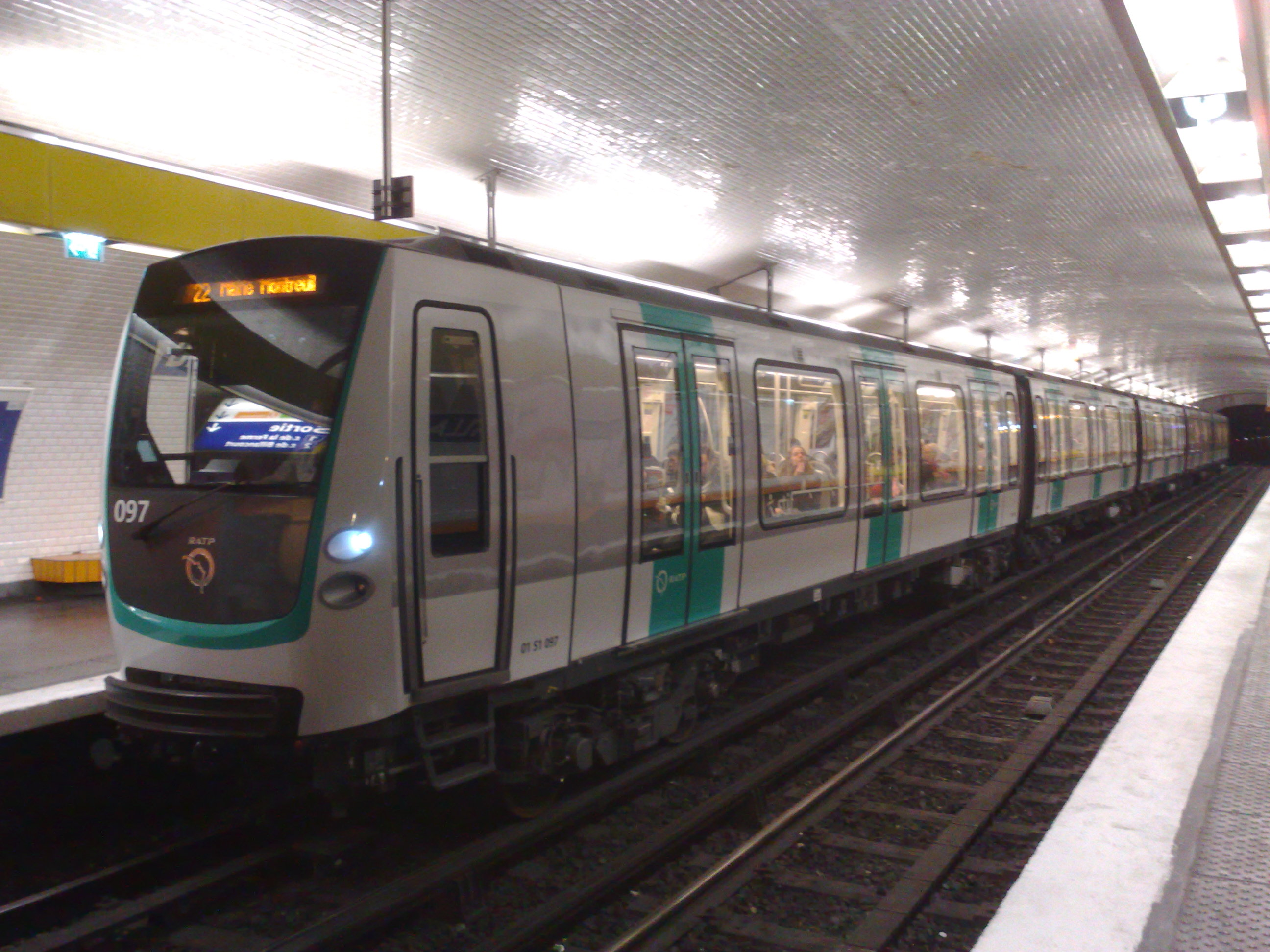
- MF 01 trainset at Billancourt on Line 9

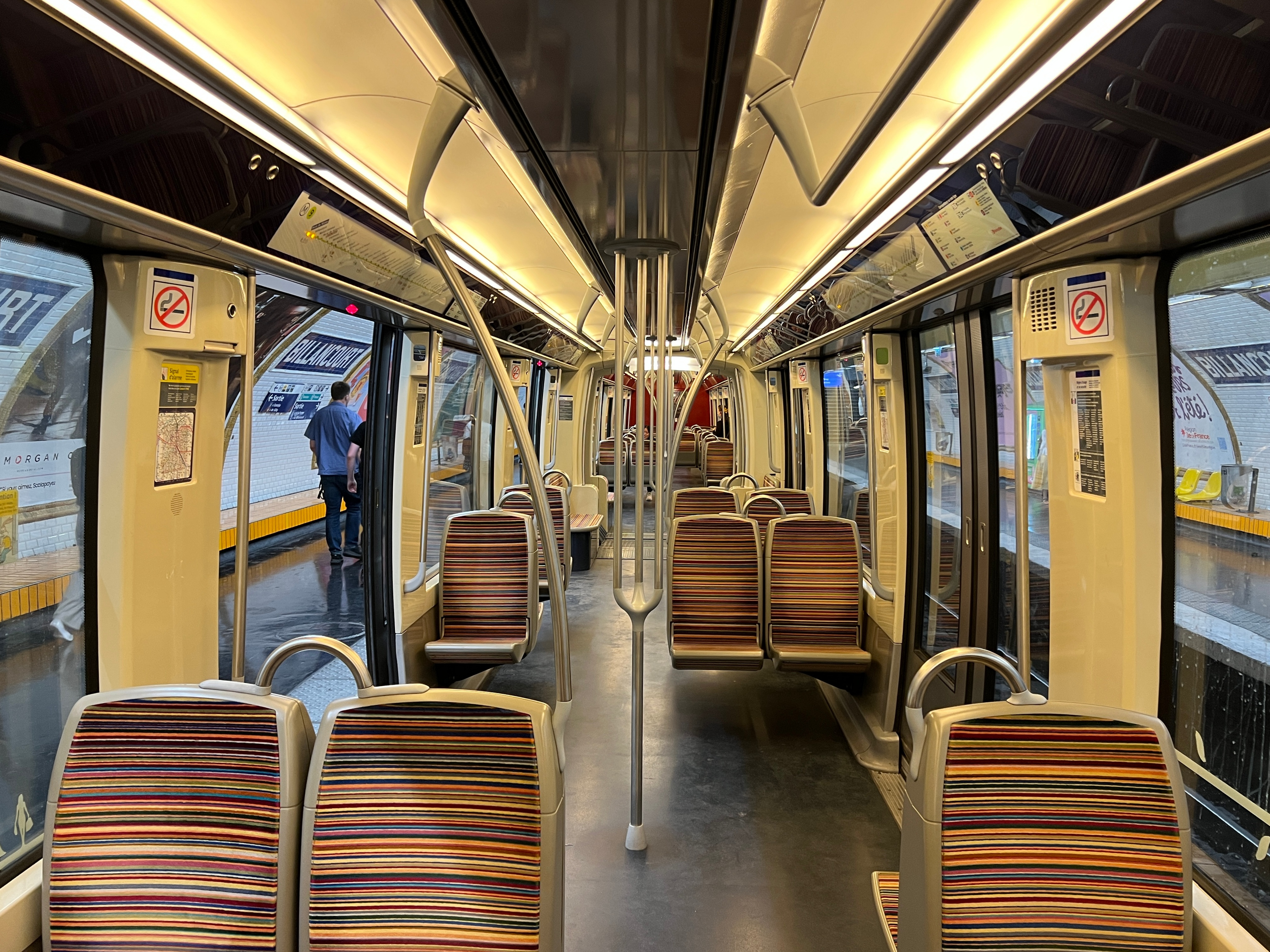
- Interior of an MF 01 trainset
- In service: 11 June 2008–present
- Manufacturers: Alstom, Bombardier, Technicatome, CSEE Transport
- Family name: Metropolis
- Replaced: MF 67
- Constructed: 2007–2016
- Entered service: 11 June 2008
- Number built: 865 cars (173 trainsets)
- Formation: 5 cars per trainset
- Capacity: 557 per train
- Operator: RATP
- Line served: Paris Metro Paris Metro Line 2 Paris Metro Line 5 Paris Metro Line 9

Specifications
- Car body construction: Steel
- Train length: 75 m (246 ft 1 in)
- Car length: 15 m (49 ft 3 in)
- Width: 2.40 m (7 ft 10 in)
- Height: 3.47 m (11 ft 5 in)
- Doors: 2 × 3 62 inch pairs per car
- Maximum speed: 70 km/h (43 mph)
- Weight: 125.7 t (277,000 lb)
- Traction system: Alstom OniX IGBT–VVVF; Alstom AGATE control system
- Traction motors: 12 × 103 kW (138 hp) 3-phase AC induction motor
- Power output: 1,236 kW (1,658 hp)
- Transmission: 1:7.28 ratio
- Acceleration: 0.95 m/s (3.1 ft/s)
- Deceleration: Emergency: 1.3 m/s^{2} (4.3 ft/s^{2}); Service: 1.1 m/s^{2} (3.6 ft/s^{2})
- Electric systems: 750 V DC third rail
- Current collection: Contact shoe
- UIC classification: 2′2′+Bo′Bo′+Bo′Bo′+Bo′Bo′+2′2′
- Braking systems: Electrodynamic, regenerative, disc
- Track gauge: 1,435 mm (4 ft 8 1/2 in) standard gauge

The MF 01 (French: Métro Fer appel d'offres de 2001; English: Steel-wheeled metro ordered in 2001; also called MF 2000 from its year of its invitation to tender) is a model of steel-wheeled electrical multiple units used on the Paris Metro. The cars first arrived in December 2007 and delivery was completed in 2015. RATP ordered 160 trains or 800 cars in 2001, to replace the aging MF 67. It is used on Lines 2, 5, and 9.

The MF 01 was first introduced to the press on 17 June 2005 but it would not be until January 2006 that the first trains would undergo testing on the system. Commercial service on Line 2 began on 11 June 2008, with all of Line 2 being equipped with the new rolling stock by March 2011. Testing quickly commenced on Line 5, where two trains were initially deployed. Commercial service on Line 5 began on 15 June 2011, with nearly 25 trains in service as of April 2012.

On 9 February 2011, the STIF voted to purchase MF 2000 stock for Line 9 at a cost of €330 million. Deliveries took place in 2013, after all of the stock was delivered to Line 5, and will continue through 2016. The features of the Line 9 trains will be virtually identical to the trains on Lines 2 and 5, including the air conditioning systems. However, the trains feature a new joint RATP/STIF exterior livery that is based on the MI 09 commuter rail rolling stock on the RER A, marking the first time that the co-branded RATP/STIF livery is seen on the Metro. The first train (#096) for Line 9 was delivered in June 2013 and began revenue service along Line 5 in July 2013. The train was then prepared for revenue service on Line 9 in early October 2013, going into revenue service on 21 October 2013.

== Conception ==
With many of the MF 67 trains approaching 35 years old on Lines 2, 5, and 9, the RATP determined that a new class of steel-wheel rolling stock was needed. Due to changes in European legislation regarding competition, the RATP was required to change the way it awarded bids. This resulted in the RATP launching an open bid where numerous firms could take part.

The winning consortium of four train manufacturers, namely Alstom, Bombardier, Technicatome and CSEE was chosen to manufacture the MF 2000 stock at a cost of €800 million. It was the first time in history that the RATP has assigned four manufacturers to manufacture different components of the train cars. This process delayed the delivery by a year due to poor collaboration between the four companies, but the RATP has seen a drop in costs.

== Description ==
The exterior design of the MF 01 was the result of a design competition, and the winning design is similar to the MP 89. The interior also looks similar to MP 89's interior, carrying on features like interconnecting gangways between cars, but with new security features added. The MF 01 is the first rolling stock type on the Paris Metro to feature a refrigerated ventilation system inside the driver's cabs and passenger interiors, specially designed for the Metro's restricted loading gauge, which consumes less electricity than traditional air-conditioning. Additionally, the MF 2000 consumes 30% less energy than its older counterparts due to innovations in traction and braking systems.

The Pre-production train #001 contains the Dilidam multimedia system. Although all of the MF 01 trains are configured in a way so that the system can easily be installed, high cost has delayed implementation to all trainsets. The same train, in August 2014, became the first set to be repainted in the hybrid RATP/STIF livery and was reassigned to Line 9, having originally ran on Line 2. In January 2022, set #001 was reassigned to the Gare du Nord USFRT where it is now used for training purposes.

== Deliveries to Line 9 ==
Unlike the previous deliveries of the MF 01 stock trains to Lines 2 and 5; deliveries to Line 9 consisted of placing trains into revenue service along Line 5 for a short time before being moved over to Line 9 for revenue service. The reconstruction of the Boulogne workshops along Line 9 prevented any mass cascading of rolling stock to occur, since the Auteuil workshops, which Line 10 temporarily shares with Line 9, are not equipped to handle maintenance operations for the MF 01 rolling stock, and thus heavy maintenance work was done at the Bobigny workshops along Line 5.

== Formations ==
In date of 25 December 2021:

- 173 MF 01 trainsets were in service and were formed as shown below, with three motored ("M") cars and two non-powered trailer ("T") cars.
- One trainset (Set #025) was withdrawn in 2017 following a derailment as it arrived at Barbès–Rochechouart station on 2 December 2016.

As of 1 March 2022, 45 trainsets are allocated to Charonne depot for use on Line 2, 52 trainsets are allocated to Bobigny Depot for use on Line 5, and 74 trainsets are allocated to Boulogne depot for use on Line 9.

	<- Porte Dauphine Nation ->				
	<- Bobigny Place d'Italie ->				
	<- Pont de Sèvres Montreuil ->				
Car No.	1	2	3	4	5
Type	T	M	M	M	T
Designation	01 S1 xxx (number trainset)	01 N1 xxx (number trainset)	01 N3 xxx number trainset)	01 N2 xxx (number trainset)	01 S2 xxx (number trainset)
Equipment	CP, SIV	VVVF	VVVF	VVVF	CP, SIV

- VVVF: Inverters OniX IGBT–VVVF
- CP: Air compressor
- SIV: Static inverter

== Gallery ==
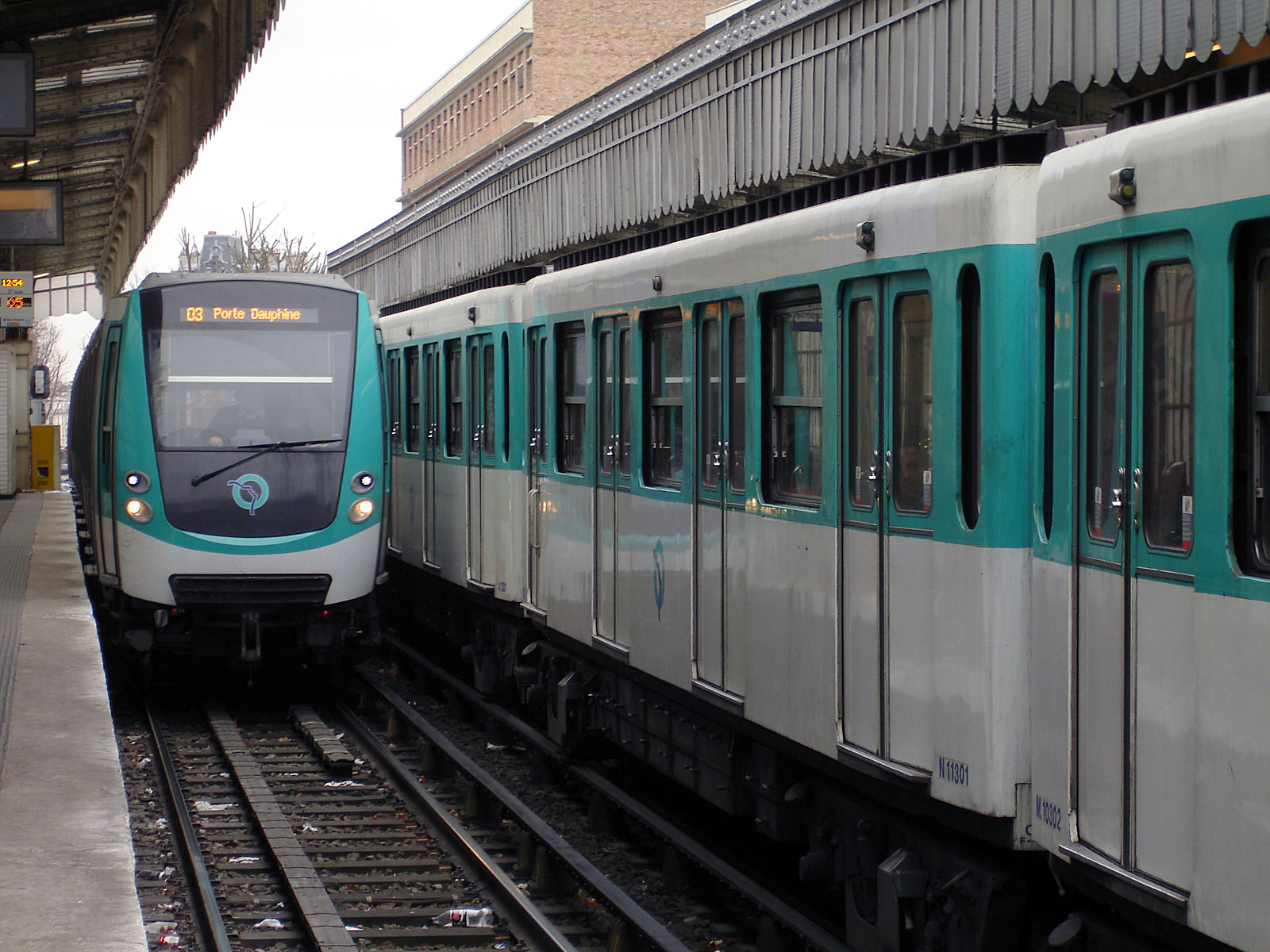
A MF 01 train passes a MF 67 at Jaurès

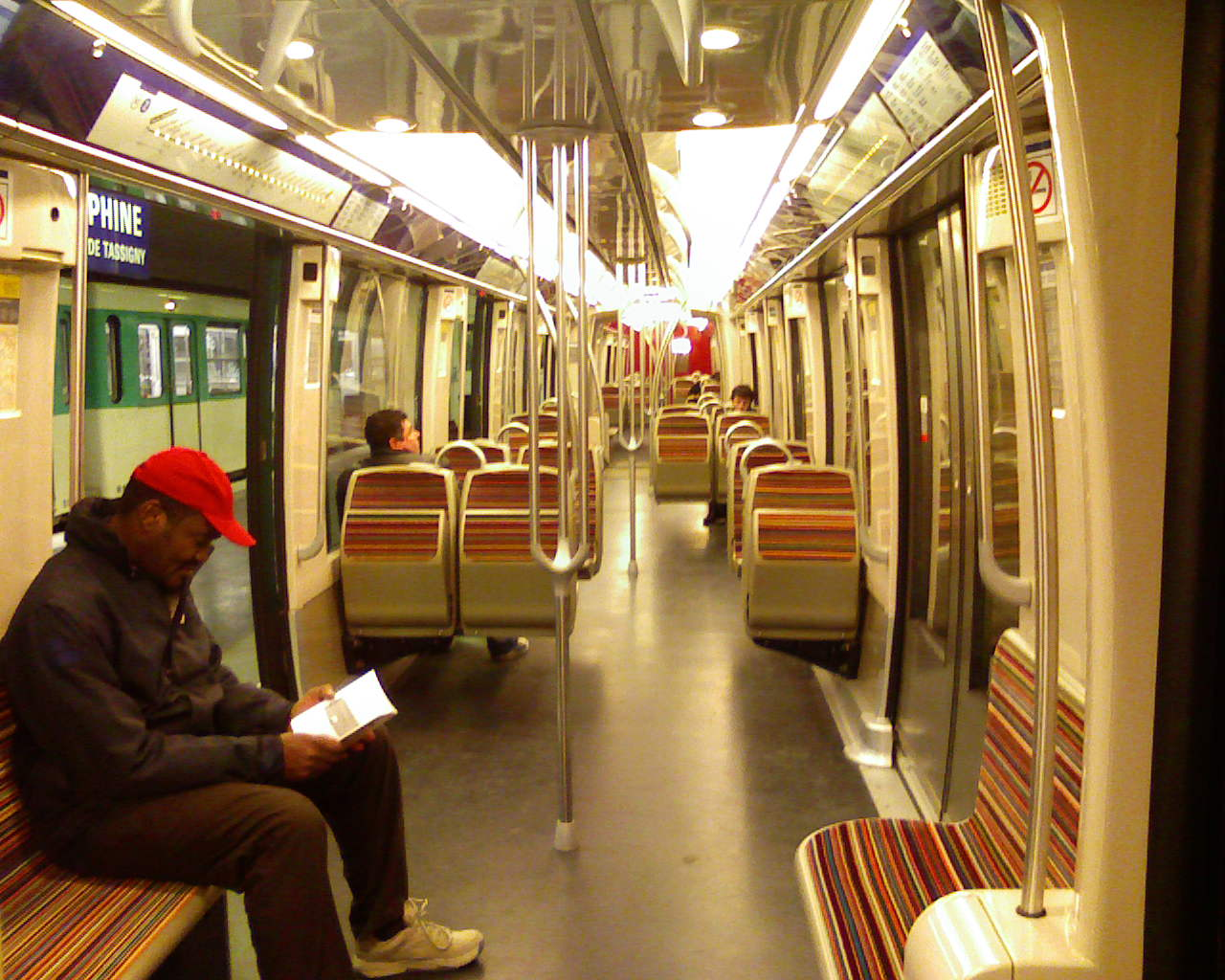
Interior

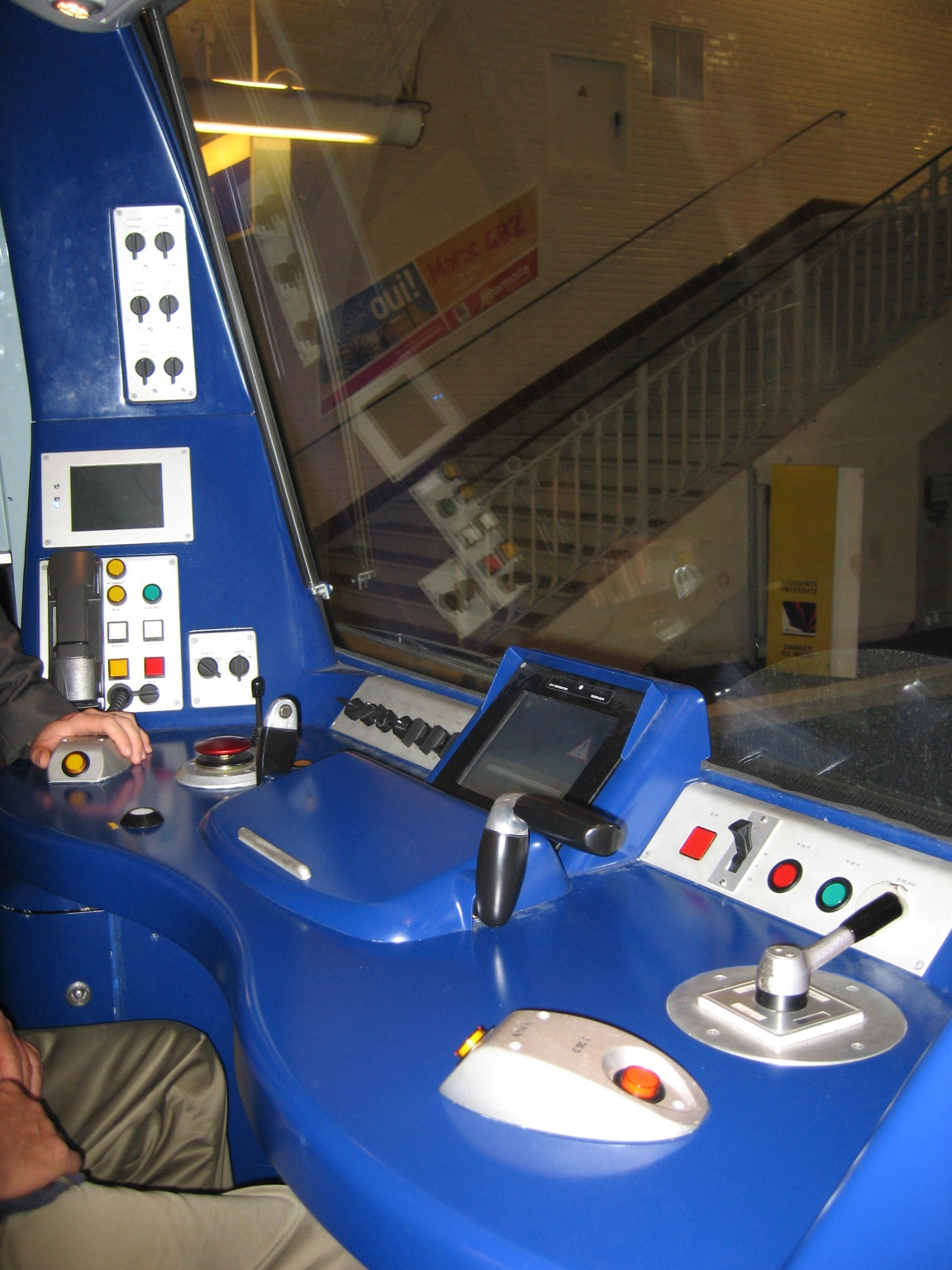
Driver's cab

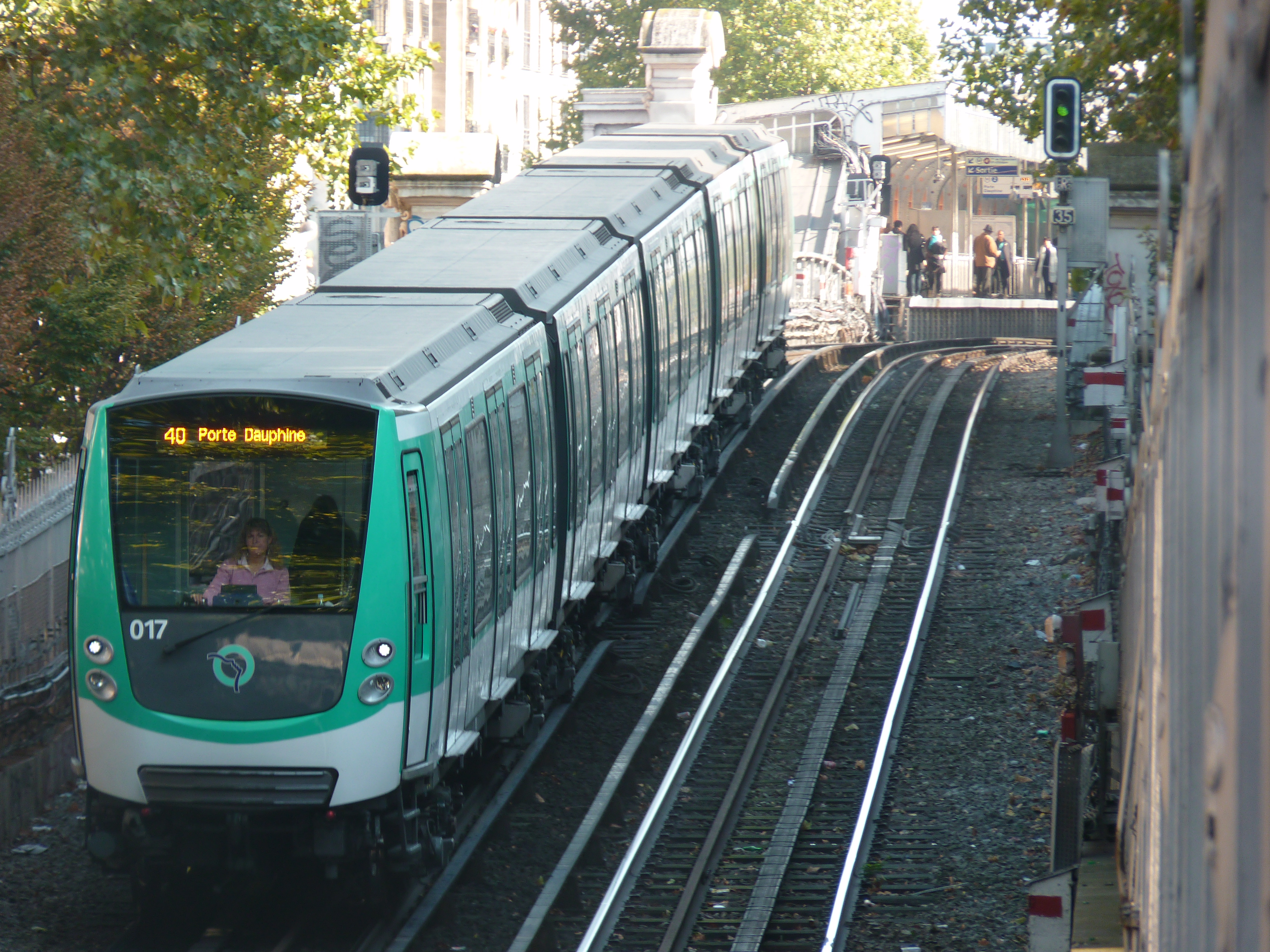
Train 017 leaving Barbes–Rochechouart towards Porte Dauphine

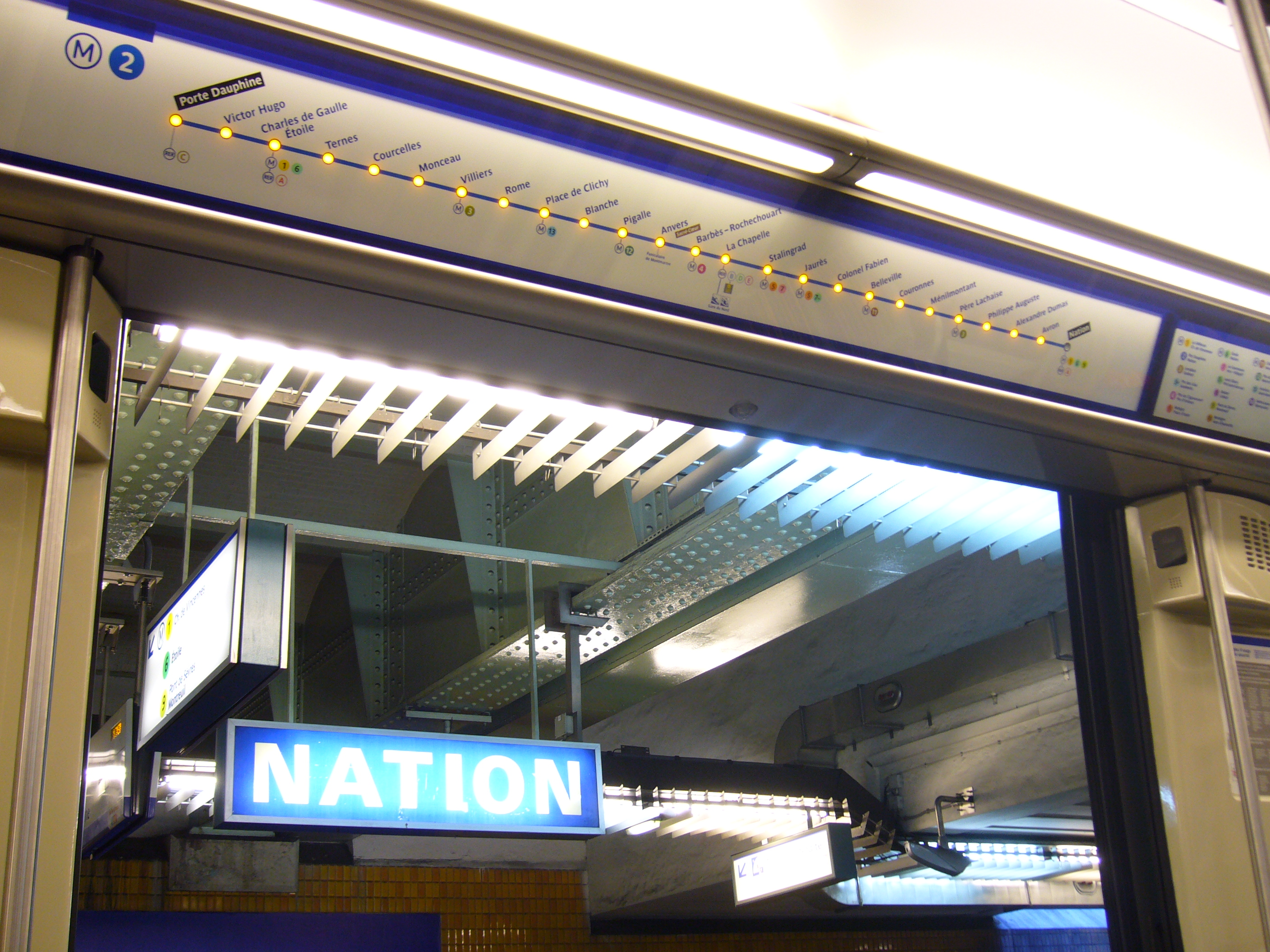
AVSA system for line map
