= History of parks and gardens of Paris =

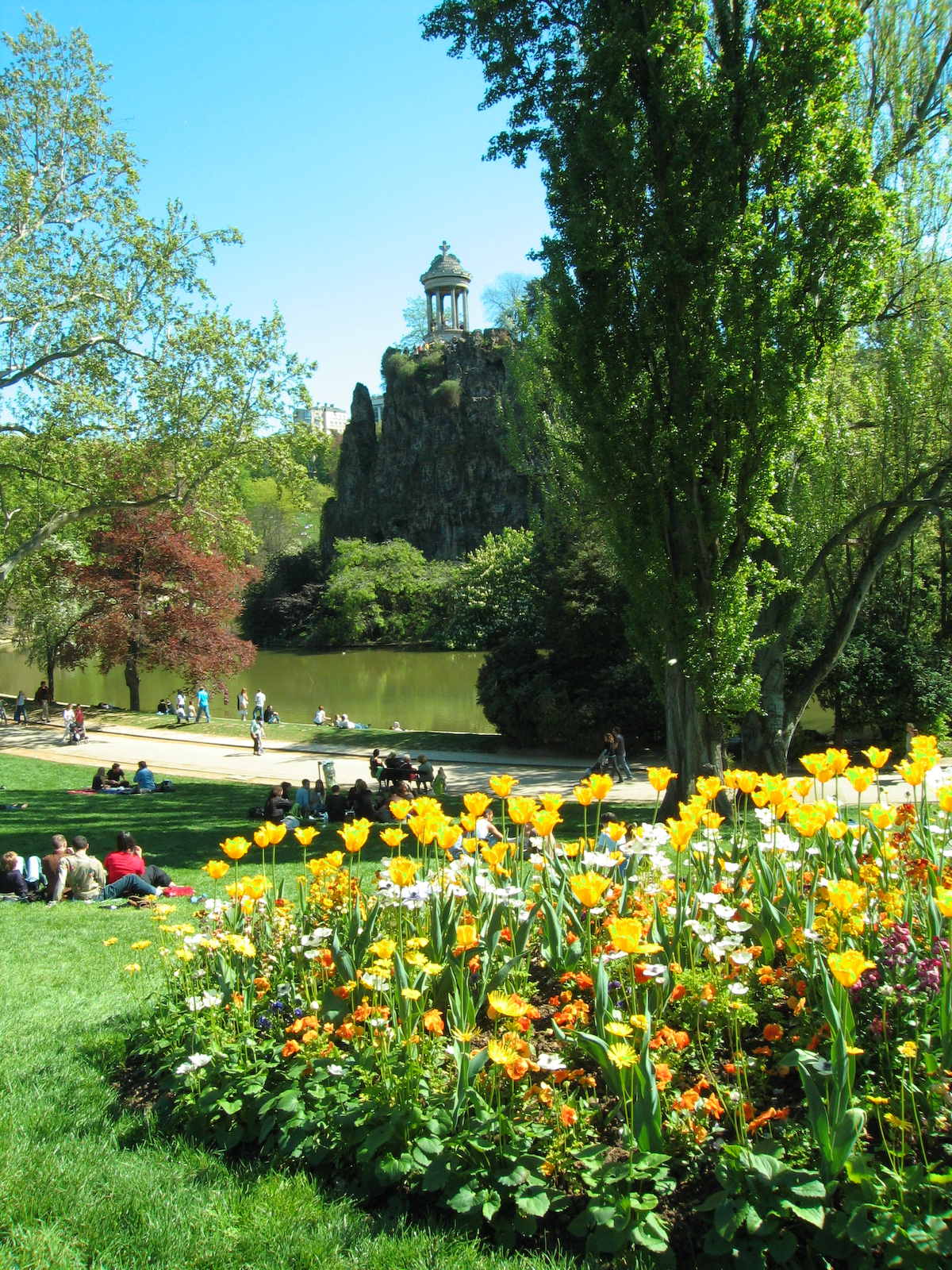
The Parc des Buttes Chaumont is a picturesque landscape garden opened by Napoleon III in 1867.

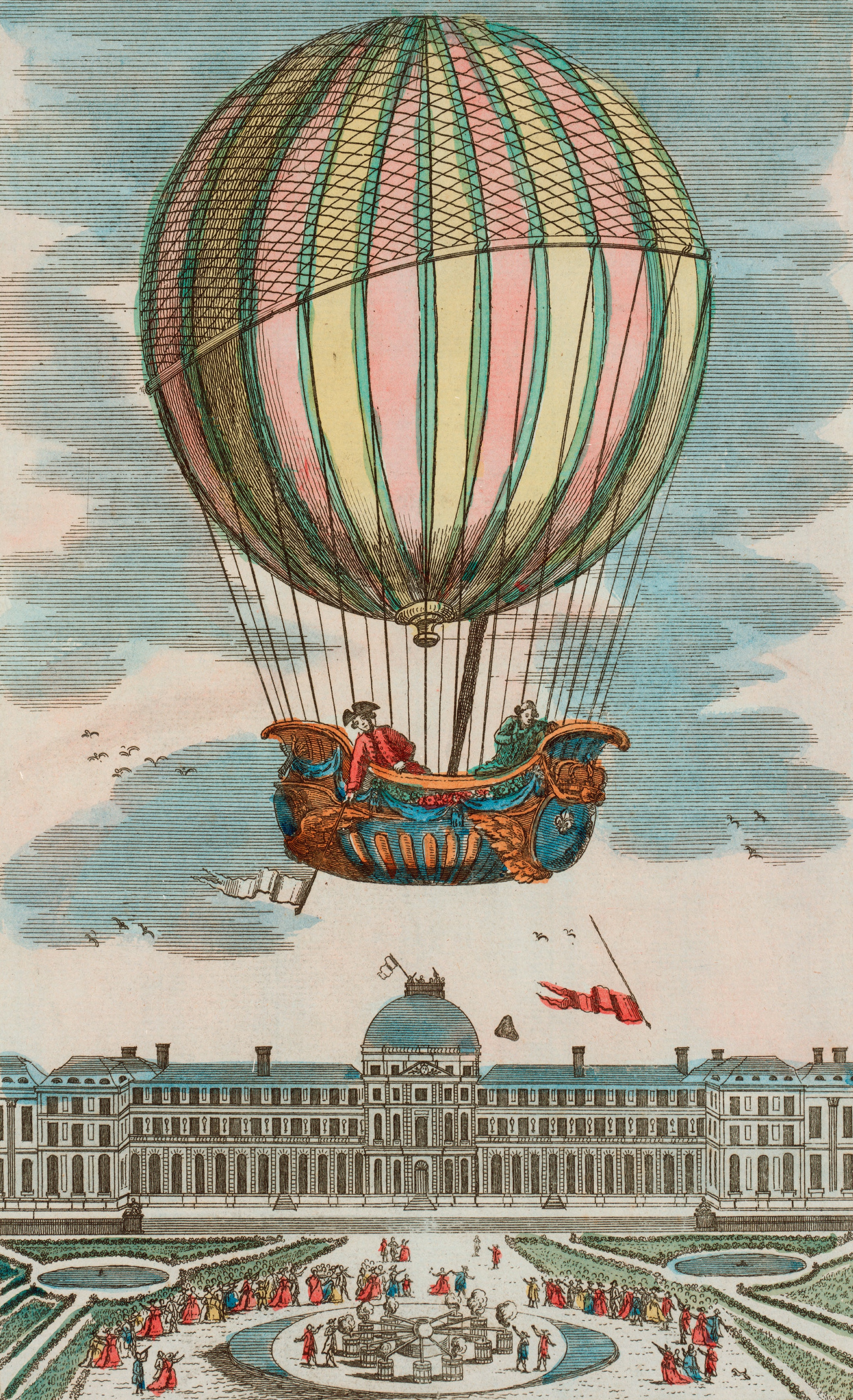
The first flight of a hydrogen balloon took place from the Tuileries garden on December 1, 1783.

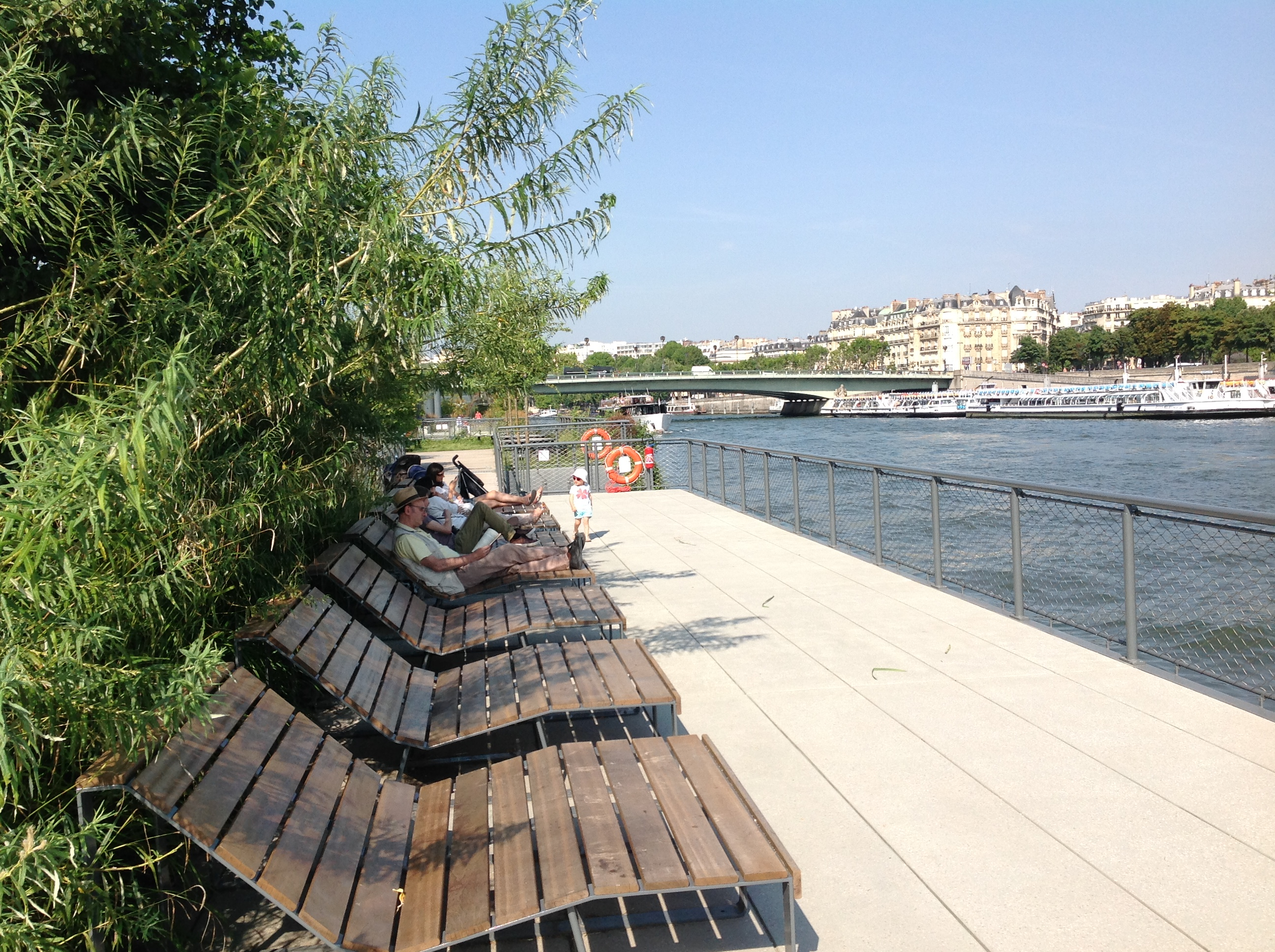
A "floating garden" of the Promenade des Berges de la Seine (2013), a 2.3 kilometer long park along the left bank of Seine in the 7th arrondissement

Paris today has more than 421 municipal parks and gardens, covering more than three thousand hectares and containing more than 250,000 trees. Two of Paris's oldest and most famous gardens are the Tuileries Garden, created in 1564 for the Tuileries Palace, and redone by André Le Nôtre in 1664; and the Luxembourg Garden, belonging to a château built for Marie de' Medici in 1612, which today houses the French Senate. The Jardin des Plantes was the first botanical garden in Paris, created in 1626 by Louis XIII's doctor Guy de La Brosse for the cultivation of medicinal plants. Between 1853 and 1870, the Emperor Napoleon III and the city's first director of parks and gardens, Jean-Charles Adolphe Alphand, created the Bois de Boulogne, the Bois de Vincennes, Parc Montsouris and the Parc des Buttes Chaumont, located at the four points of the compass around the city, as well as many smaller parks, squares and gardens in the neighborhoods of the city. One hundred sixty-six new parks have been created since 1977, most notably the Parc de la Villette (1987–1991) and Parc André Citroën (1992).

Some of the most notable recent gardens of Paris are not city parks, but parks belonging to museums, including the gardens of the Rodin Museum and the Musée du quai Branly or smaller intimate gardens of the Musée Delacroix or Musée de la Vie romantique.

== From Roman times through the Middle Ages ==
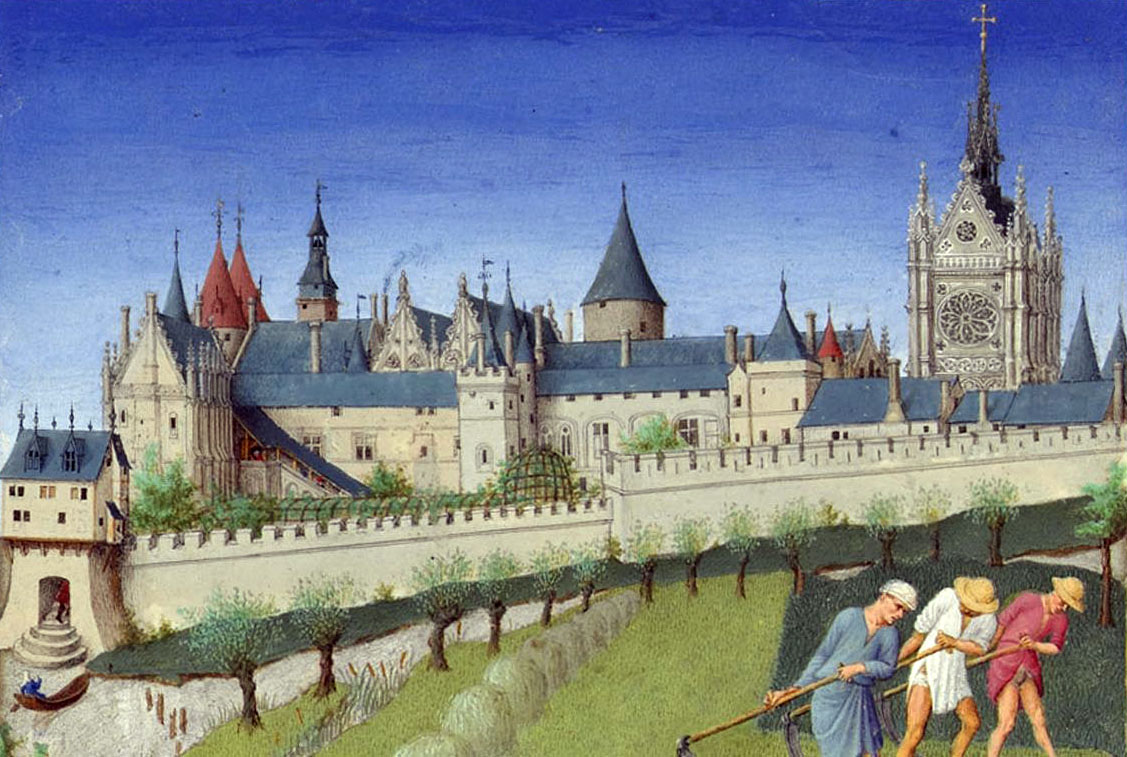
The enclosed garden of the Palais de la Cité is visible in this illustration from the Très Riches Heures du duc de Berry (1410). The old garden is now the Place Dauphine.

Gardens existed in Paris in Roman times and the Middle Ages, either to produce fruits, vegetables and medicinal herbs; for the meditation of monks; or for the pleasure of the nobility; but no trace remains of the original gardens of the Roman town of Lutetia.

The royal palace on the Île de la Cité had a walled garden located at the southern point of the palace, near where the statue of Henry IV on the Pont Neuf is today. The garden disappeared when the Place Dauphine was built in the early 17th century.

The monasteries on the left bank had extensive gardens and orchards from the Middle Ages until the French Revolution. The Jardin des Plantes was built on land that originally belonged to the Abbey of Saint Victor. and a large part of the Luxembourg Garden today belonged to the neighboring monastery of the Chartreux. A small modern recreation of a medieval garden is found today next to the Cluny Museum, the former residence of the abbot of the Abbey of Cluny.

== Renaissance Gardens and Gardens a la Française (1564–1700) ==
In 1495, King Charles VIII and his nobles imported the Renaissance garden style from Italy after their unsuccessful Italian War of 1494–1498. The new French Renaissance garden was characterized by symmetrical and geometric planting beds or parterres; plants in pots; paths of gravel and sand; terraces; stairways and ramps; moving water in the form of canals, cascades and monumental fountains, and extensive use of artificial grottoes, labyrinths and statues of mythological figures. They also featured a long axis perpendicular to the palace, with bodies of water and a view of the whole garden, They were designed to illustrate the Renaissance ideals of measure and proportion, and to remind viewers of the virtues of Ancient Rome. The French kings imported not only the ideas, but also Italian gardeners, landscape architects, and fountain-makers to create their gardens. The first examples in France were far from Paris, where there was more space for big gardens; the gardens of the royal Château d'Amboise (1496), the Château de Blois (c. 1500), Château de Fontainebleau (1528), and the Château de Chenonceau (1521), with additions by Catherine de' Medici in 1560.

In the mid-17th century, under Louis XIV, the French formal garden, or Jardin à la française, gradually replaced the Renaissance style garden; it was more formal and geometric, and symbolized the dominance of the King over nature. The most famous example was the gardens of Versailles, made by André Le Nôtre beginning in 1661. Le Nôtre remade the Tuileries Gardens in the new style beginning in 1664.

=== Jardins des Tuileries (1564) ===
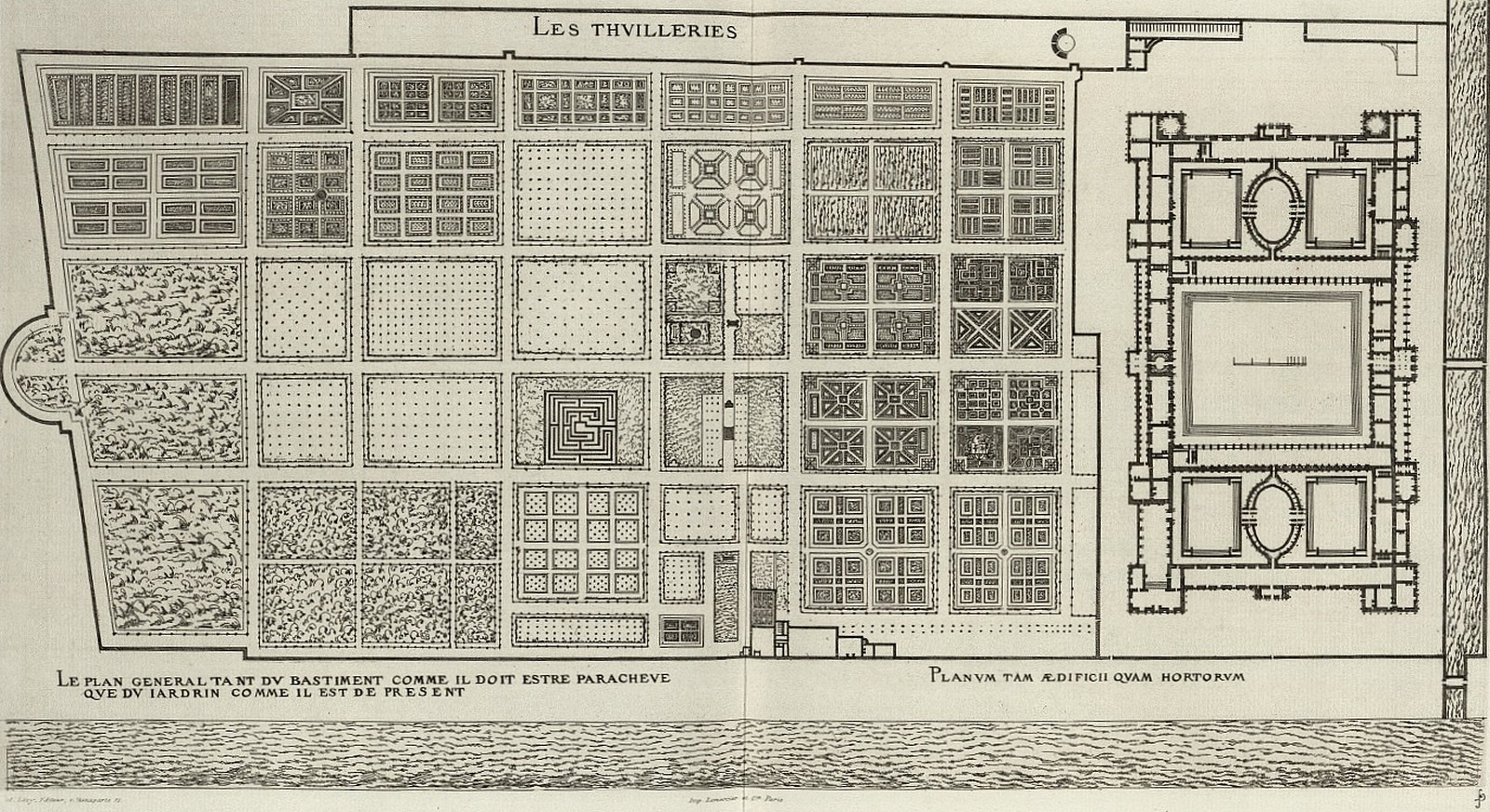
Plan of the Tuileries garden from 1576

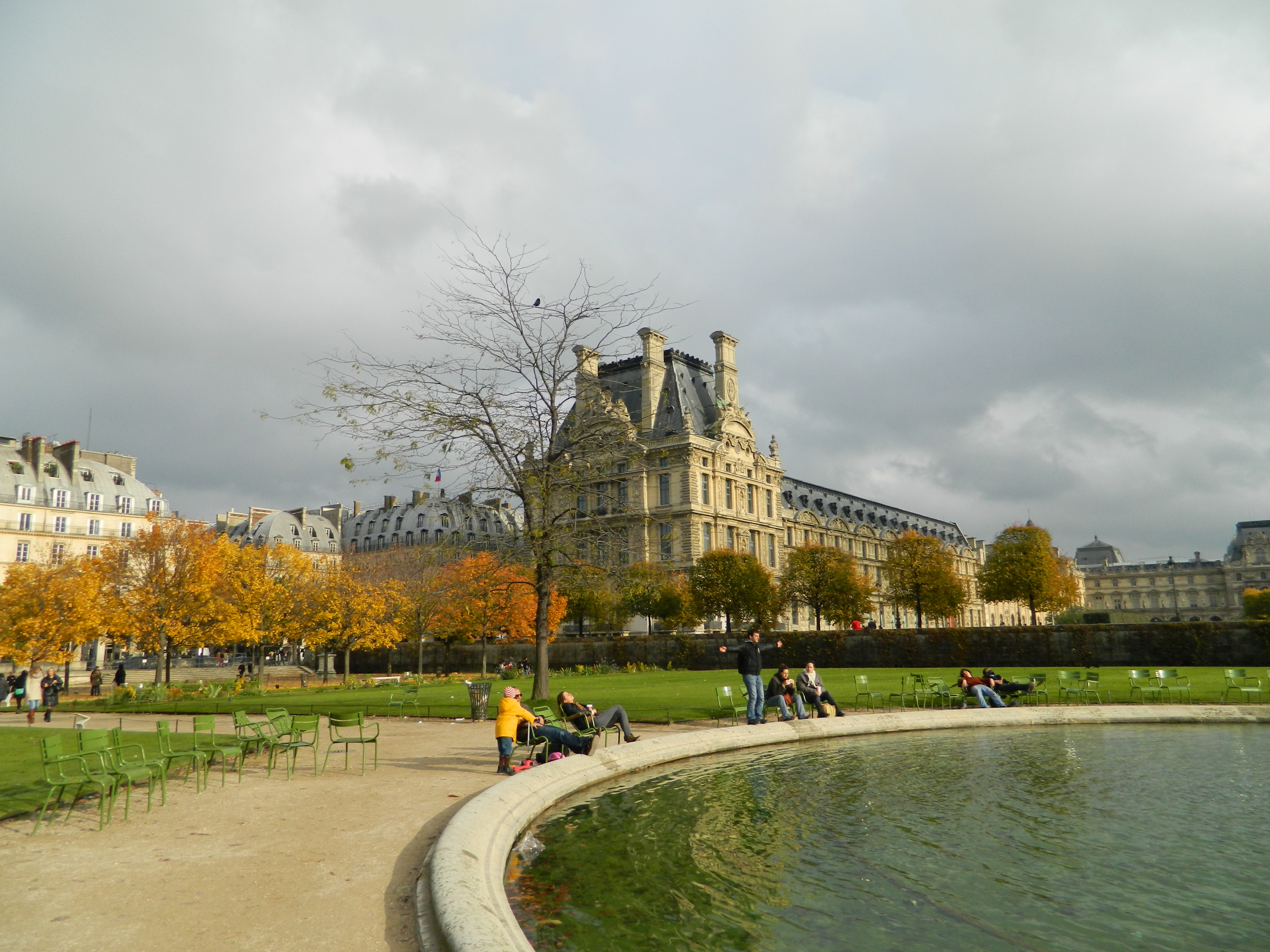
The Tuileries Gardens, created for Queen Catherine de' Medici in 1564 and remade by Andre le Notre for Louis XIV in 1664

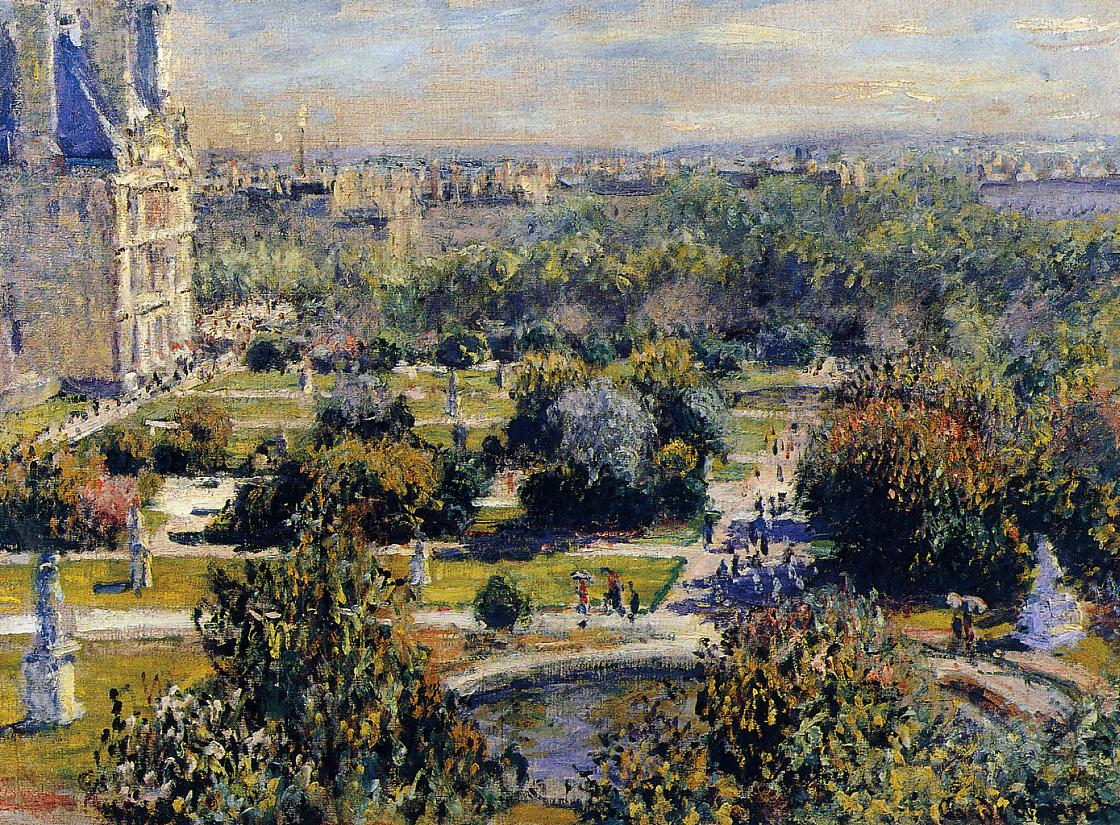
The Jardin des Tuileries painted by Claude Monet (1876)

The first royal garden of the Renaissance in Paris was the Jardin des Tuileries, created for Catherine de' Medici in 1564 to the west of her new Tuileries Palace. It was inspired by the gardens of her native Florence, particularly the Boboli Gardens, and made by a Florentine gardener, Bernard de Carnesecchi. The garden was laid out along the Seine, and divided into squares of fruit trees and vegetable gardens divided by perpendicular alleys and by boxwood hedges and rows of cypress trees. Like Boboli, it featured a grotto, with faience "monsters" designed by Bernard Palissy, whom Catherine had assigned to discover the secret of Chinese porcelain.

Under Henry IV, the old garden was rebuilt, following a design of Claude Mollet, with the participation of Pierre Le Nôtre, the father of the famous garden architect. A long terrace was built on the north side, looking down at the garden, and a circular basin was constructed, along with an octagonal basin on the central axis.

In 1664 he garden was remade again by André Le Nôtre in the style of the classic French formal garden, with parterres bordered with low shrubs and bodies of water organized along a wide central axis. He added the Grand Carré around the circular basin at the east end of the garden, and the horseshoe-shaped ramp at the west end, leading to a view of the entire garden.

In 1667, Charles Perrault, the author of Sleeping Beauty and other famous fairy tales, proposed to Louis XIV that the garden be opened at times to public. His proposal was accepted, and the public (with the exception of soldiers in uniform, servants and beggars) were allowed on certain days to promenade in the park.

=== Cours-la-Reine (Cours-Albert-I) (1616) ===
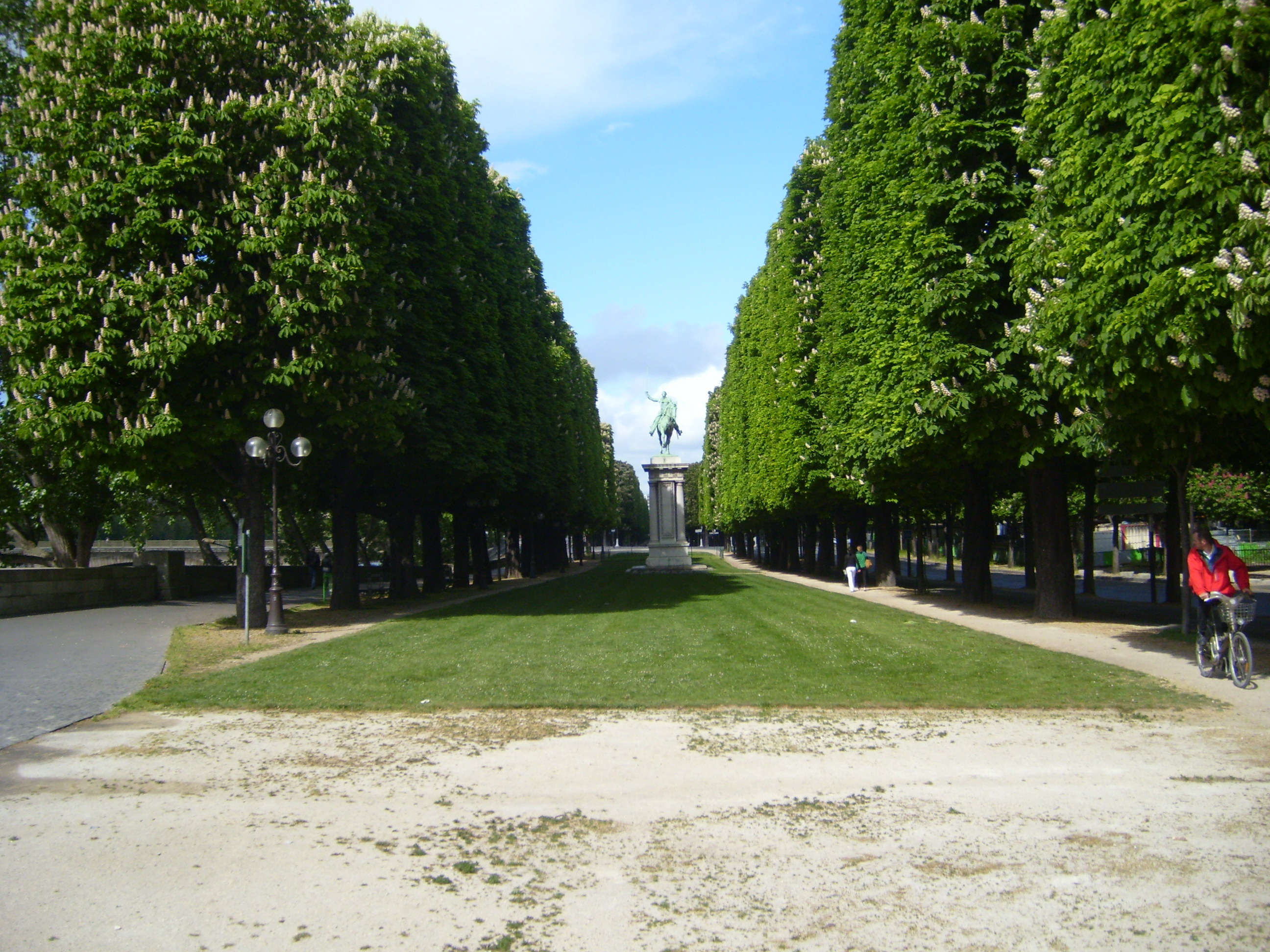
The Cours-la-Reine (1616)

The Cours-la-Reine (part of which today is named Cours-Albert-I after the King of Belgium during the First World War) was created by Marie de' Medici, who, like Catherine de' Medici, was nostalgic for her native Florence It was a long promenade (1.5 kilometers) along the Seine originally planted in with four long rows of elm trees. Built before the Champs Elysees, it was a popular promenade for the nobility, on foot or on horseback.

=== Place Royale (now Place des Vosges) (1605–1612) ===
Place Royale (renamed Place des Vosges in 1800) is a residential square and public park ordered by Henry IV and built between 1605 and 1612. In his ordinance, the King called for "a place to promenade for the residents of Paris who are closely pressed together in their houses." The square was 108 meters long on each side, and lined with houses of the same height and in the same style. The center of the square was empty until 1639, when it was filled with an equestrian statue of Louis XIII. The square was divided in flower beds and lawns by diagonal alleys. The statue was destroyed during the French Revolution, then replaced with a new statue in 1822 during the Restoration. Four fountains were added in 1840.

=== Place Dauphine (1607) and Square du Vert-Galant (1884) ===
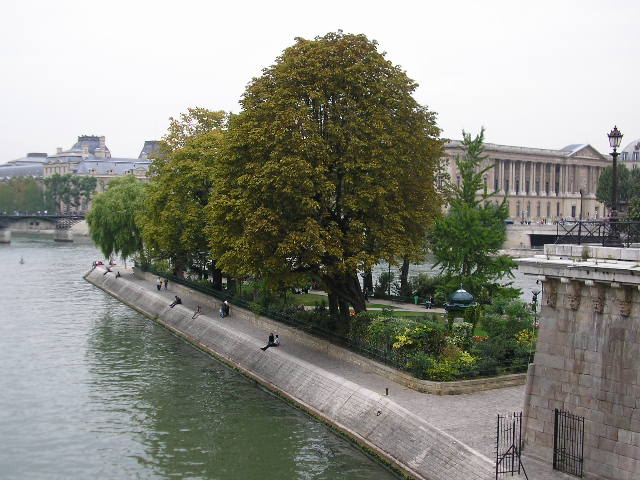
The Square du Vert-Galant at the Île de la Cité, takes its name from Henry IV, famous for his romantic affairs.

Place Dauphine was the second planned residential square, after the Place-Royale, built by order of Henry IV. It was located on the southern point of the Île de la Cité, on the site of the garden of the old royal palace. It was named for the future King Louis XIII, and was built in the shape of triangle, with the point touching the Pont Neuf, which had been finished in 1606. A statue of Henry IV on horseback was placed on the bridge at the entrance to the square in 1614, at the suggestion of his widow, Marie de' Medici. The original statue was destroyed during the French Revolution, but was replaced by a new statue in 1821.

The construction of the bridge joined two small islands to the Île de la Cité; one of these islands, the Île aux Juifs, had been the site where the last Grand Master of the Knights Templar, Jacques DeMolay had been burned at the stake in 1314. The point of the island below the bridge and the statue of Henry IV was turned into a public park in 1884, the Square du Vert Galant. It took its name from the nickname of Henry IV of France, famous for his romantic affairs.

=== Jardin des Plantes (1626) ===
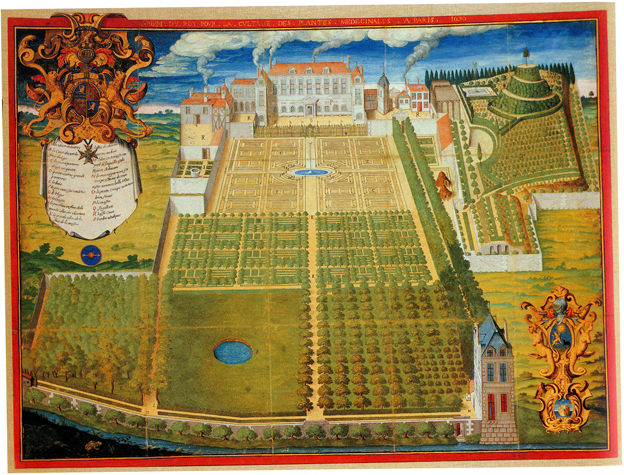
The Jardin des Plantes in 1636, when it was the Jardin royal des herbs medicinales

The Jardin des Plantes, originally called the Jardin royal des herbes médicinales, was opened in 1626, under the supervision of Guy de La Brosse, the physician of King Louis XIII. Its original purpose was to provide medicinal plants for the court. It was built on land purchased from the neighboring Abbey of Saint Victor. A labyrinth and belvedere from 1840 can still be seen in the northwest section of the garden. In 1640, it became the first Paris garden to open to the public.

In the eighteenth century, under the French natural scientist Georges-Louis Leclerc, Comte de Buffon, who directed it from 1739 to 1788, the garden was doubled in size by an exchange of land with the Abbey, extending down to the banks of the Seine, and was greatly expanded with the addition of trees and plants brought by French explorers from around the world. It contains a Robinia tree planted in 1636, and a sophora from 1747.

In 1793, after the Revolution, the royal garden became the National Museum of Natural History, and a zoo was added. with animals brought from the Palace of Versailles. The garden was expanded again, and a school of botany founded. The first greenhouse was built in 1833 by Charles Rohault de Fleury, a pioneer in the use of iron in architecture. The first of the large greenhouses seen today was built by Jules André in 1879; the greenhouse of cactuses by Victor Blavette in 1910; and the tropical greenhouse, 55 meters long, by René Berger in 1937. The alpine garden was added in 1931, and the rose garden and the Jardin des vivaces were added in 1964.

=== Jardin du Luxembourg (1630) ===
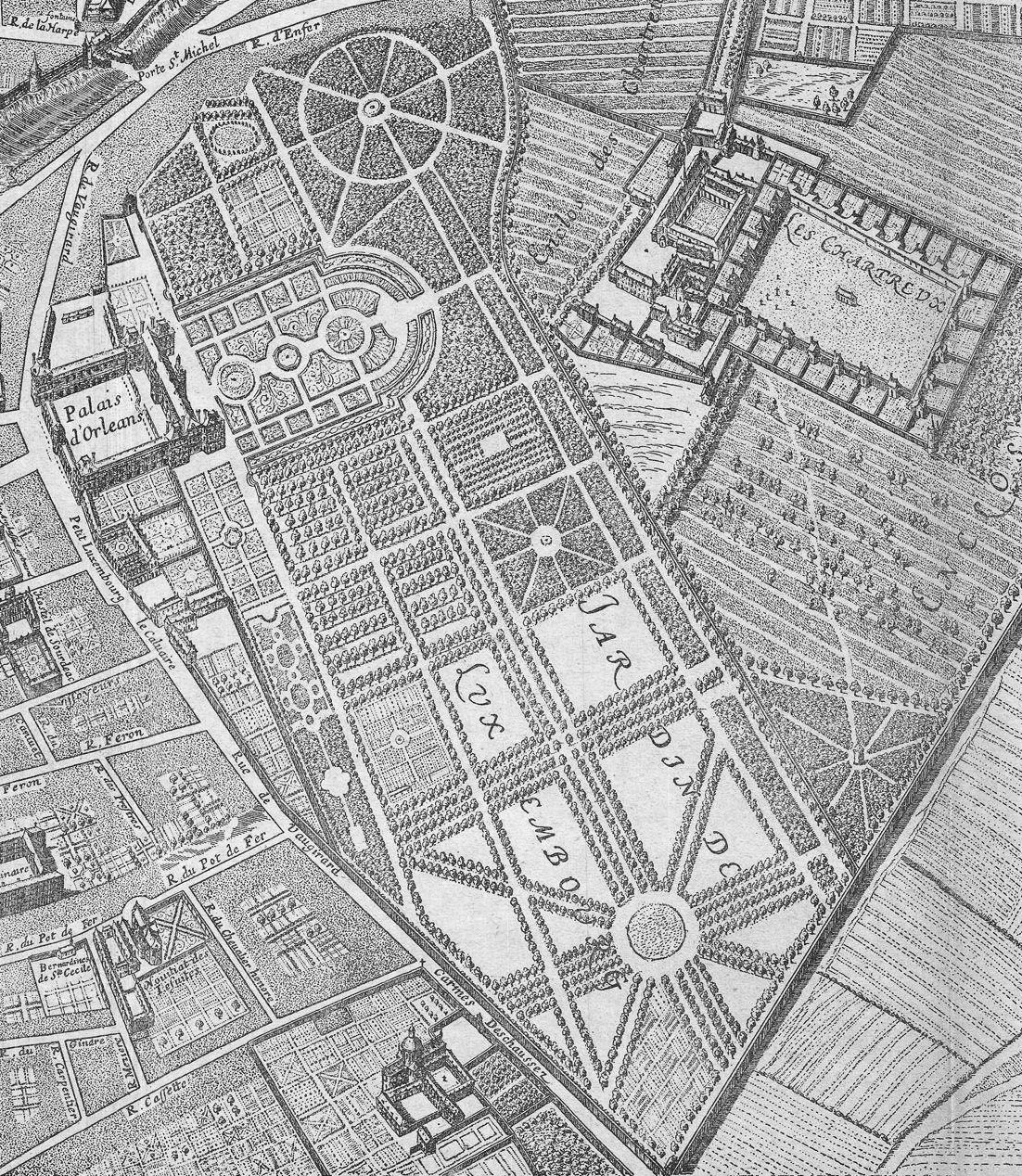
The Luxembourg Garden in 1652

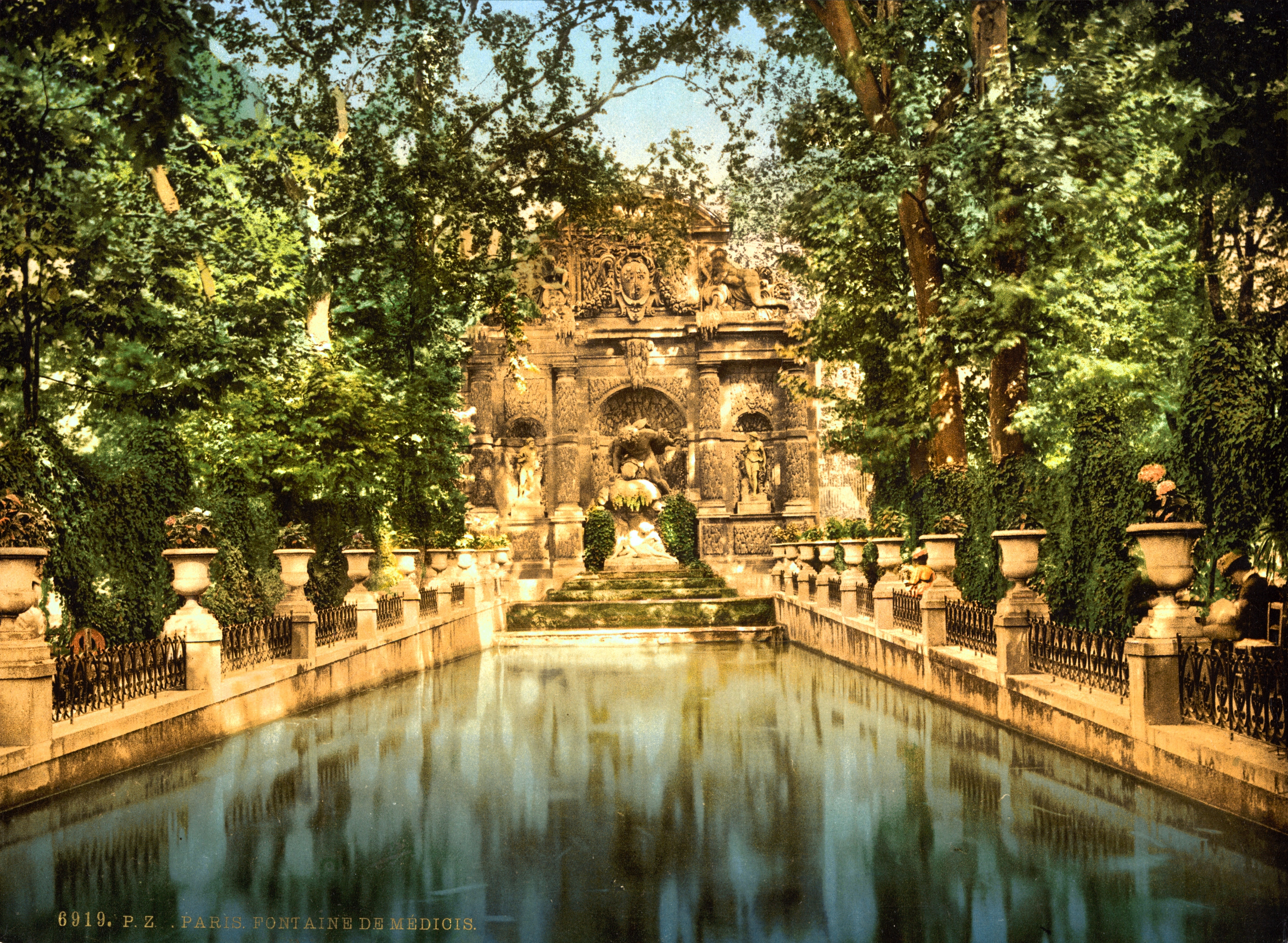
The Medici Fountain in the Luxembourg Garden

The Jardin du Luxembourg was created by Marie de' Medici, the widow of Henry IV between 1612 and 1630. It was placed behind the Luxembourg Palace, an imitation of the Pitti Palace in her native Florence. She began by planting two thousand elm trees, and commissioned a Florentine gardener, Tommaso Francini, to build the terraces and parterres, and the circular basin the center. The Medici Fountain was probably also the work of Francini, though it is sometimes attributed to Salomon de Brosse, the architect of the palace. After Marie de' Medici's death, the garden was largely neglected. The last royal owner was the Count de Provence, the future King Louis XVIII, who sold the eastern part of the garden for building lots.

After the French Revolution, the government of the French Directory nationalized the large pépiniére, or nursery, of the neighboring monastery of Chartreux, and attached it to the garden. In 1862, during the Second Empire, Georges-Eugène Haussmann replanted and restored the gardens, but also took a portion of the nursery in order to make room for two new streets, Rue Auguste Comte and Place André Honnorat. The Medici fountain was moved back to make room for the Rue de Medicis, and the present long basin and the statuary were added to the fountain.

During the reign of Louis-Philippe, who was fond of heroes of French history, the garden was decorated with the statues of the Queens of France and French women saints. During the French Third Republic, the government added the statues of writers, painters, composers, mythical figures, and a miniature of the Statue of Liberty by Frédéric Auguste Bartholdi. bringing the number of statues to more than seventy.

=== Jardin du Palais-Royal (1629) ===
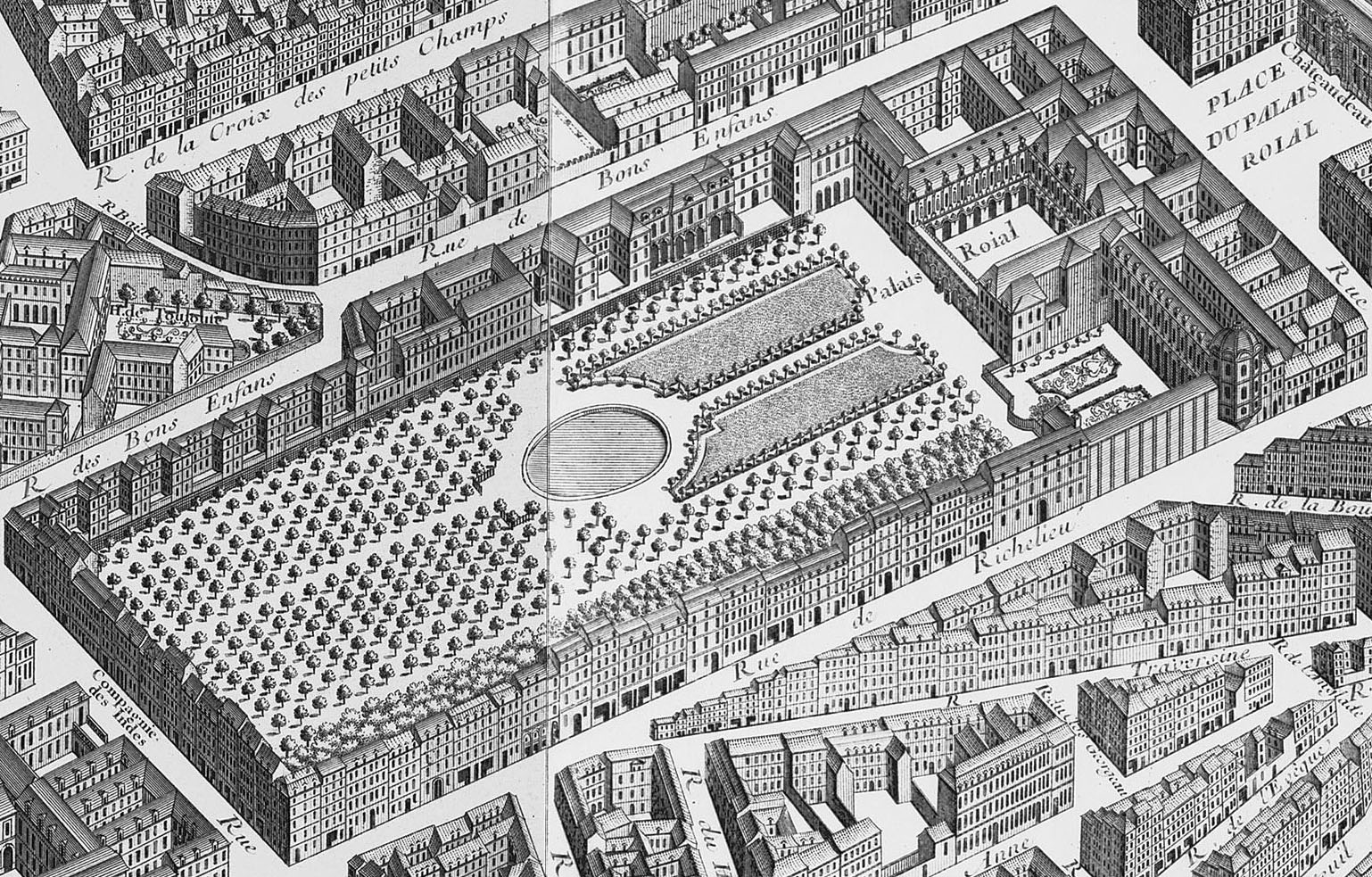
Gardens of the Palais Royal in 1739

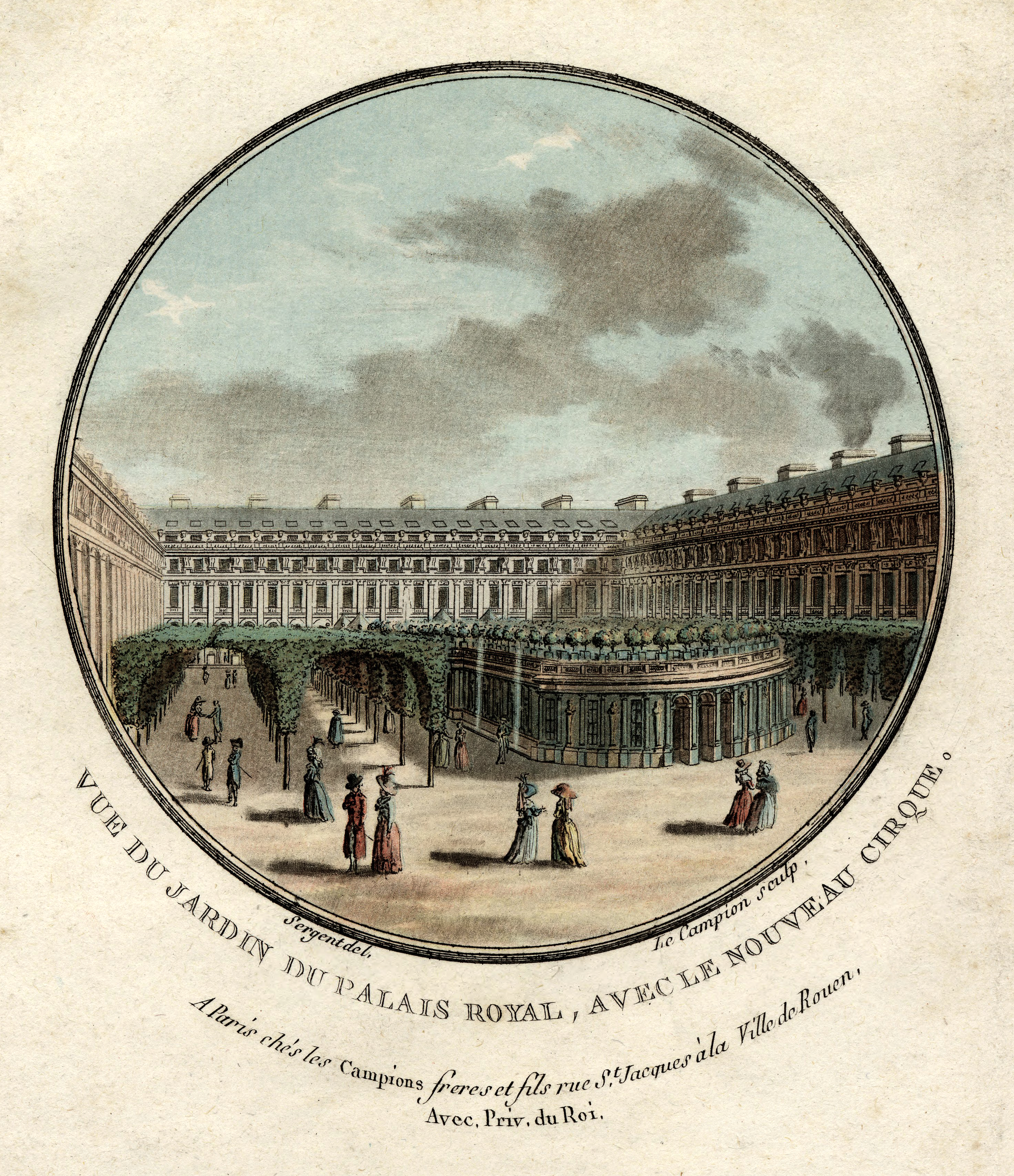
View of the Palais-Royal gardens in 1807, showing the circus, or riding hall

The garden of the Palais-Royal was built by Cardinal Richelieu, after he bought the hôtel d'Angennes in 1623 and turned it into his own residence, the Palais-Cardinal. When he died he left it to Louis XIV, who had played in the gardens as a child, and in 1643 it became the Palais-Royal. The garden, designed by Claude Desgots, featured two rows of elm trees, elaborate parterres and ornamental flower beds, statues, fountains and two basins, and a grove of trees at one end. It became the property of Monsieur, the brother of Louis XIV, in 1692, and thereafter belonged to members of Orleans branch of the dynasty. After the death of Louis XIV, it became the residence of the Regent, Philippe II, Duke of Orléans, whose dissolute lifestyle provoked many scandals. The gardens became a popular meeting place for writers, and also a place frequented by prostitutes.

A fire destroyed much of the Palais in 1773, and the owner, Louis Philippe II, Duke of Orléans, decided to turn it into a profit-making establishment. He built an arcade of shops and cafés encircling the garden, with residences above, with a wooden gallery for promenading around the garden. A circus was established in the center for horseback riding. Since it was private property, he police were not permitted access. In the years before and after the Revolution, the garden and surrounding buildings became the meeting place for revolutionaries, for political debate, gambling and higher-class prostitution. The Theatre-Francaise, the future Comédie-Française, was established there in 1787. During the Revolution, the garden and arcade was nationalized, and the heads of those guillotined were on several occasions carried on pikes by a crowd around the garden, in front of the diners in the cafes. The owner of the garden, though he supported the Revolution and changed his name to Philippe-Egalité, was guillotined in 1793.

After the Restoration, the new Duke of Orleans, Louis-Philippe recovered his property, and returned it to respectability. He expelled the gambling salons and prostitutes, and had the garden and arcade rebuilt into roughly the way they look today. The Palais-Royale was burned by the Communards in May 1871, along with the Tuileries Palace and other symbols of royalty, and were rebuilt. During the 20th century, the residences overlooking the garden were the home of many French celebrities, including André Malraux, Jean Cocteau and Colette. and Two works of modern sculpture were added in 1986; an arrangement of columns, by Daniel Buren, and a fountain-sculpture of steel balls, by Pol Bury.

== English gardens and follies (1700–1800) ==
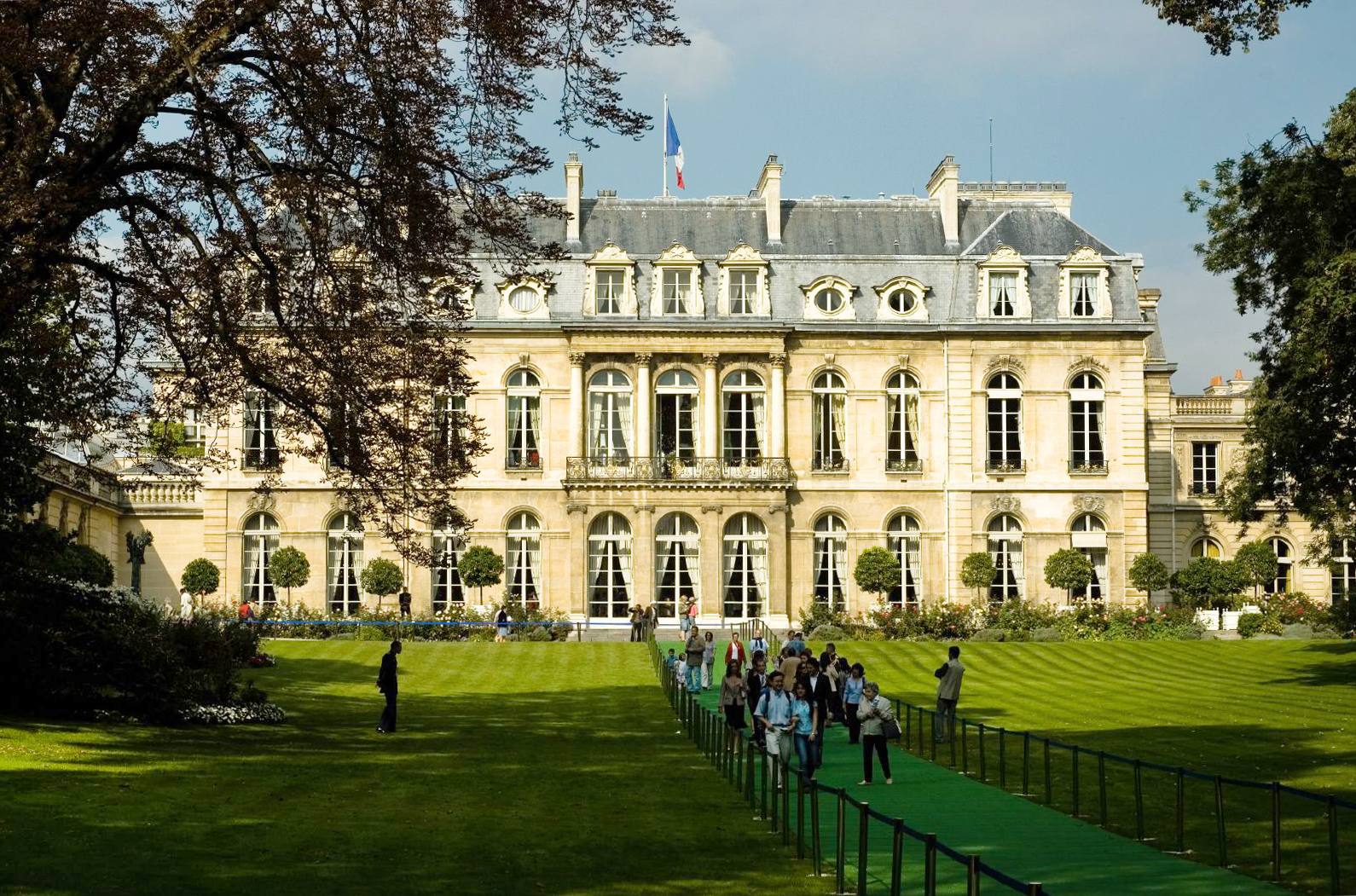
Gardens of the Élysée Palace, the residence of the President of France (1722) were the largest private gardens in Paris before the Revolution.

Beginning in the mid-18th century, the French landscape garden began to replace the more formal and geometric jardin à la française. The new style originated in England in the early 18th century as the English landscape garden or Anglo-Chinese garden. It was inspired by the idealized romantic landscapes and the paintings of Hubert Robert, Claude Lorrain and Nicolas Poussin, European ideas about Chinese gardens, and the philosophy of Jean-Jacques Rousseau. The earliest example of the style in France was the Moulin Joli (1754–1772), along the Seine between Colombes and Argenteuil. the most famous was the Hameau de la Reine of Marie Antoinette in the gardens of Versailles (1774–1779).

In the late 18th century the Paris town houses of the French aristocracy, both on the right bank and left bank, usually had gardens in the English style. The largest private gardens in Paris were (and still are) those of the Élysée Palace (1722), now the residence of the President of France. and of the Hôtel Matignon (1725), the official residence of the Prime Minister of France (neither is open to the public).

The folly was a specific kind of Paris park that appeared in the end of the eighteenth century. Privately owned but open to the public, they were designed for both amusement and instruction, filled with architectural models from different parts of the world and different centuries. Most of the early Paris follies had a short life and were divided into building lots: the most famous follies were the Follies of Bouexière (1760), Boutin (1766), Beaujon (1773) and Folie Saint James (1777–1780). The one survivor, much transformed, is the Parc Monceau.

=== Parc Monceau (1778) ===
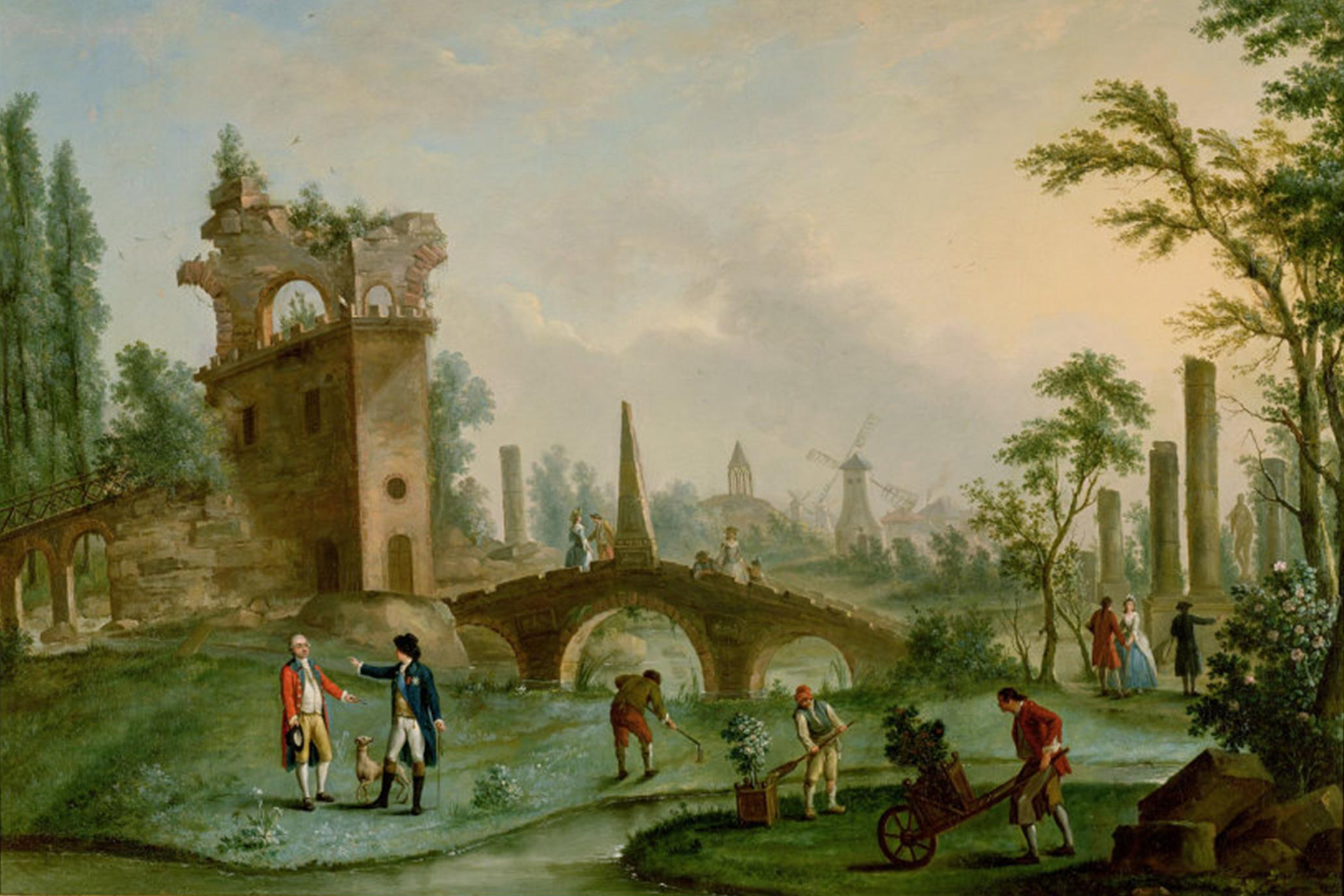
An illustration by Louis Carrogis Carmontelle of the follies he created for Parc Monceau

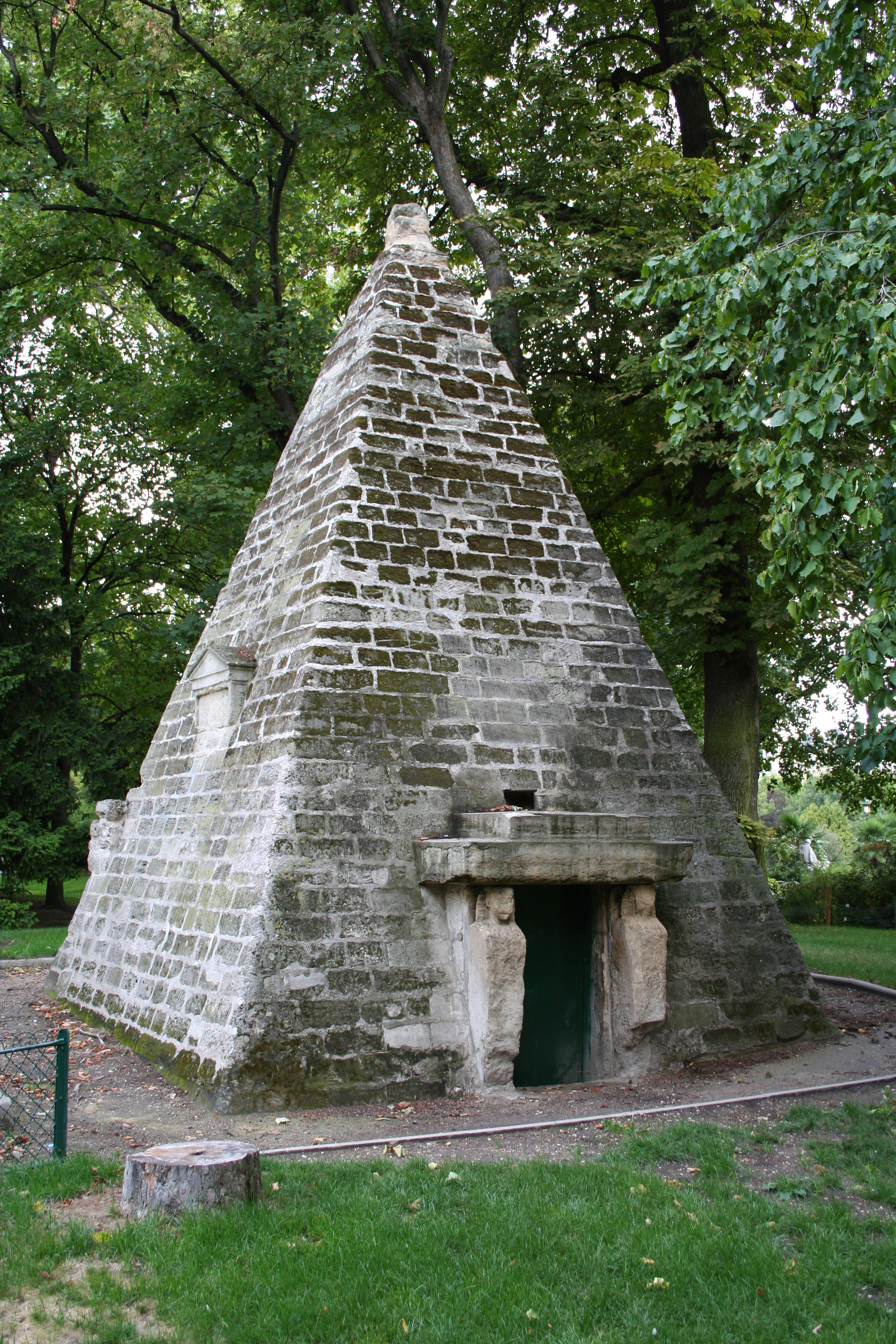
The Egyptian pyramid in Parc Monceau, the garden of "all times and places" (1778)

Parc Monceau was established by Phillippe d'Orléans, Duke of Chartres, a cousin of King Louis XVI, wealthy, and active in court politics and society. In 1769 he had begun purchasing the land where the park is located. In 1778, he decided to create a public park, and employed the writer and painter Louis Carrogis Carmontelle to design the gardens. In 1778, when the garden opened, Carmontelle was accused of imitating the English garden. In his book of images of the garden published in 1779, he responded: "It is not at all an English garden that we made at Monceau... we reunited in one single garden all times and all places. It is a simple fantasy, the desire to have an extraordinary garden, a pure amusement, and not a desire to imitate a nation, which, in making "natural" gardens, runs a roller over all the lawns and ruins nature." The park contained dozens of fabriques, or constructions, including an Egyptian pyramid, antique sculptures, a Gothic ruin, a Tatar tent, a Dutch windmill, a minaret, a Roman temple, and an enchanted grotto,. Visitors to the garden were instructed to follow a certain path, from site to site. The experience was enhanced by park employees in exotic costumes, and camels and other rare animals.

Beginning in 1781, most of the fabriques were removed, and Parc Monceau was remade into a more traditional English landscape garden. During the reign of Napoleon III, the park became the property of the city of Paris, and was made into a public park. Sections of the park were sold for the construction of large new townhouses to help finance the construction of the park. The park was surrounded by a monumental ornamental iron gate and fence and planted with a wide variety of exotic trees, shrubs and flowers. During the French Third Republic, the park was filled with statues of composers and writers. An arcade of the old Hôtel de Ville, burned by the Paris Commune in 1871, was installed in the garden to provide a picturesque ruin. A few traces of the original folly, including the Egyptian pyramid, can still be seen.

=== Parc de Bagatelle (1778–1787) ===
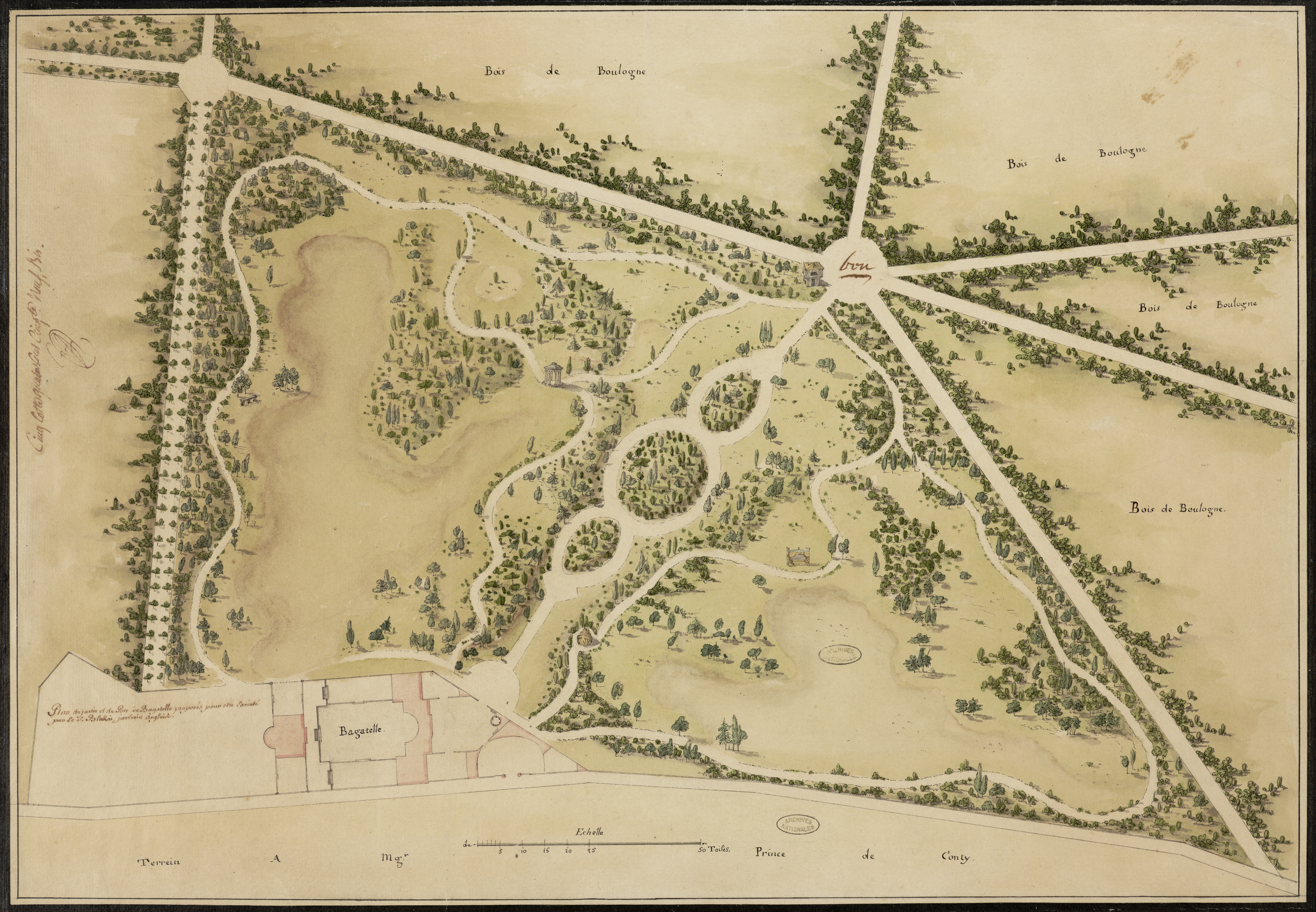
Map of the garden by Thomas Blaikie

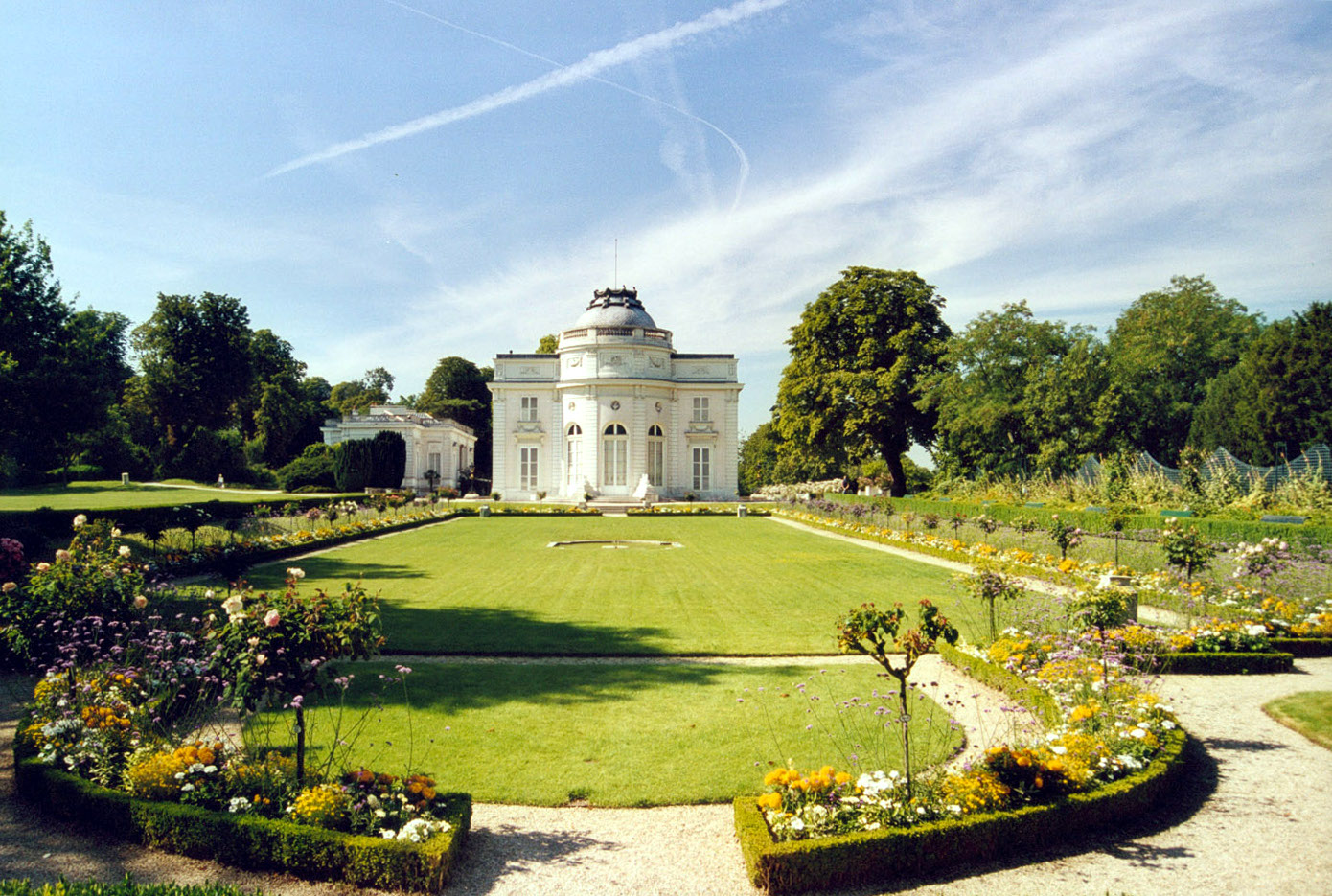
Gardens and chateau of the Parc de Bagatelle (1778–1787)

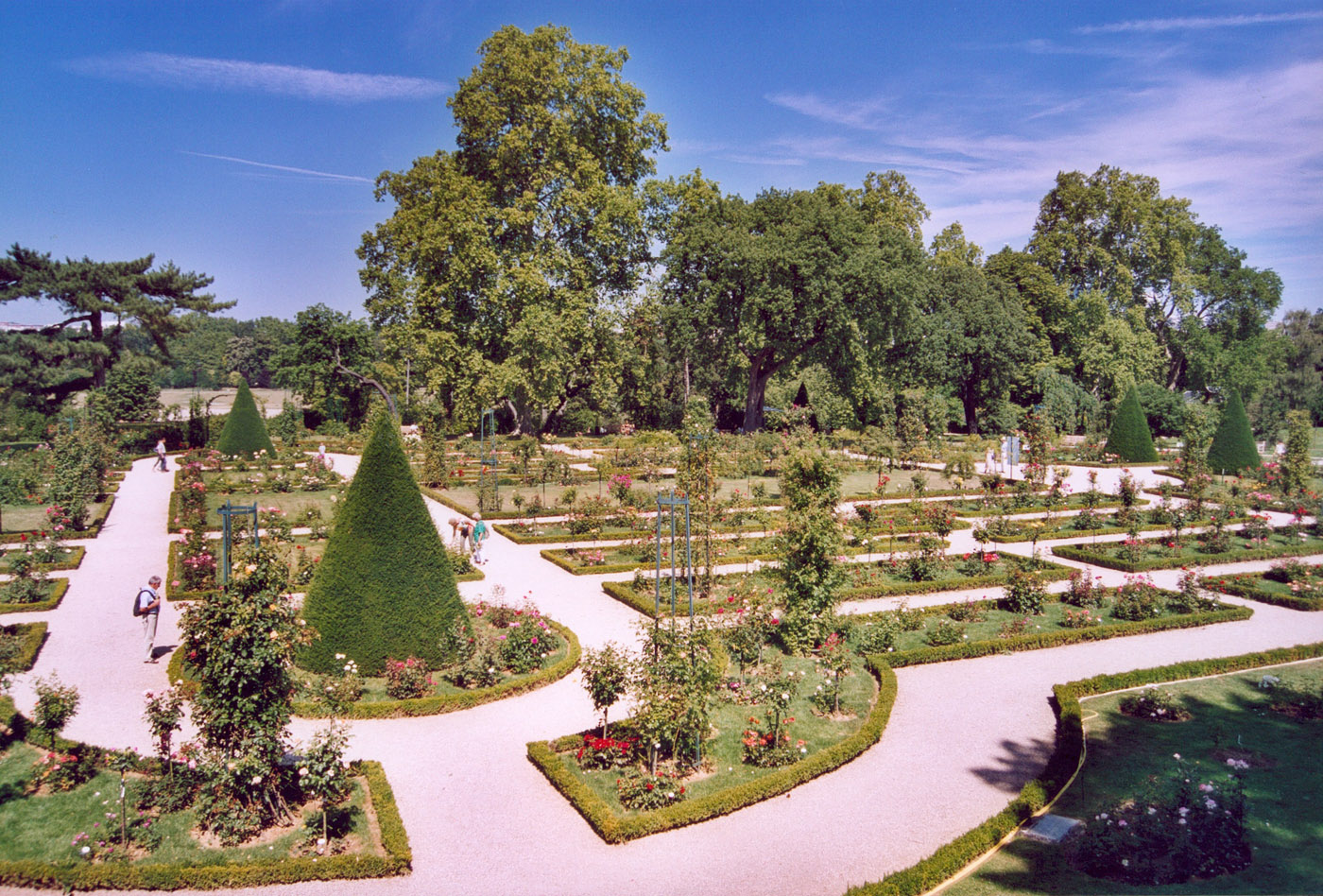
The rose garden of Bagatelle

The Parc de Bagatelle was created by the Count of Artois, the future King Charles X of France, on a section of the Bois de Boulogne that he had purchased in 1777. He made a wager with his sister-in-law, Marie Antoinette, that he could build a château where she could be entertained in less than three months. Construction of the little château began on 21 September and was finished on 26 November. The chateau was the work of the architect François-Joseph Bélanger, while the garden was made by the Scottish landscape designer Thomas Blaikie. The garden was built at the same time as the Parc Monceau, and, like that garden, it was filled with fabriques and follies, including a hill made of rocks crowned by a "Pavilion of Philosophers" that was half-Gothic and half-Chinese; an obelisk, a bridge surmounted by a pagoda, Gothic ruins, a tatar tent and a spiral labyrinth. All the follies gradually disappeared, and the park became a more traditional English garden. The pavilion on top of the pile of rocks was replaced by a more traditional structure. During the Second Empire, the Pavilion of Eugénie in the rose garden was added, in honor of the frequent visits to the garden of the Empress of Napoleon III.

After the French Revolution, the garden was nationalized and made into a restaurant and a place for balls and festivals. After the restoration of the monarchy, it was returned to Count of Artois, whose family sold it in 1835 to Richard Seymour-Conway, 4th Marquess of Hertford, an English aristocrat who had settled in Paris. He and his heir, Sir Richard Wallace purchased additional land and enlarged the garden from 16 hectares (40 acres) to 24 hectares (59 acres) and reconstructed it, adding new terraces, lawns, the picturesque pond with lily-pads, and many trees, including a giant sequoia, planted in 1845, that now is more than 45 meters high.

In 1905 the heirs of Richard Wallace ceded the park to the City of Paris, which made extensive additions, including an enlarged rose garden, which became the site of the Concours international de roses nouvelles de Bagatelle, the international competition of new roses, in 1907.

=== Garden of the Rodin Museum (1755) ===
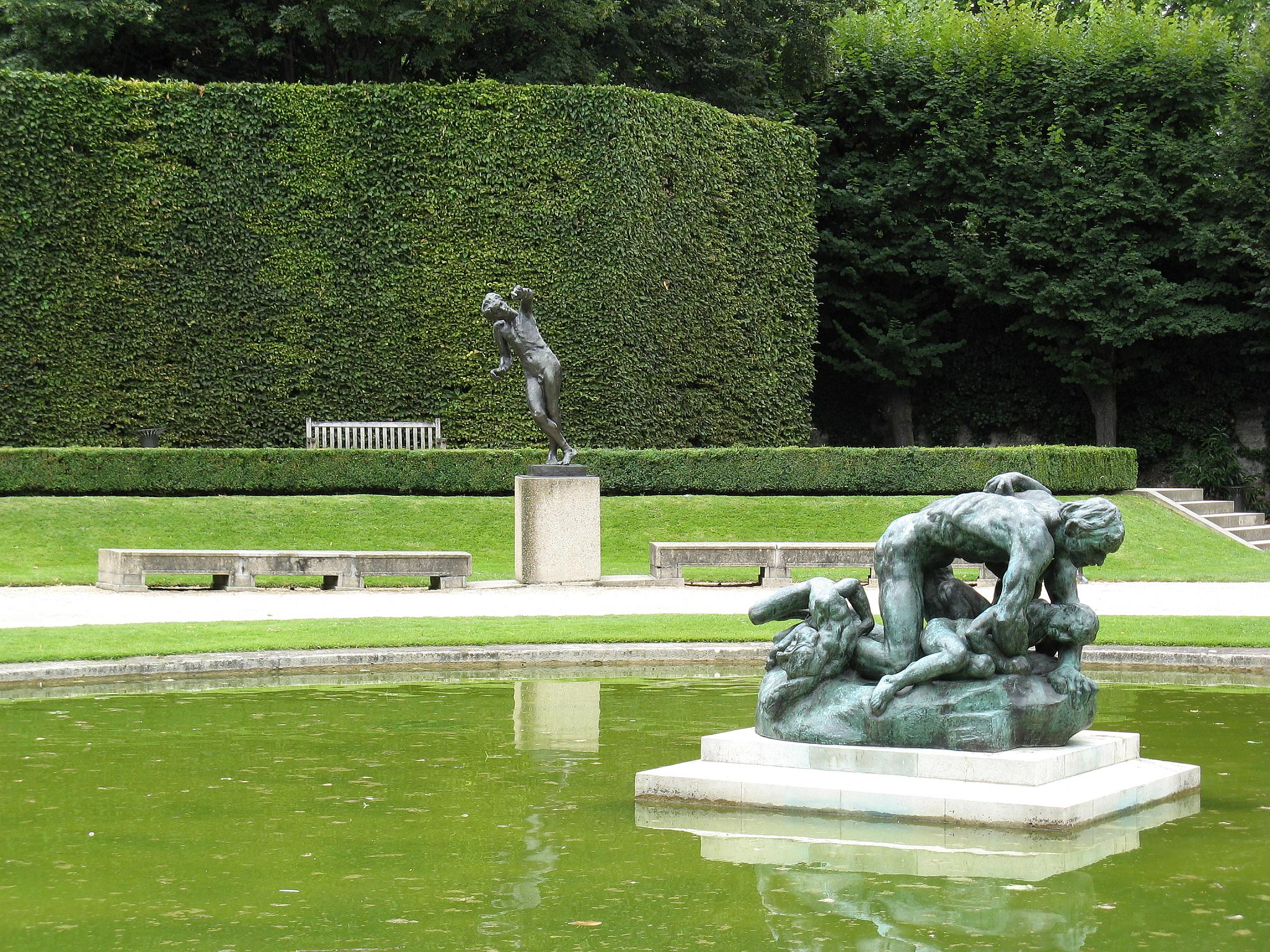
The gardens of the Musée Rodin, a modern reinterpretation of an 18th-century formal residential garden

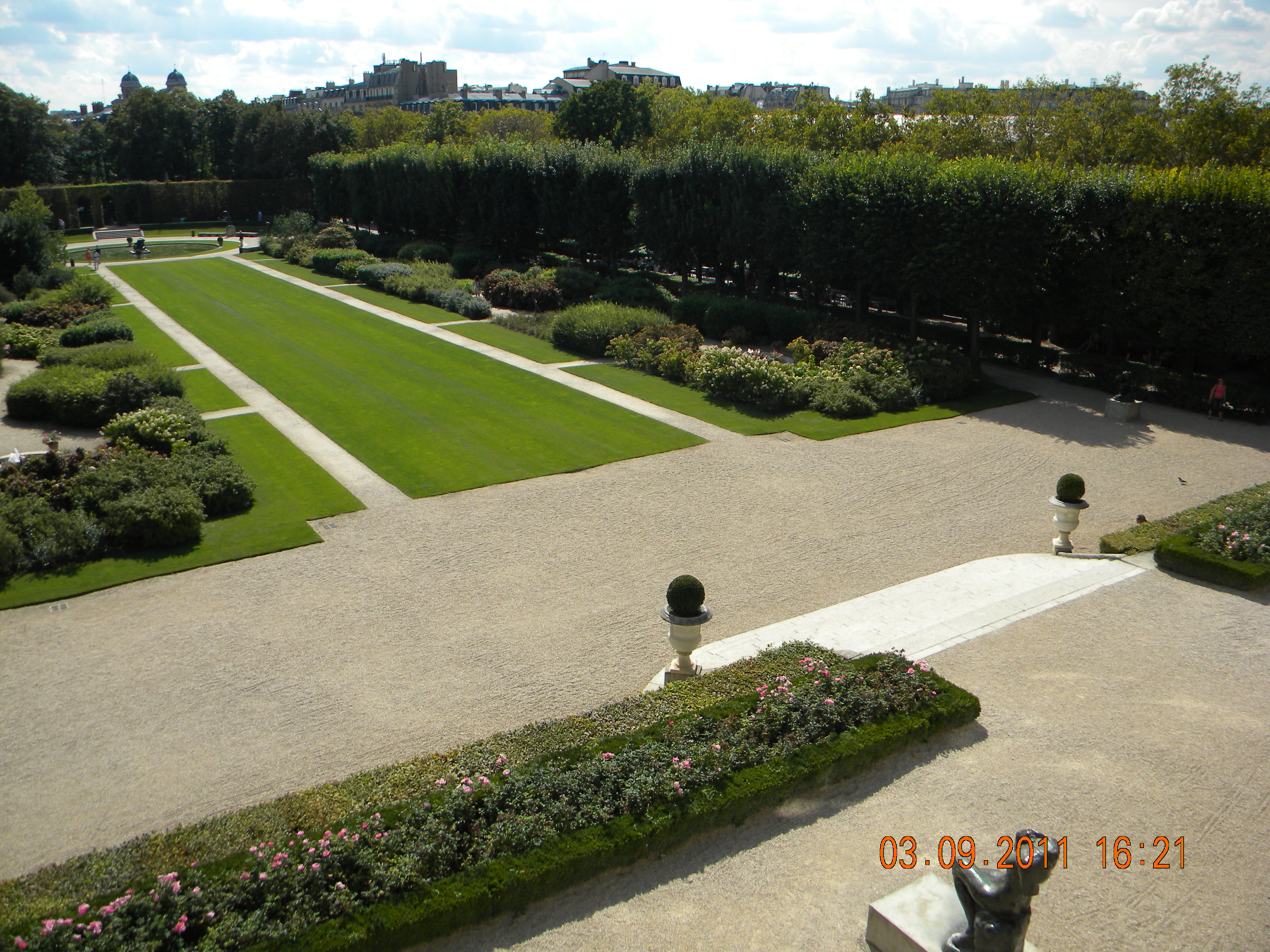
Gardens of the Musée Rodin (1755)

The Musée Rodin was originally constructed between 1728 and 1731 as a townhouse for Abraham Peyrenc, a wealthy Paris wig-maker. The second owner, the Duchess of Maine, created a long green for lawn-bowling, two covered alleys, and a grove of trees to the left of the entrance. The house and garden were purchased 1755 by Louis Antoine de Gontaut, the Duke of Biron and a Marechal of the royal army. He enlarged the garden to the south. Following the design of architect Pierre-François Aubert and gardener Dominique Moisy, the garden became a model of a classic French formal garden; The lawn was divided by a long north–south perspective and made into four sections of flowerbeds around an eighteen-meter basin. The east side of the garden was filled with trees, and they added an orangerie, a Dutch tulip garden, and a vegetable garden at the end. The Duke frequently held elaborate festivities and garden parties there, and often opened the garden to the public.

The Duke died in 1788, on the eve of the Revolution. After the Revolution the house and garden became the property of the Papal legate, then of the Russian Ambassador, and then, in 1820, of a religious order, the Dames du Sacré-Coeur-du-Jésus, and served as a boarding school until 1904. During that time the basin was filled in, garden largely let to grow wild, an orchard of fruit trees was added. The Dames also built a neo-gothic chapel in 1875, which, after the order was dissolved in 1904, became a residence where writers and artists could rent space. The sculptor Auguste Rodin became one of the tenants in 1908. The house and garden were purchased by the French State in 1911. Part of the garden was taken to build the neighboring Lycée Victor Duruy, but Rodin remained as tenant and placed works of his sculpture along the main path. After his death in 1917, it became a museum devoted to his work, which opened in 1919.

The basin was restored in 1927, but otherwise the garden remained much as it had been under the religious order. Beginning in 1993, the garden was redesigned by landscape designer Jacques Sgard both as an open-air gallery to display the works of Rodin, but also to recapture the appearance of an 18th-century formal French residential garden.

== Parks and gardens of Napoleon III (1852–1870) ==
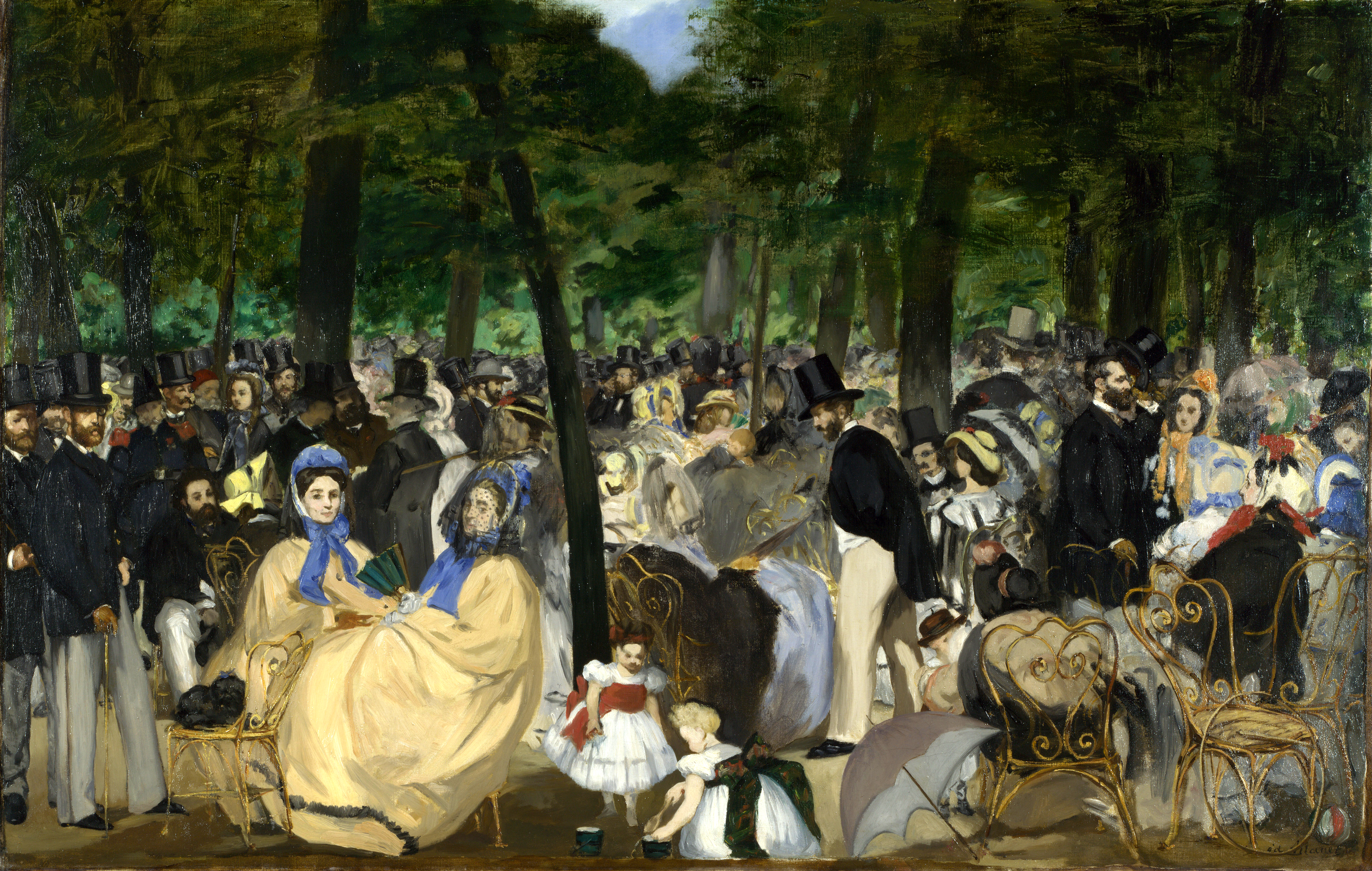
Music in the Tuileries, by Edouard Manet (1862)

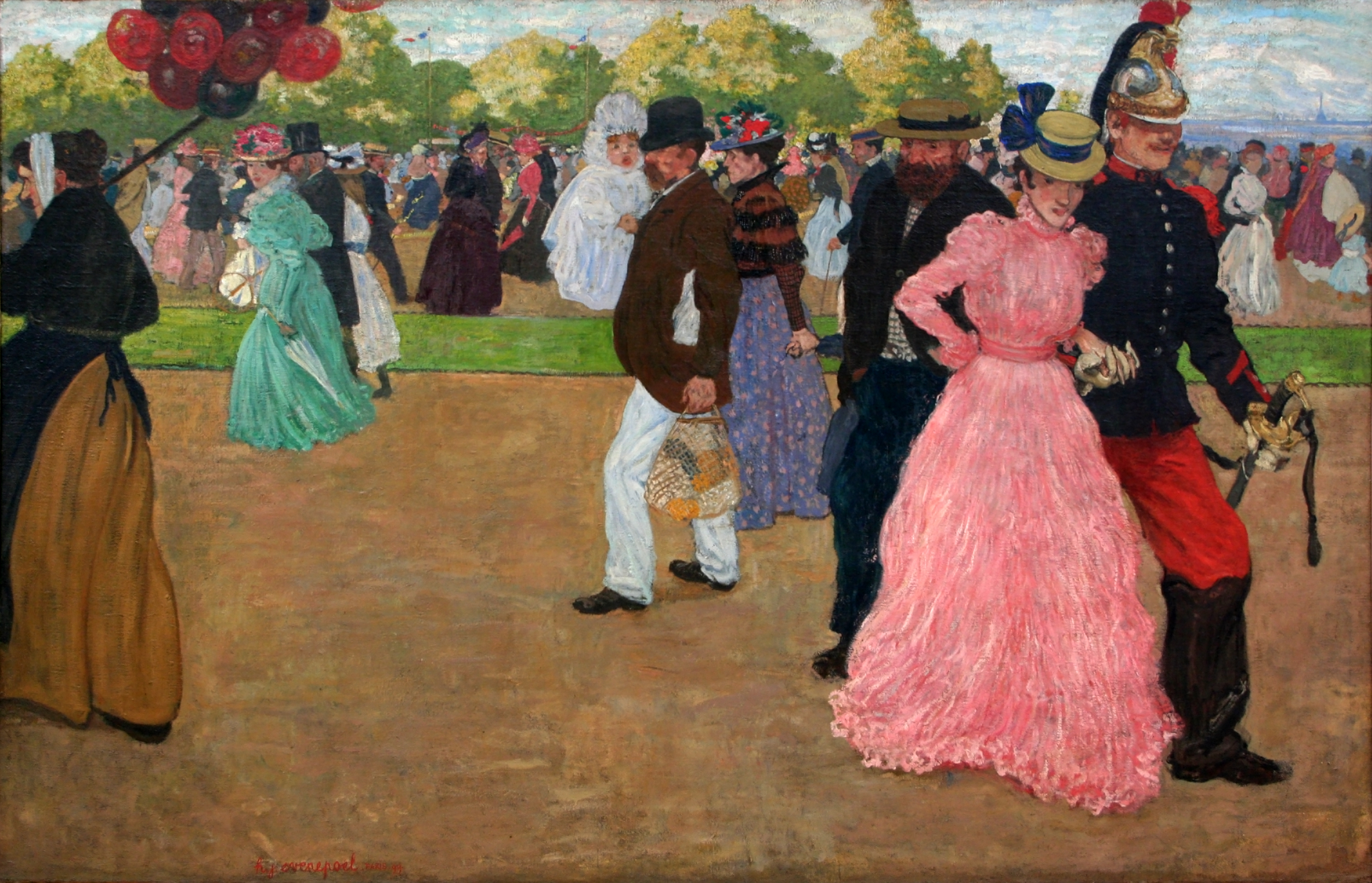
Sunday Stroll in the Bois de Boulogne, by Henri Evenepoel (1890s)

Napoleon III became the first elected President of France by an overwhelming vote in 1848. When he could not run for re-election, he organized a coup d'état in December 1851 and had himself declared Emperor of the French in December 1852. One of his first priorities as Emperor was to build new parks and gardens for Paris, particularly in the neighborhoods far from the center, where the few public parks of the city were all located.

Napoleon III named Georges-Eugène Haussmann his new prefect of the Seine in 1853, and commissioned him to build his new parks. Haussmann assembled a remarkable team: Jean-Charles Adolphe Alphand, the city's first Director of the new Service of Promenades and Plantations; Jean-Pierre Barillet-Deschamps, the city's first gardener-in-chief; Eugène Belgrand, a hydraulic engineer who rebuilt the city's sewers and water supply, and provided the water needed for the parks; and Gabriel Davioud, the city's chief architect, who designed chalets, temples, grottos, follies, fences, gates, lodges, lampposts and other park architecture.

Over the course of seventeen years, Napoleon III, Haussmann and Alphand created 1,835 hectares (7.08 sq mi) of new parks and gardens, and planted more than six hundred thousand trees, the greatest expansion of Paris green space before or since. They built four major parks in the north, south, east and west of the city, replanted and renovated the historic parks, and added dozens of small squares and gardens, so that no one lived more than ten minutes from a park or square. In addition, they planted tens of thousands of trees along the new boulevards that Haussmann created, reaching out from the center to the outer neighborhoods. The parks of Paris, particularly the Tuileries gardens and the new Bois de Boulogne, provided entertainment and relaxation for all classes of Parisians during the Second Empire.

=== The Bois de Boulogne (1852–1858) ===
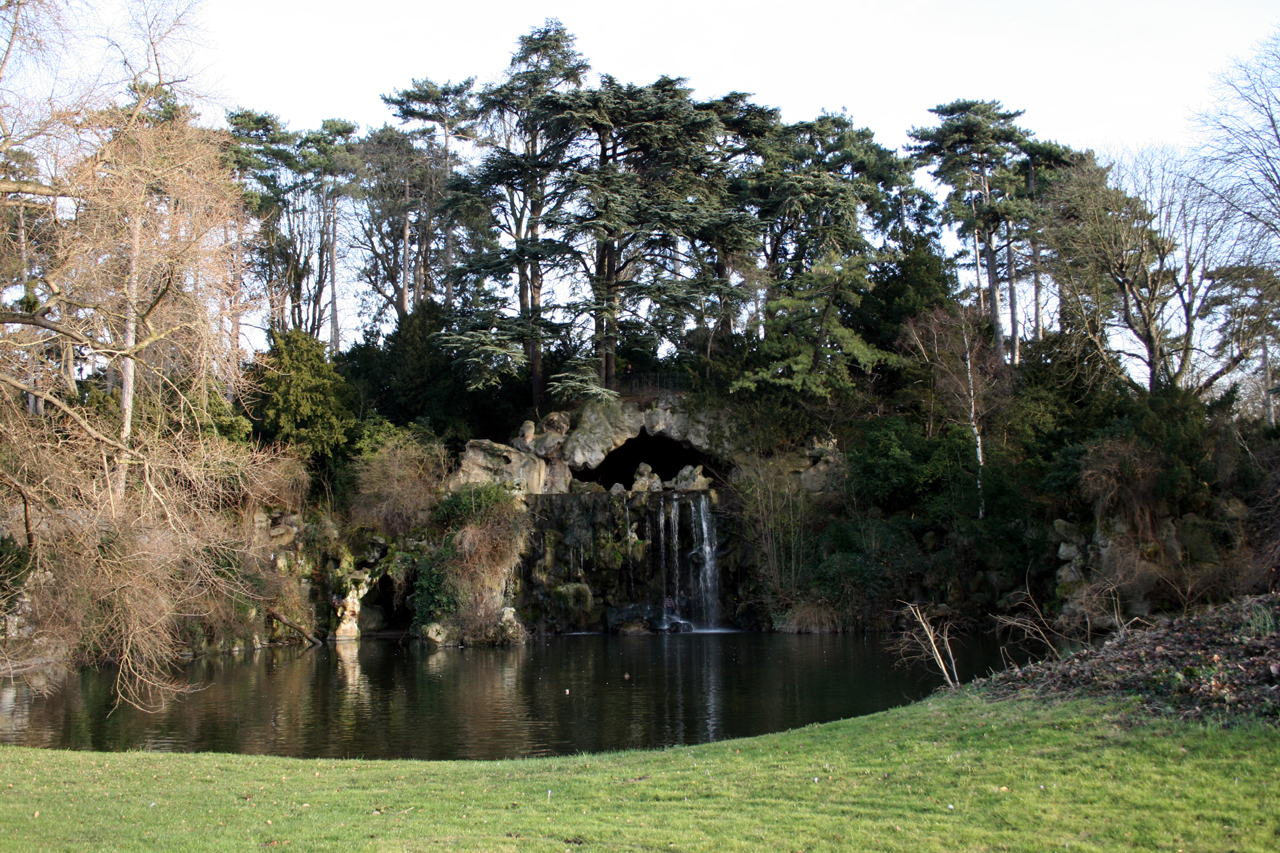
The artificial grand cascade and grotto of the Bois de Boulogne

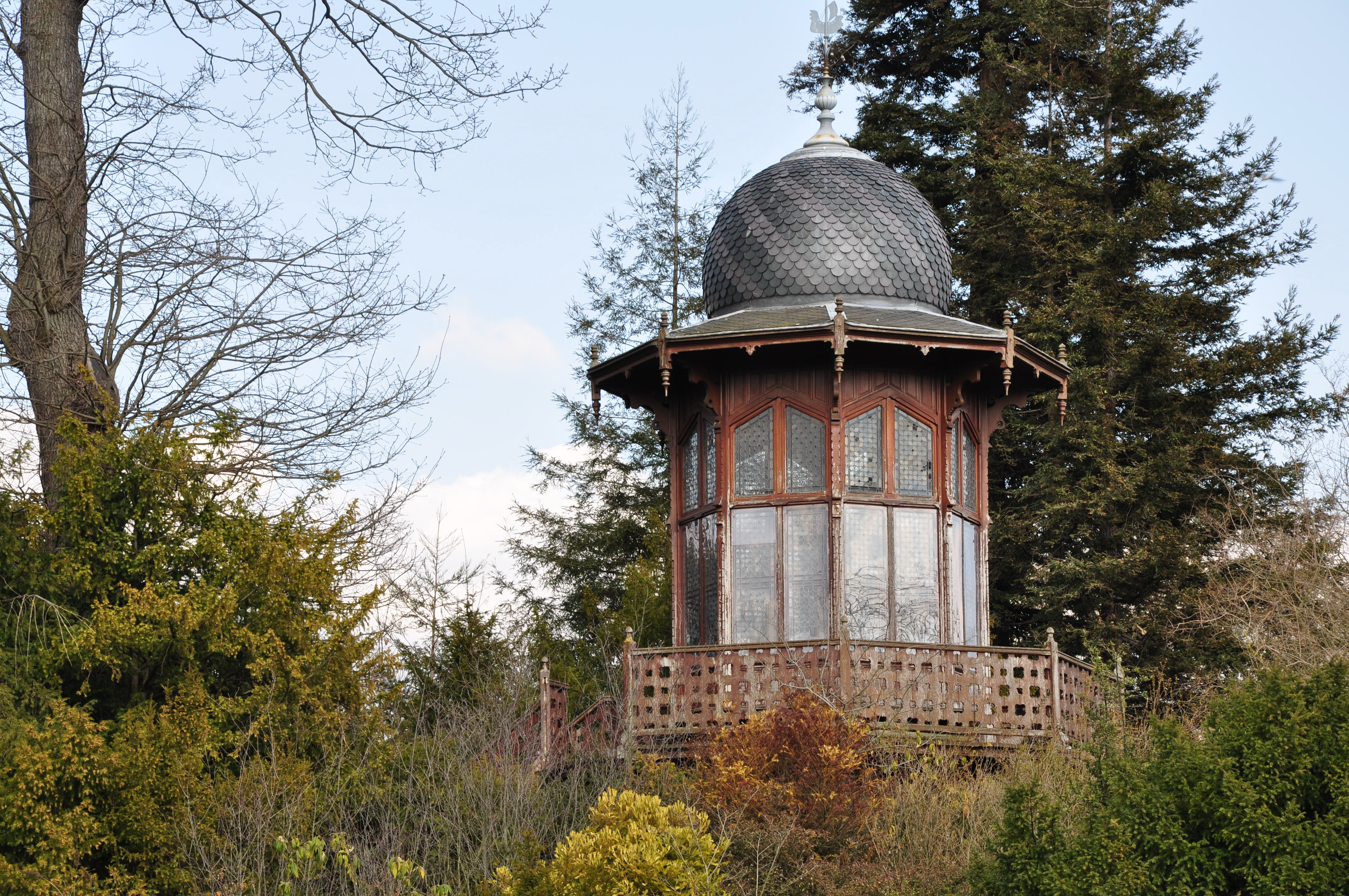
The kiosk of the Emperor, on the island in the lower lake in the Bois de Boulogne, is the only monument in Paris named for Napoleon III.

The Bois de Boulogne was a scrubby forest to the west of the city, where the German, Russian and British occupation armies had camped after Napoleon's defeat and had cut down most of the older trees.

In 1852 Napoleon III had land transferred from the list of Imperial property to the city of Paris, and bought the plots of private land within the park. He had lived long years in exile in London, and had frequently visited London's Hyde Park, with its serpentine lake and winding paths. It became the model for his first major new park. Thousands of workers began digging artificial lakes and brought boulders from the Forest of Fontainebleau to build an artificial cascade. Belgrand, the hydraulic engineer, built a special conduit from the Ourq canal, dug artesian wells, and laid 66 kilometers of pipes to provide water for the future lakes, lawns and flowerbeds. Alphand laid out 95 kilometers of new roads, riding trails and paths winding through the park. The gardeners seeded 273 hectares (670 acres) of lawn and planted 420,000 trees.

The park was also intended to provide recreation for the Parisians; besides the roads for carriages and paths for horses and walking, Davioud built twenty-four chalets and pavilions around the park, which served as restaurants, cafes, theaters, and places of entertainment. Twenty hectares were set aside for a garden and zoo, the Jardin d'Acclimatation. In 1857 one corner of the park became the site of the Hippodrome de Longchamp, the city's most important horse racing track. During the winter, the lake became a popular destination for ice-skating. From its opening, the park was full of Parisians of all classes.

=== The Bois de Vincennes (1860–1865) ===
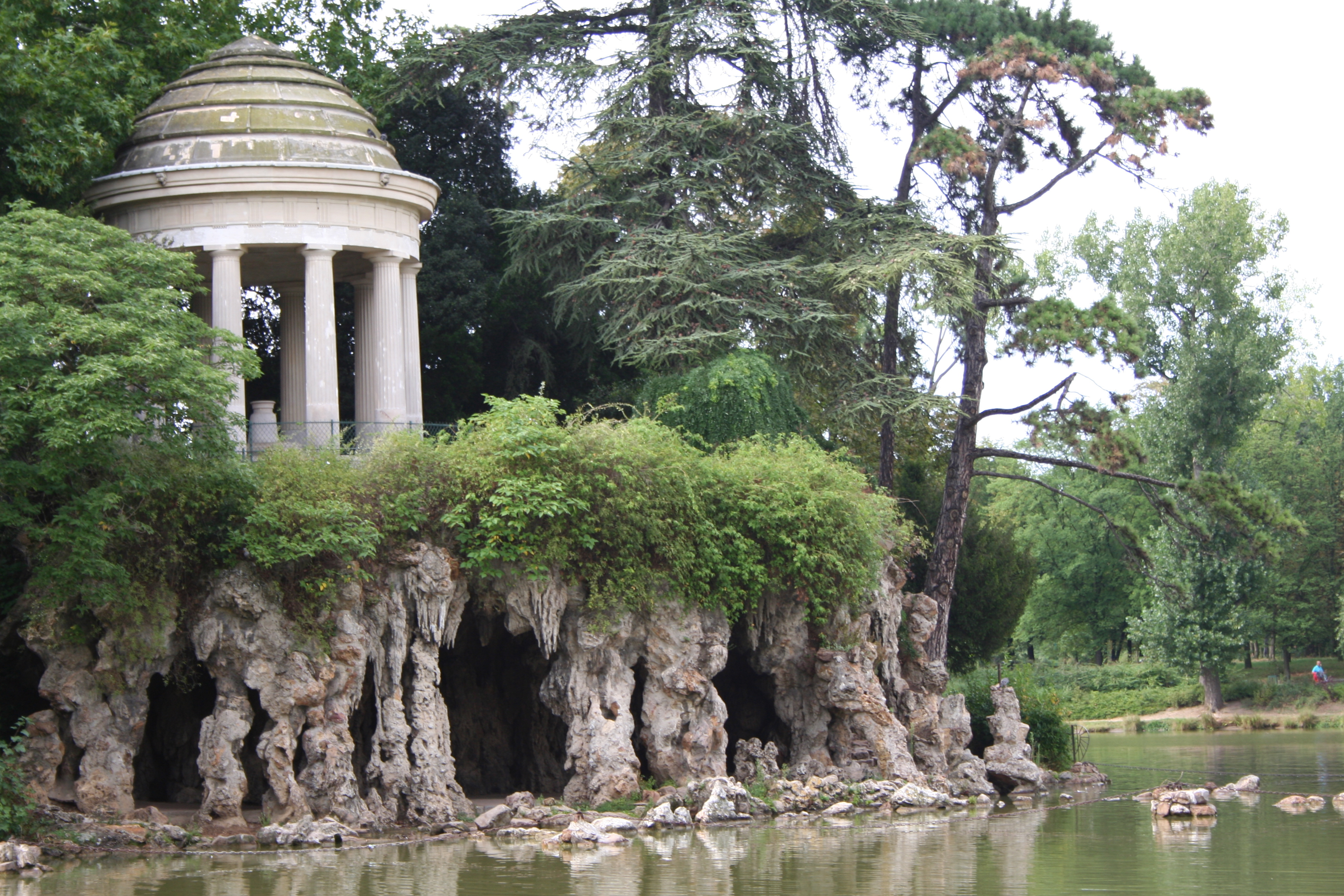
The Temple of Love on Lac Daumesnil in the Bois de Vincennes (1865)

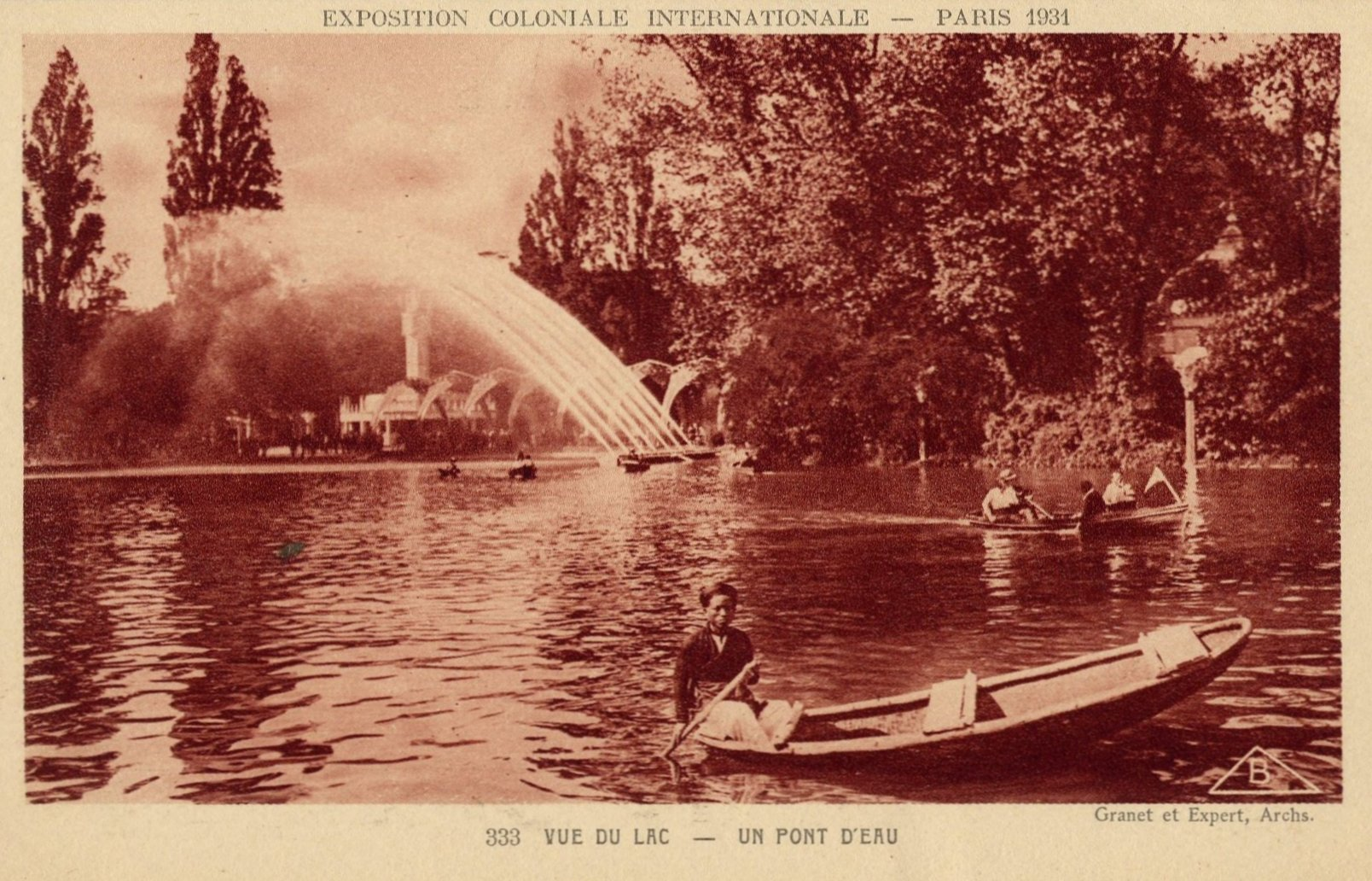
Fountains in the Bois de Vincennes during the 1931 Colonial Exposition

The Bois de Vincennes was originally a royal hunting preserve and the site of an important royal residence, the Château de Vincennes, still existing. After Louis XIV moved the royal residence to Versailles, the chateau was neglected. Under Louis XV, the chateau was redesigned, and walking paths were created in the forest. During the French Revolution, the center of the park was turned into a military training ground, with firing ranges for artillery and muskets. During the Restoration, Louis-Philippe took 170 acres of the forest and built barracks and military offices.

In 1860 Napoleon III ceded a large part of the forest to the city of Paris and Alphand began to turn it into a place for relaxation and recreation for the working-class population of eastern Paris. Much of the land in the center of the park was retained by the military, so Haussmann was obliged to buy additional private land around the perimeter of the park, making the Bois de Vincennes much more expensive to build; the Bois de Vincennes cost 12 million francs, while the Bois de Boulogne cost 3.46 million francs. Covering 995 hectares (2,460 acres), it was slightly larger than the Bois de Boulogne, making it the largest park in the city. As he had done in the Bois de Boulogne, Alphand designed and dug twenty-five hectares of lakes, rivers, waterfalls and grottos. The city's chief gardener, Barillet-Deschamps, planted three hundred hectares of lawns and one hundred forty-eight hectares of flower beds. The hydraulic engineer Belgrand built a water channel from the Marne River, and pumps to hoist the water up thirty-five meters to a lake in the park, which served to water the park and to fill the lakes, streams and cascades. Davioud decorated the new park with fantasy temples, cafes kiosks and chalets. The park was completed with the addition of a racetrack, the Hippodrome de Vincennes, in 1863, a public firing range for pistols, rifles, and archery; and the Imperial farm, with orchards, fields, sheep and cows, so the urban residents of Paris could see a real farm at work

The Bois de Vincennes was the site of the cycling events of the 1900 Olympics, in a forty-thousand seat stadium built especially for that event. The Park was also the site of two large Colonial Expositions, in 1907 and 1931, celebrating the peoples and products France's empire. Several vestiges of the exhibits remain, including the old pavilion of French Cameroon, which was converted into a Buddhist temple and Institute in 1977. The Paris zoo was built for the 1931 exposition, and moved in 1934 to its present location in the east of the park, next to a sixty-five meter high man-made mountain, inhabited by alpine goats.

=== Parc des Buttes Chaumont (1864–1867) ===
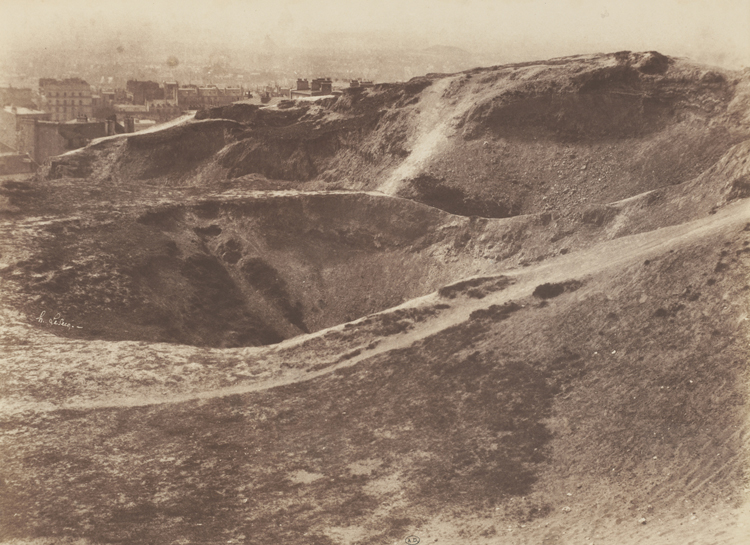
The site of the Parc des Buttes Chaumont in 1852

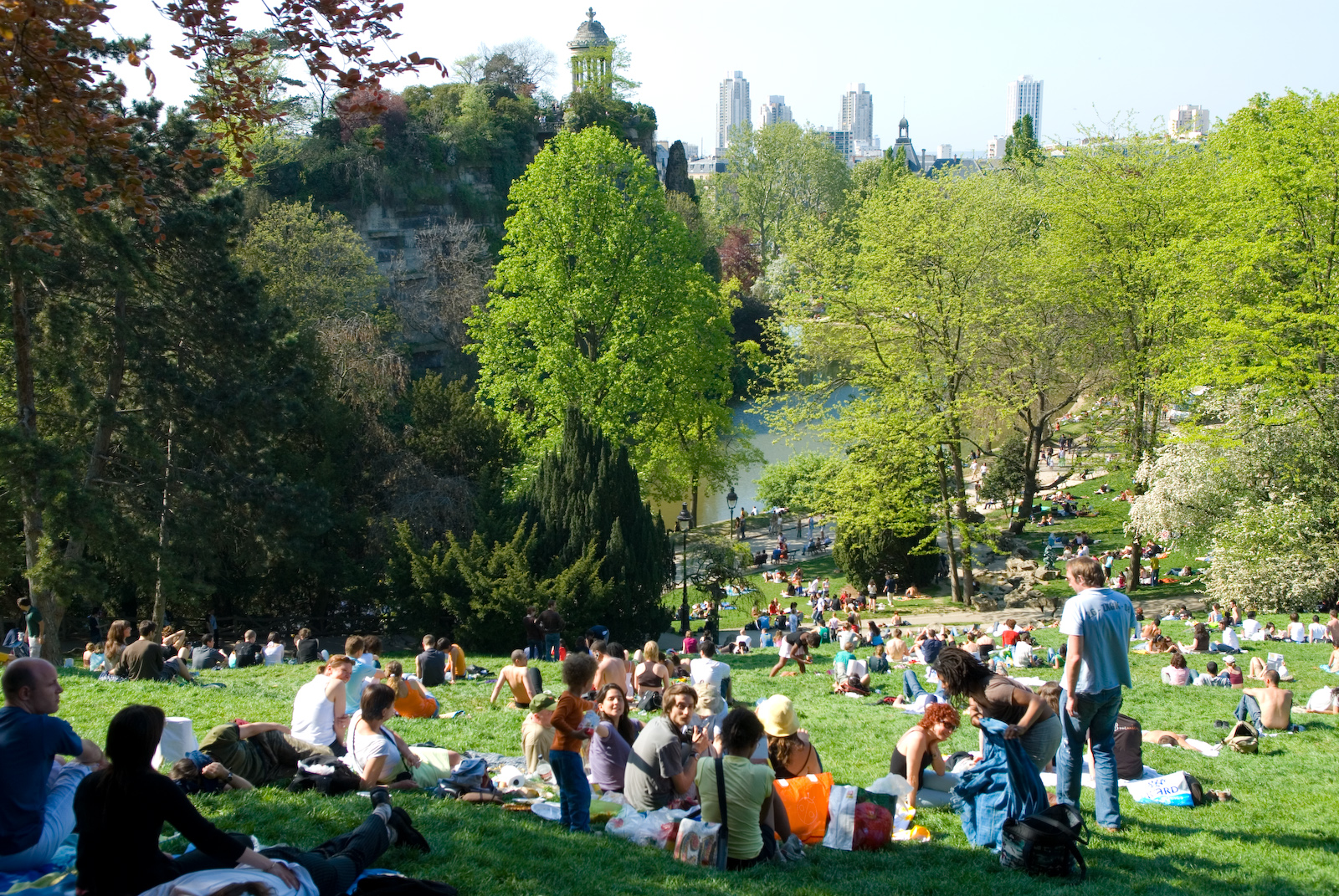
The lawns of the Parc des Buttes Chaumont on a sunny day

The Parc des Buttes Chaumont, twenty-seven hectares in size in the north of the city, was an unpromising site for a garden; The soil was very poor, and the land bare of vegetation; its original name was "Chauvre-mont" or "bald hill." In medieval times, it was close the site of the gibbet, where the corpses of excited criminals were displayed. From 1789 it served as a sewage dump, and much of the site had been used as a stone quarry

Alphand began to build in 1864. Two years and one thousand workers were required simply to terrace the site and to bring in two hundred thousand square meters of topsoil. A small railroad line was built to carry the earth. Gunpowder was used to blast the rock, and to sculpt the 50-meter-high central promontory. A 2-hectare (4.9-acre) lake was dug at the foot of the promontory. Alphand laid out five kilometers of paths and roads, and Belgrand installed pumps and pipes to hoist water from the Ourq canal to supply the cascades and lake and water the new gardens. Davioud designed a grotto, using the tunnels of the old stone quarry; a circular temple, based on the Temple of Vesta, Tivoli, to crown the promontory, as well as four bridges to span the lake. The park opened on April 1, 1867, the opening day of the Paris Universal Exposition.

An urban legend says that bodies of Communards killing during the suppression of the 1871 Paris Commune are entombed inside the old stone quarries in the Promentory. In fact 754 bodies were placed there briefly for a short time after the fighting ended, but were buried in the city cemeteries soon afterwards.

=== Parc Montsouris (1865–1878) ===
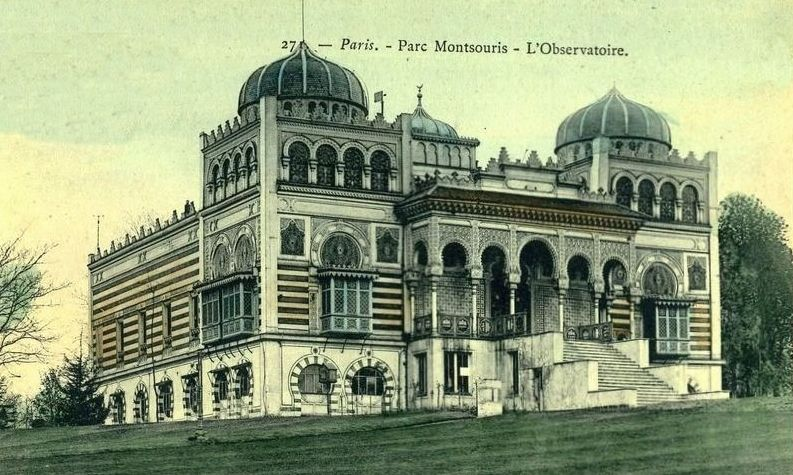
The Palais de Bardo was a landmark of Parc Montsouris until burned down in 1991.

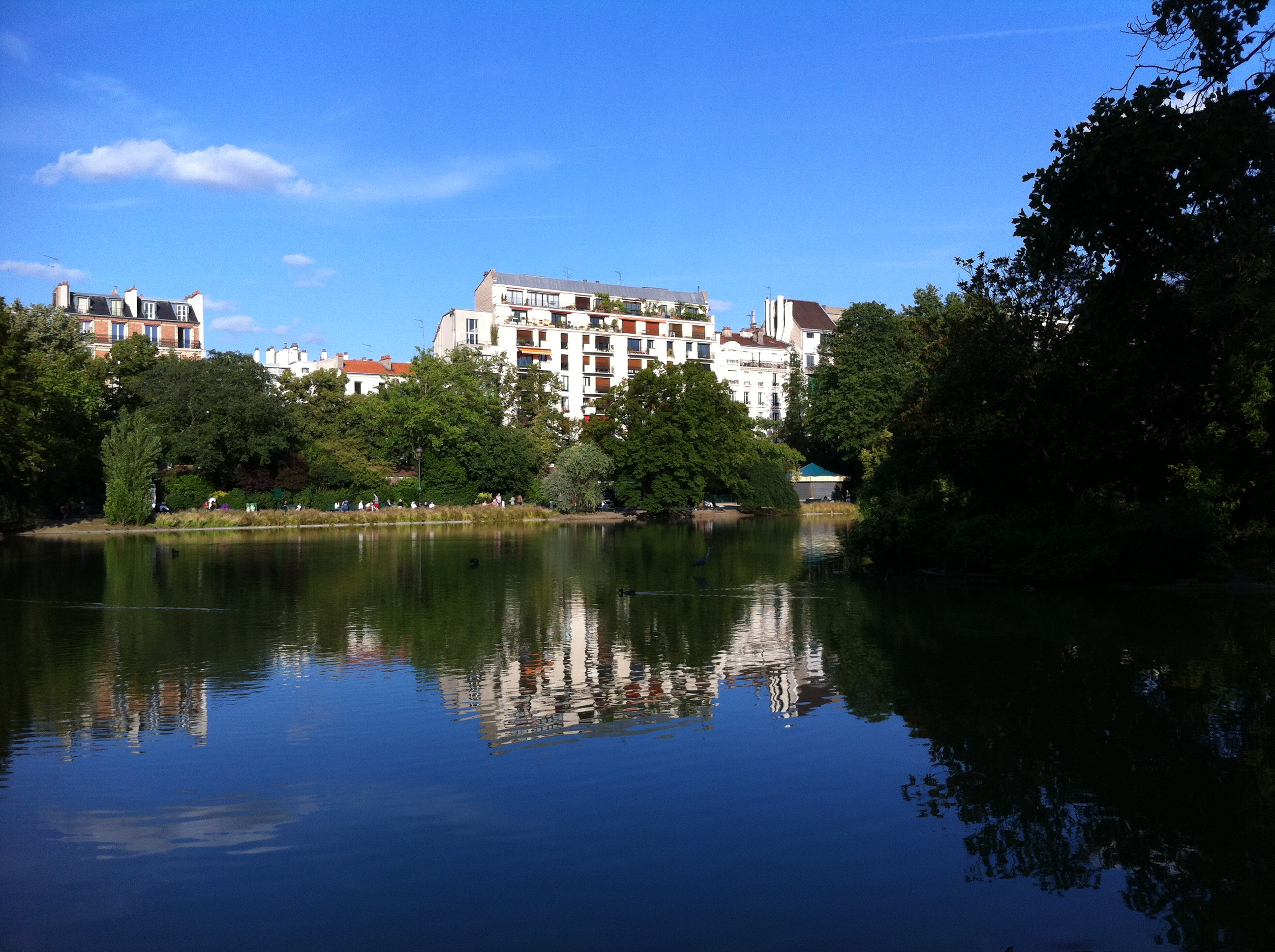
The lake of Parc Montsouris

Parc Montsouris was the last of the four large parks created by Napoleon III at the four cardinal points of the compass around Paris. It was precisely south of the exact center of Paris- a monument in the park placed by Napoleon I indicated the prime meridian which French maps used until 1911, instead of Greenwich, as the zero degree of longitude. Napoleon III decreed to construction of the park in 1865, but purchasing the land took time, and work did not begin until 1867. Work was also delayed because several hundred corpses that had been placed in the catacombs of Paris, part of which lay under the park, had to be moved. The park was inaugurated in 1869, but was not actually finished until 1878, under Alphand, who continued his work as the Director of Public Works of Paris under the French Third Republic.

Parc Montsouris, 15.5 hectares (38 acres) in area, had all the elements of a classical Second Empire garden in a smaller space; a lake, a cascade, winding paths, a cafe, a guignol theater, lawns and flower beds. It also had a remarkable folly: the Palais de Bardo, a reduced-scale replica of the summer residence of the beys of Tunis, which had originally been part of the Paris Universal Exposition of 1867. Made of wood and stucco, it was installed in the center of the park, where it served as a weather station, but gradually suffered from vandalism and neglect. It burned down in 1991, and was not replaced.

== Gardens of the Belle Epoque and the Universal Expositions (1871–1914) ==
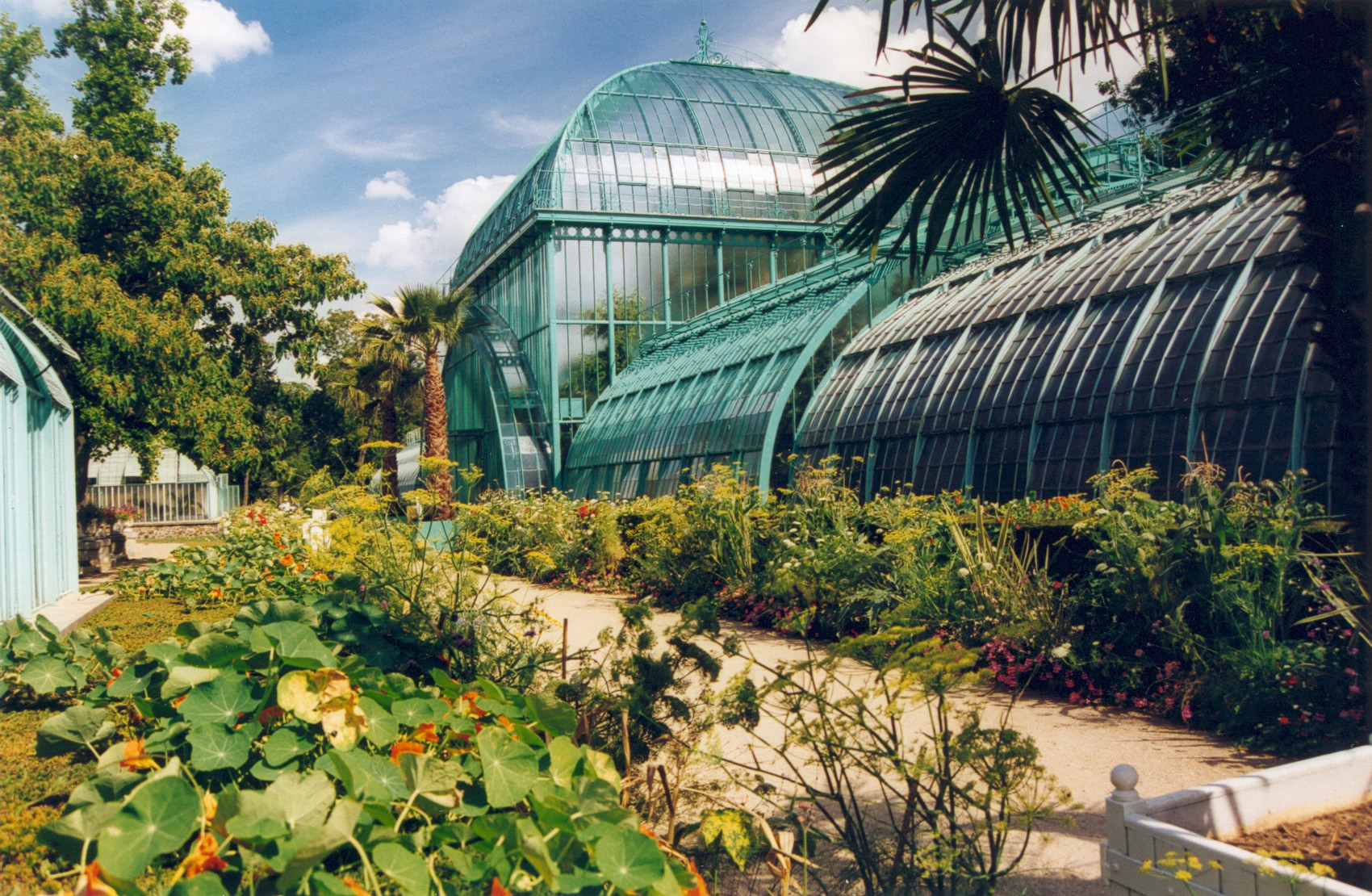
The Serres d'Auteuil (1898), next to the Bois de Boulogne, provide trees, shrubs and flowers for all the parks of Paris.

Napoleon III was captured by the Germans during the Franco-Prussian War of 1870 and the Second Empire was replaced by the French Third Republic. The new government named Jean-Charles Adolphe Alphand the Director of Public Works of Paris, and he continued the work he had begun under the Emperor and Haussmann. He finished Parc Montsouris and several smaller squares, including square Boucicault (now Square Maurice-Gardette) and square d'Anvers (1877). Much of Alphand's abundant energy was devoted to the building of the universal expositions of 1878 and 1889, each of which included extensive gardens. He was in charge of building the Paris Exposition of 1889, including the construction of the Eiffel Tower. It was his last great project before his death in 1891.

The construction of new squares and gardens was carried during the Third Republic by one of Alphand's protégés, the architect Jean Camille Formigé. While he did not undertake any new large parks on the scale of those of Alphand, he built a series of new squares in the Paris neighborhoods; square Ferdinand Brunot; square Frédéric Lemaître; square Adolphe Chérioux; square du Vert-Galant; square des Epinettes, and the square des Arènes de Lutèce. His most impressive accomplishment was the Serres d'Auteuil (1898), an ensemble of greenhouses which provided flowers, trees and shrubs for all of the parks of Paris.

=== Jardins du Trocadéro (1878–1937) ===
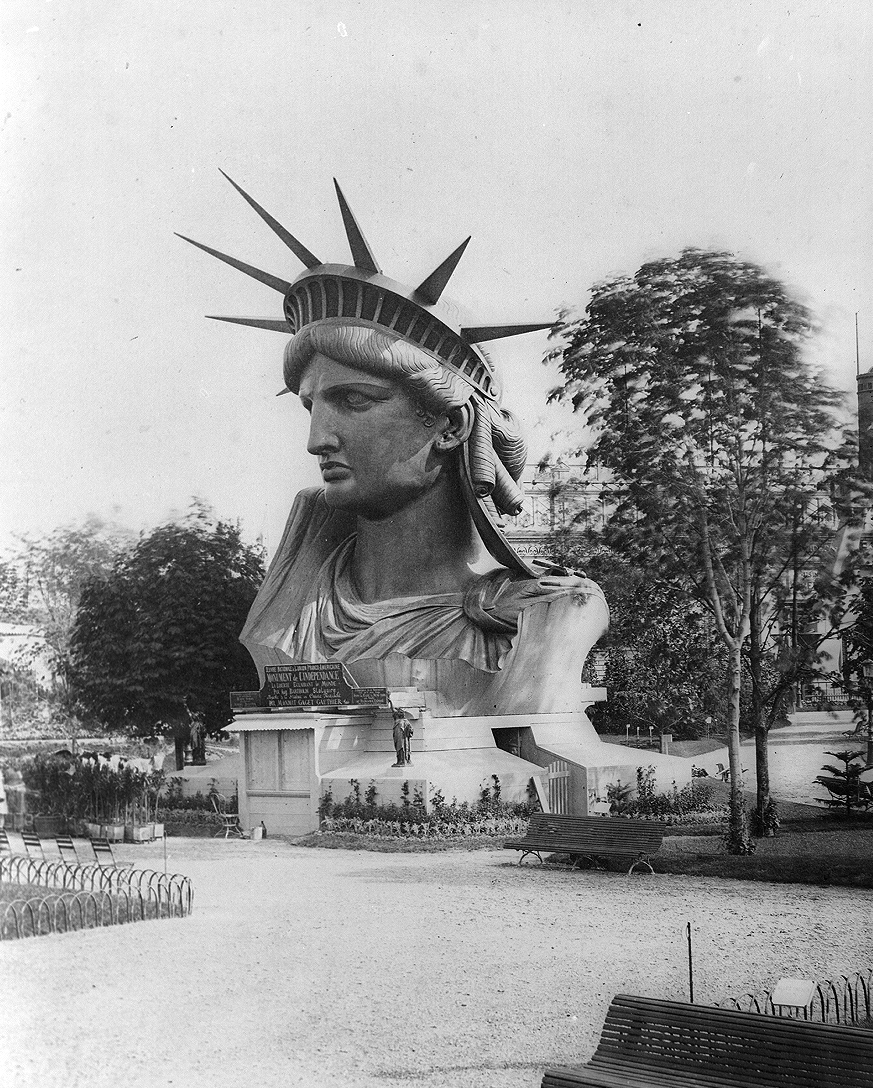
At the Exposition of 1878, the gardens of the Trocadero displayed the full-size head of the Statue of Liberty, before the statue was completed and shipped to New York.

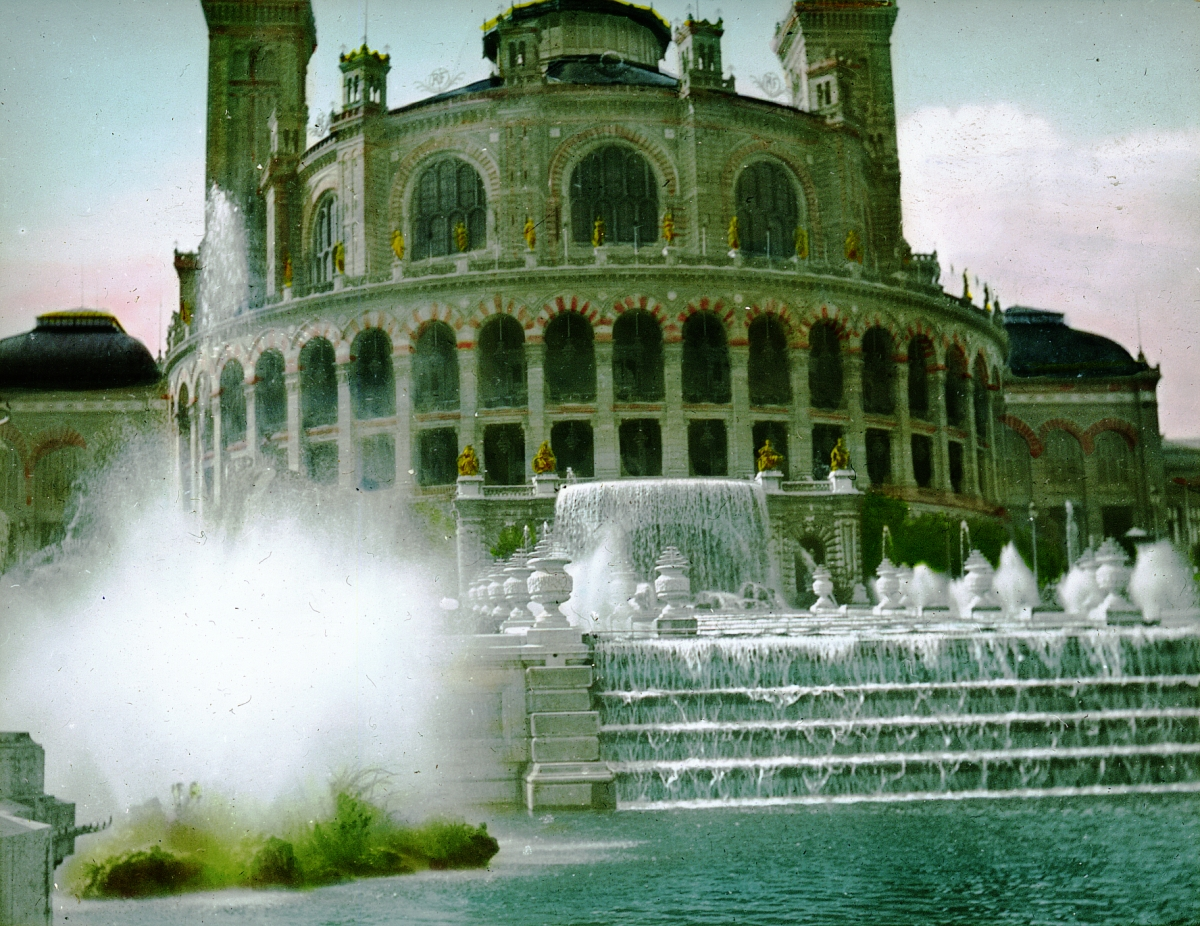
The Trocadero Palace and gardens at the Paris Universal Exposition of 1900

The Trocadero had originally been the site of a country house of Catherine de' Medici, then of a monastery, destroyed during the French Revolution. Napoleon had projected to build a palace for his son there; King Louis XVIII planned to build a monument there to the Battle of Trocadero in 1823. Under Napoleon III, Alphand had built a basin, paths radiating outwards, a large lawn, and a stairway descending from the hill down the edge of the river.

When the site was chosen in 1876 for the part of the Paris Universal Exposition of 1878, the architects Gabriel Davioud and Jules Bordais were chosen to construct the Palais de Trocadero, a massive temporary structure in a vaguely Moorish style, with large rotunda flanked by two towers, with curving wings on either side. The gardens, designed by Alphand, occupied the slope from the Palace on the top of the hill down to the Seine. The center of the garden was occupied by a long series of cascades ending in a large basin at the bottom at the bottom of the hill. The cascade was lined with statues of animals and of female figures representing the five continents (the statues now decorate the square next to the Musée D'Orsay). The largest piece of statuary in the garden was the head of the Statue of Liberty (formally Liberty Enlightening the World), made before the rest of the statue, and displayed in order to raise funds for its completion.

When the Exposition was finished, the gardens were redesigned into an English landscape garden; groves of trees were planted, winding paths laid out, and a stream and grotto were constructed. The gardens remained in place for the Paris Universal Exposition of 1889. For the Paris International Exposition of 1937 the palace was replaced by a modernist structure and the fountains were rebuilt, but the picturesque gardens on the hillsidewere left as they were. (See parks and gardens of the 1930s below).

=== Champ-de-Mars (1908–1927) ===
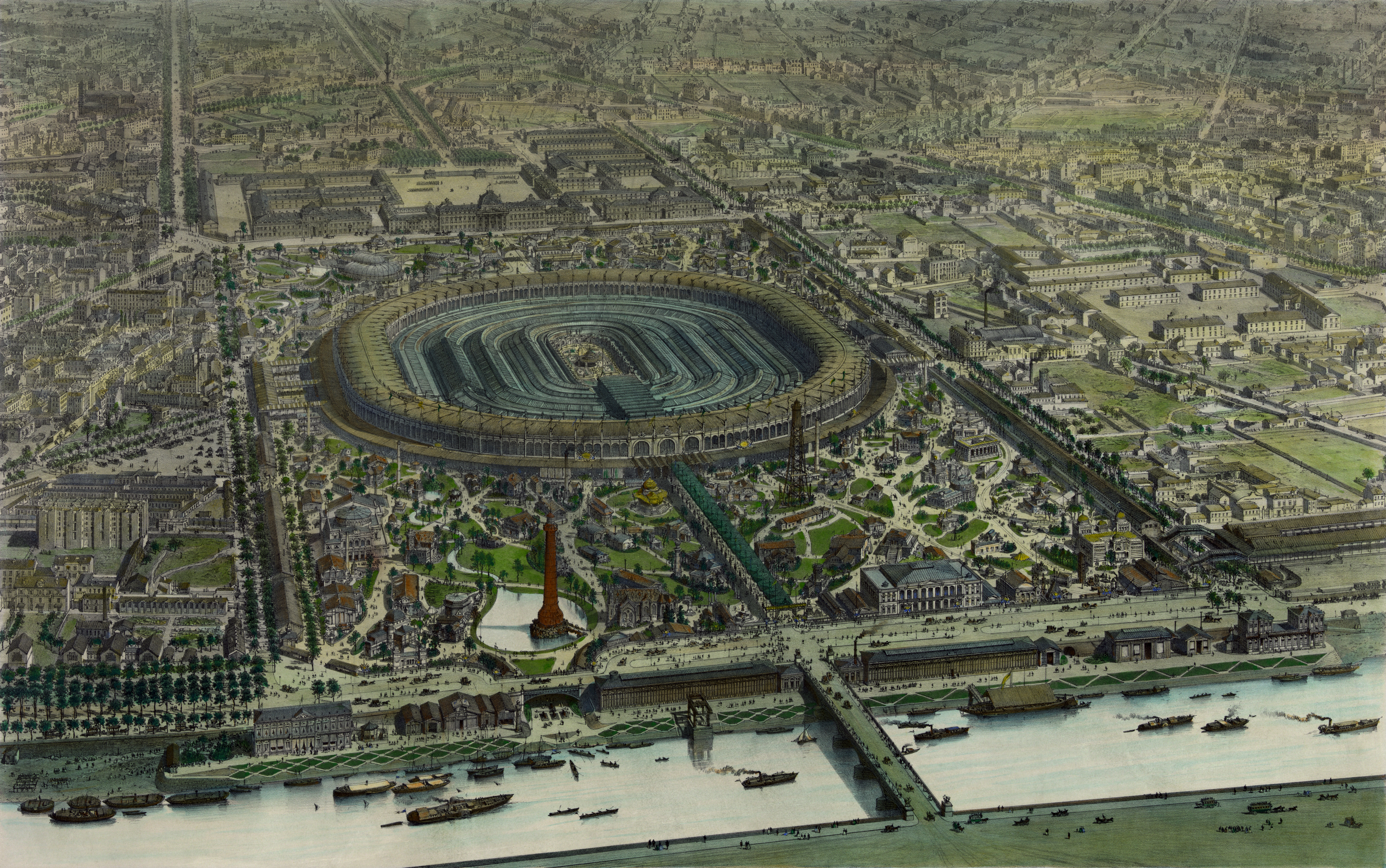
The gardens surrounding the huge exposition hall of the 1867 Paris Universal Exposition, held on the Champ-de-Mars

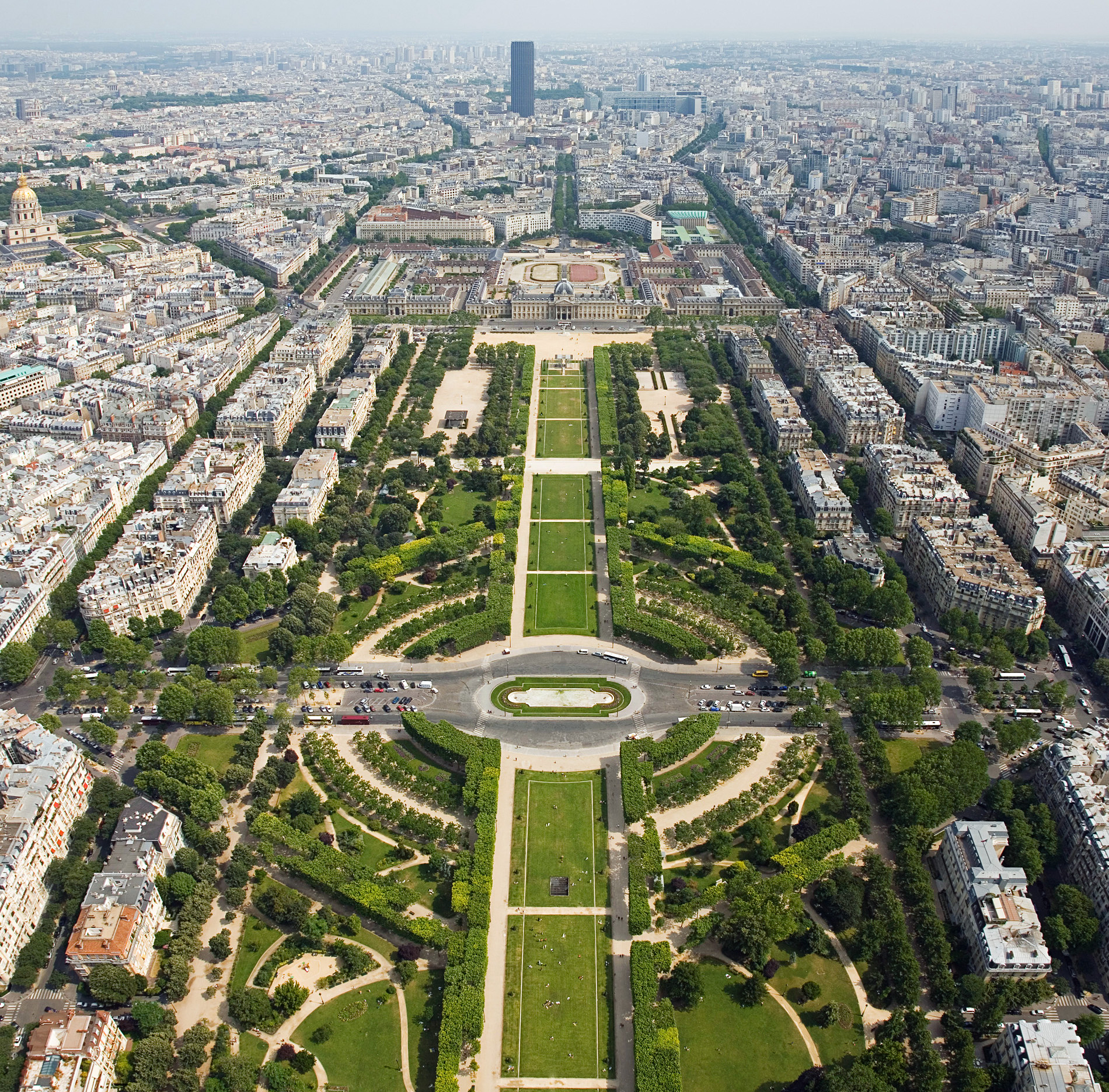
The Champ-de-Mars gardens (1908–1927) seen from the Eiffel Tower

The Champ de Mars, 24.5 hectares (61 acres) in area, was created in 1765 as a parade ground and training field for the neighboring École Militaire. During the French Revolution it was the site of large patriotic festivals, including the Festival of the Supreme Being conducted by Robespierre in 1794. It was surrounded by a moat and not open to the public until 1860, when Napoleon III filled in the moat and planted trees along the borders, but it still remained the property of the Army. It was the site of the 1867 Paris Universal Exposition, which featured a large domed pavilion in the center, surrounded a garden, which itself surrounded by a large oval-shaped gallery. The rest of the Champ de Mars was occupied by exposition halls and extensive landscape gardens, designed by Alphand.

The Champ-de-Mars served again as the main site of the Paris Universal Exposition of 1878. A gigantic palace of glass and iron 725 meters long occupied he center of the park, surrounded by gardens designed by Alphand. For the Paris Universal Exposition of 1889, celebrating the centenary of the French Revolution, Alphand placed the Eiffel Tower in the center, near the monumental Gallery of Machines. The Exposition included a Palace of Fine Arts and a Palace of Liberal Arts. The space around the Eiffel tower and between the galleries and palaces was filled by a large landscape garden, which extended along the axis between the Eiffel Tower and the Seine, and ended at the river at a colossal fountain with a group of allegorical figures, called The City of Paris Illuminates the World with her Torch. The fountain was lit at night by electric lights shining up from the water through plates of colored glass.

In 1889, the Champ-de-Mars was formally transferred from the French army to the City of Paris. It was used once more for the Paris Universal Exposition of 1900, and, then, beginning in 1909 until 1927, it was developed into a public park. It was an unusual site; it was the only large park in Paris not enclosed with a fence, and it was crossed by three major boulevards. The huge Gallery of Machines, which occupied much of the site, was demolished in 1909. The park architect was Jean Camille Formigé (1849–1926), a protégé of Alphand. He used the long central axis from the Eiffel Tower to École Militaire to create a formal and symmetrical park in the French style. The long central axis was lined with paths and rows of trees; a basin with fountains was placed in the center; playgrounds were built along the sides. The original gardens from the 1889 exhibition, around the Eiffel Tower, were preserved in their original form and can still be seen. Like other French formal gardens, it was best seen from above, in this case from the top of the Eiffel Tower.

== Parks and gardens of the early 20th century ==
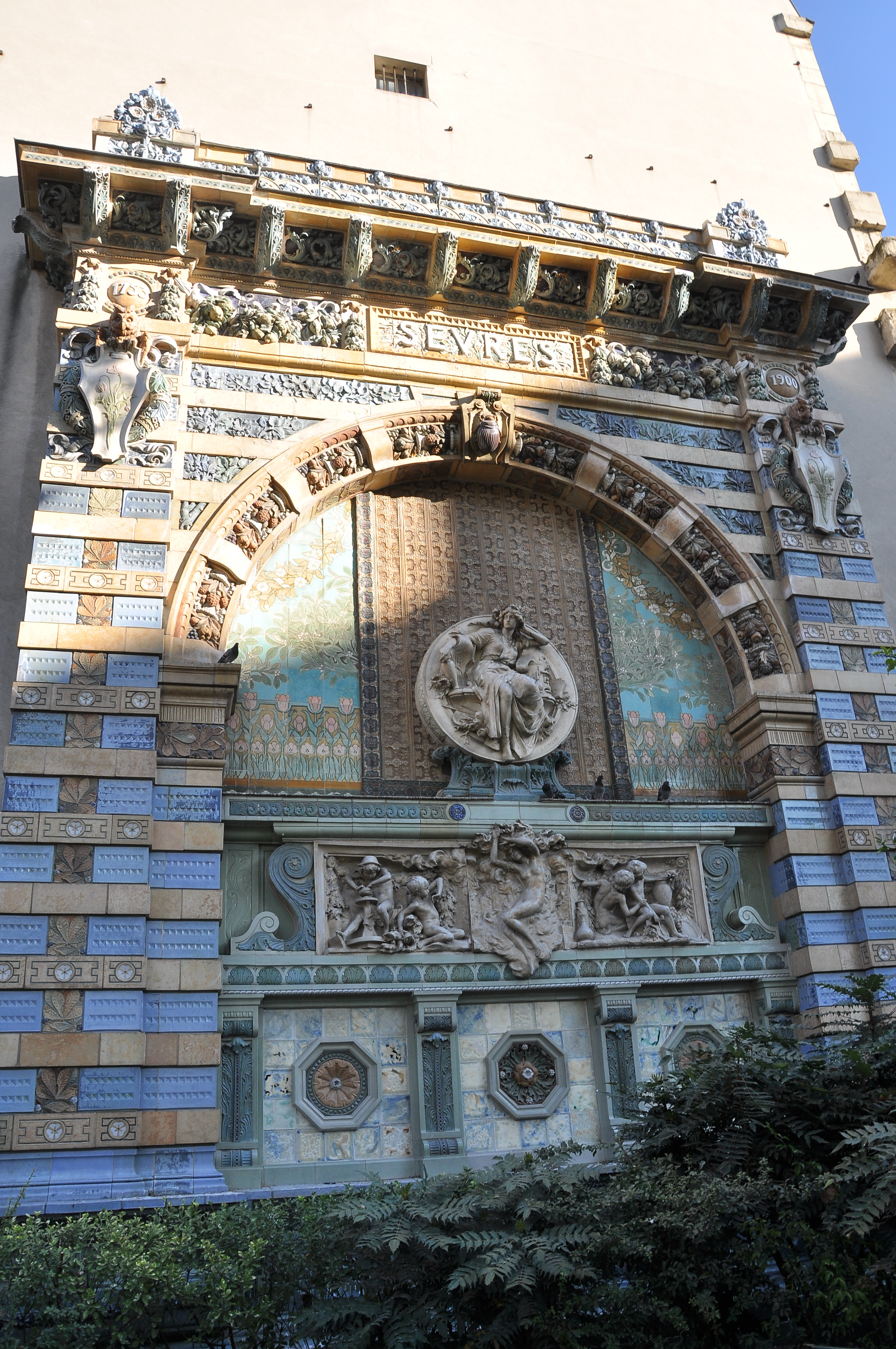
The monumental gateway of the pavilion of the Sèvres porcelain factory at the Paris Universal Exposition of 1900 is found in Square Laurent-Prache, on the south side of the church of Saint-Germain-des-Pres.

Several small parks were created between 1901 and the beginning of World War II. Square Laurent-Prache was created in 1901 on the north side of the Church of Saint-Germain-des-Pres, on the site of the old Abbey of Saint-Germain, which was destroyed during the French Revolution in 1790. The wall of the church next to the park is decorated with gothic arcades taken from the destroyed Chapel of the Virgin. The centerpiece of the park today is a bronze head made by Pablo Picasso in 1959, in homage to the poet Apollinaire.

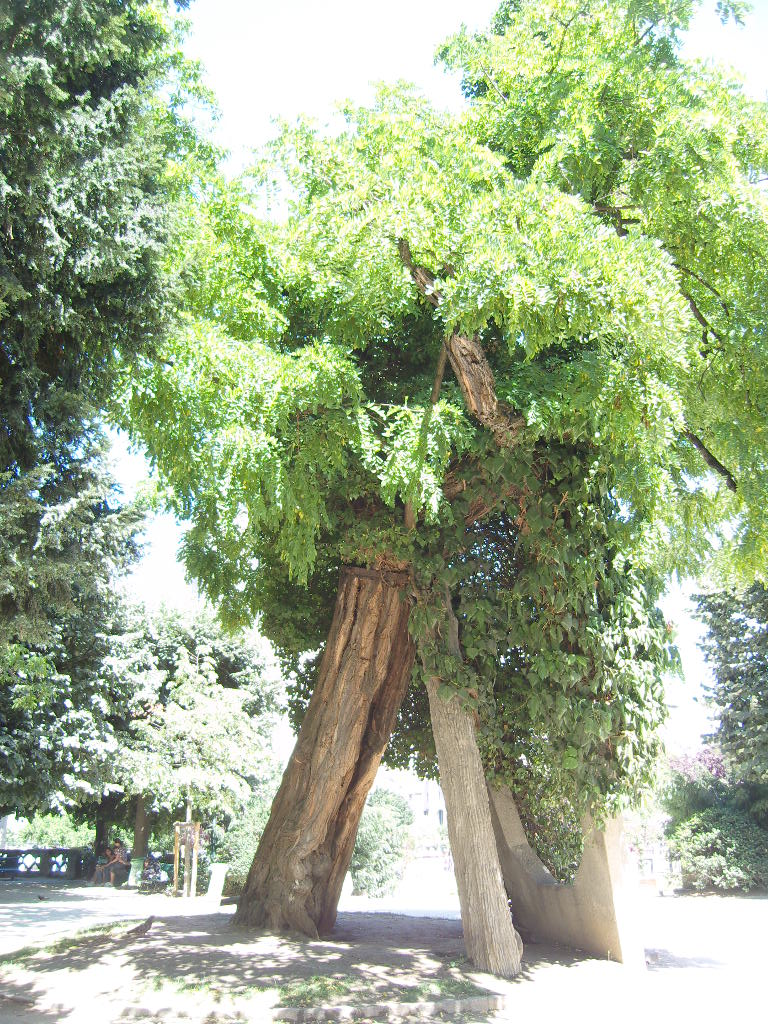
The oldest tree in Paris, an acacia planted in 1601, found in Square René-Viviani

Square Félix-Desruelles was built in the same year along the south wall of the church. The little square is dominated by a colorful enameled gateway of the Pavilion of the Sèvres porcelain factory from the Paris Universal Exposition of 1900.

Square René-Viviani, created in 1928, is located next to the church of Saint-Julien-le-Pauvre, across the Seine from the Cathedral of Notre-Dame-de-Paris. Its most famous feature is the oldest living tree in Paris, a robinier, a variety of acacia, which was planted there in 1601 by the botanist Jean Robin. The park also contains a medieval well and fragments of gothic architecture from Notre-Dame Cathedral, taken out during its 19th-century restoration.

=== Gardens of Sacré-Cœur (1924–1929) ===
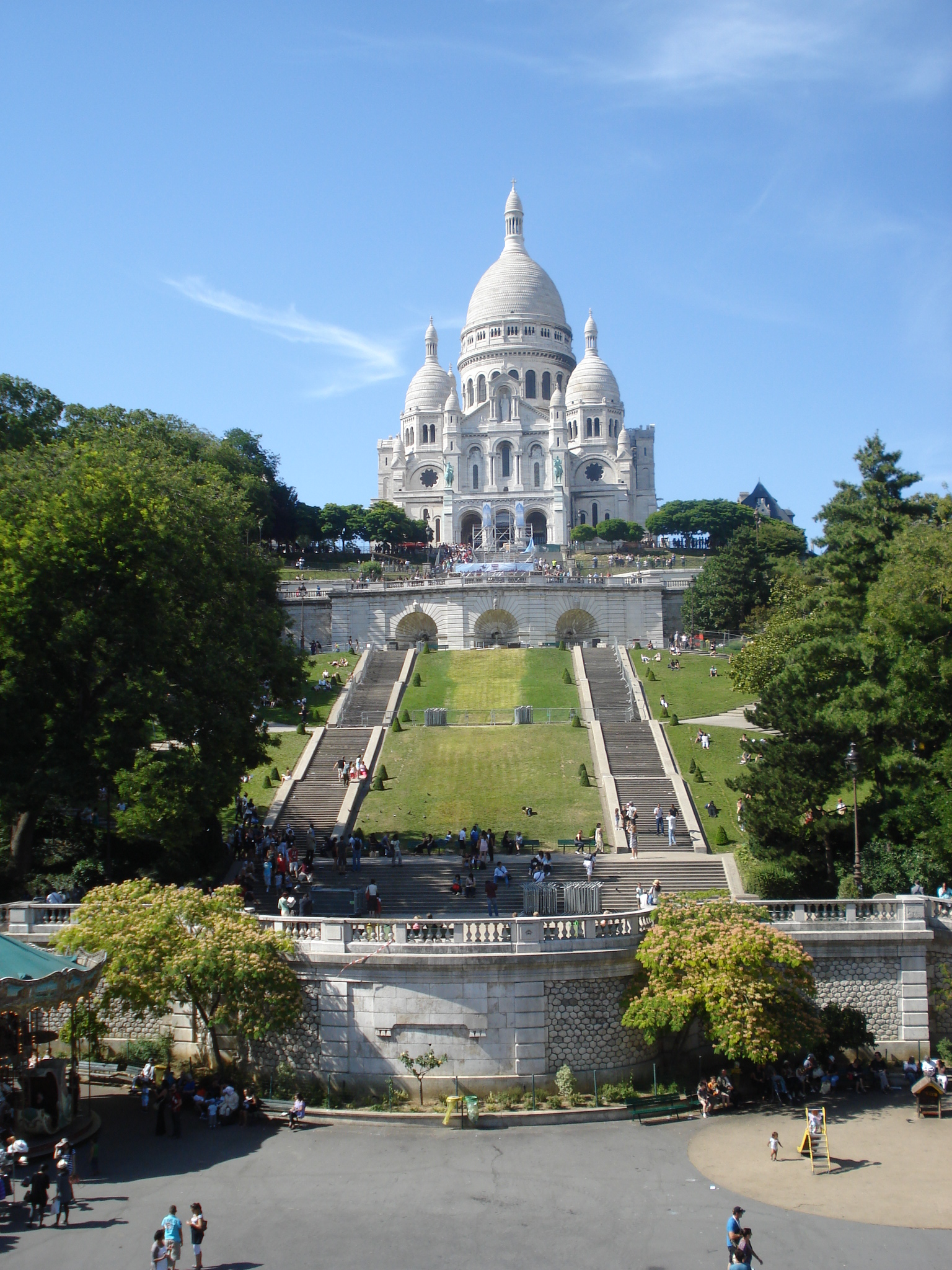
The gardens below the Basilica of Sacré-Cœur

The building of Basilica of Sacré-Cœur at the top of Montmartre was first proposed after the 1870 defeat of France in the Franco-Prussian War, It was also the place where the Paris Commune began in March 1871 with the killing of two French generals by mutinous soldiers of the Paris National Guard. Alphand's plan called for a park that would descend eighty meters from the parvis in front of the church to the street at the bottom of the hill. The architect Jean-Camille Formigé designed a park with a dramatic and unobstructed approach to the church from the bottom of the hill; he designed two terraces, connected by stairways and by curving horseshoe-shaped ramps, lined by trees. Formigés plan also called for a cascade and fountains parallel to the stairways, but these were never built. The work on the church began in the 1880s, but proceeded very slowly, because of the difficulty of anchoring the church to the hillside, site of a former quarry. The Basilica was not dedicated until 1919. Formigé died in 1926, and the work on the gardens was finished by Léopold Béviére, and dedicated in 1929. The original name of the park was Square Willette, but in 2004, under the socialist government of Mayor Bernard Delenoye, it was renamed Square Louise-Michel, after the anarchist and revolutionary Louise Michel who had played an active role in the Paris Commune.

== Parks and gardens of the 1930s ==
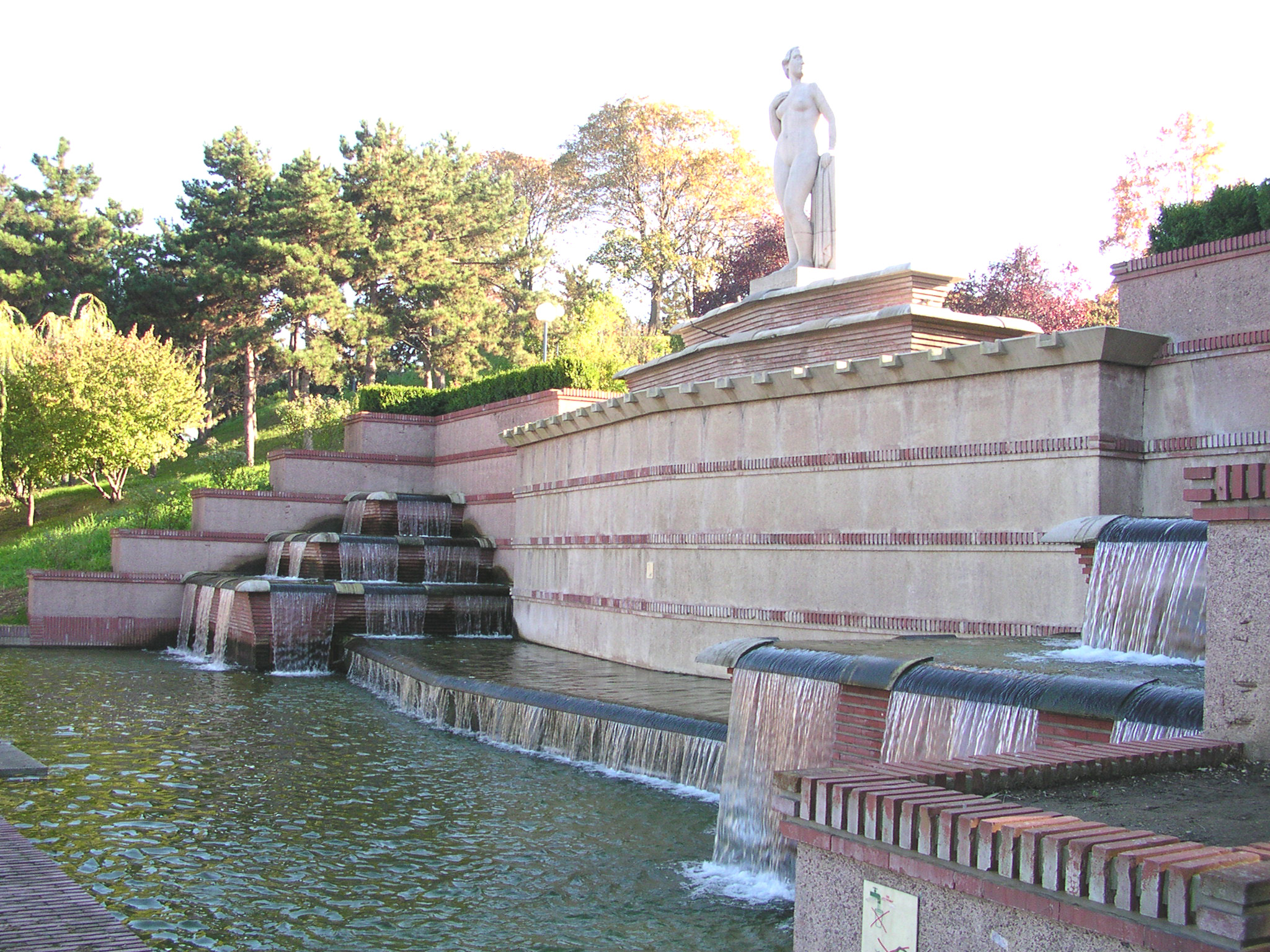
The buffet-d'eau of the Parc de la Butte-du-Chapeau-Rouge (1938)

The 1930s saw an important change in the style of Paris gardens. From 1852 until the end of the 1920s, almost all Paris gardens had been designed by Jean-Charles Adolphe Alphand (1817–1891) and his protégé, Jean Camille Formigé, and they all had a similar picturesque style. Beginning in the 1930s, each Paris garden had a different designer, and the styles were varied. They tended to be more regular and more geometric, more like the classical French formal garden, and made greater use of sculpture, particularly the work of the modernist sculptors of the period. The gardens also tended to be smaller, and were placed in the outer neighborhoods, near the edge of the city.

Several of the new parks were built on land which had been the old fortified zone around the city, a wide strip where no building was allowed, created between 1840 and 1845 by Adolphe Thiers. The land was finally turned over to the city in 1919, and supporters of green space urged that it be turned into a belt of parkland around the city, but instead the government of the Third Republic chose to use much of the land for public housing and industrial sites. Instead of a circular belt of green space, they built a series of small squares, including square du Serment du Koufra (1930) in the 14th arrondissement; square du Docteur-Calmette (1932) in the 15th arrondissement; and square Marcel-Sembat (1931) in the 18th arrondissement.

The most important landscape architects of the period were Léon Azéma, a classically trained artist who won the prestigious Prix de Rome, who designed a dozen squares, including the Parc de la Butte-du-Chapeau-Rouge; and Roger Lardat, who designed series of squares and also redesigned parts of the Bois de Vincennes and the gardens of the Trocadero.

Other notable Paris parks, gardens and squares of the 1930s are those of the Cité Internationale Universitaire de Paris (1921–1939); Parc Kellerman (1939–1950); Square Saint-Lambert (1933); Square Séverine (1933–1934); Square Sarah Berhardt and Square Réjane (1936); Parc Choisy (1937); Square René-Le-Gall (1938); and Square Barye (1938).

=== New Jardins du Trocadéro (1937) ===
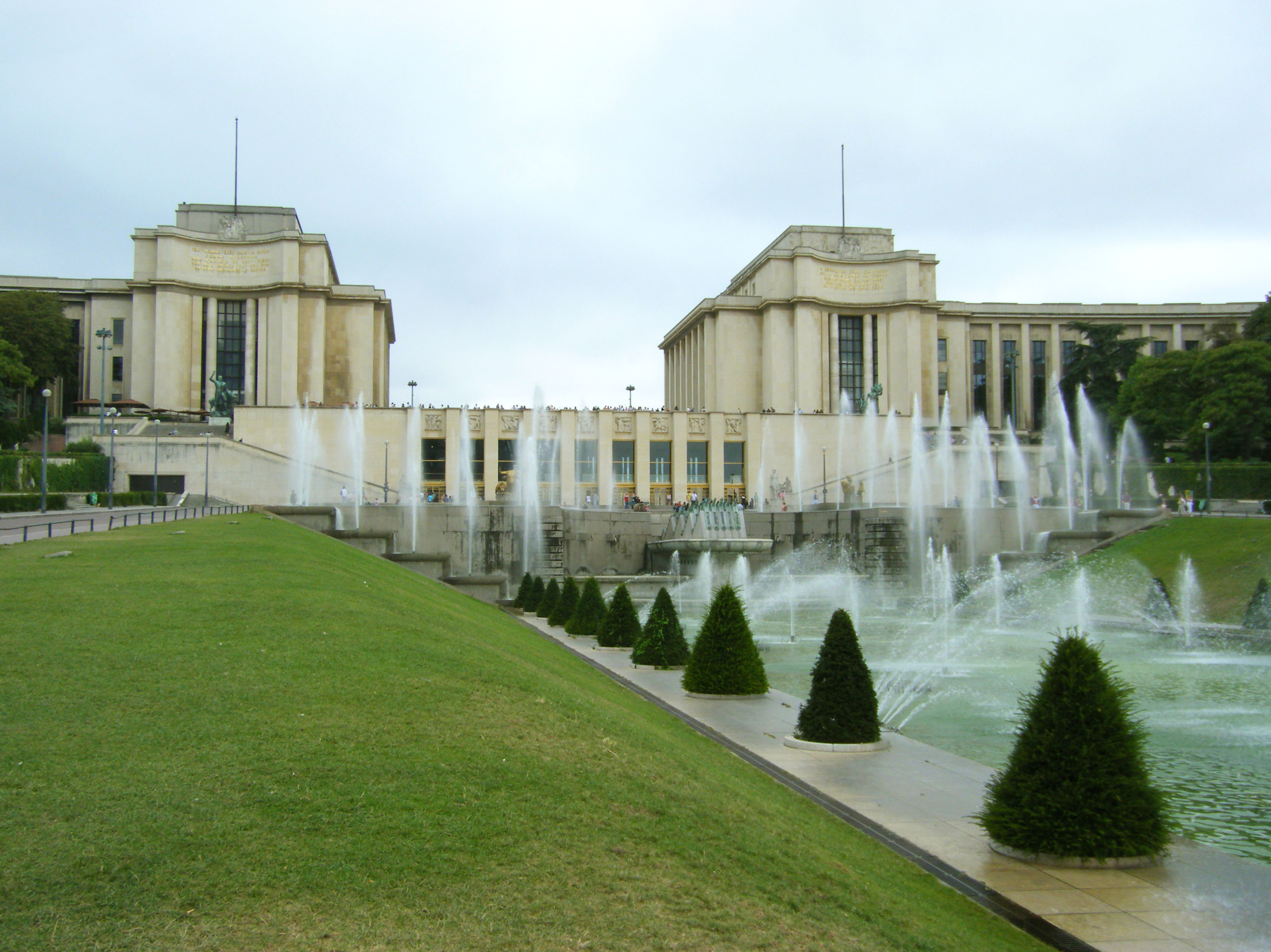
The Palais de Chaillot, and gardens and fountains built for the 1937 Exposition

The major Paris architectural and landscape project of the 1930s was the Exposition Internationale des Arts et Techniques dans la Vie Moderne in 1937, on the hill of Chaillot. The old Palace of Trocadero, which had been used in two previous exhibits, was demolished and replaced by a large terrace with a panoramic view of the Seine and Eiffel Tower, and by the modernist white Palais de Chaillot, with two wings which enveloped the top of the hill. The picturesque landscape gardens on the slopes of the hills, built by Jean-Charles Alphand for the 1878 exposition were preserved, The 21 hectares (52 acres) of new gardens were designed by Léon Azéma and the architects Carlu and Boileau. The central element of the garden became a series of cascades, lined with statues, and a long basin containing rows of fountains and two powerful water cannon. The basins, fountains and dramatic lighting at night were designed by Roger-Henri Expert, who also designed the interior decoration on the famous French ocean liner Normandie. Many of the statues from the exposition, by the leading French sculptors of the time, were kept in place after the Exposition, or found new homes in the other new city parks of the period.

=== Parc de la Butte-du-Chapeau-Rouge (1939) ===
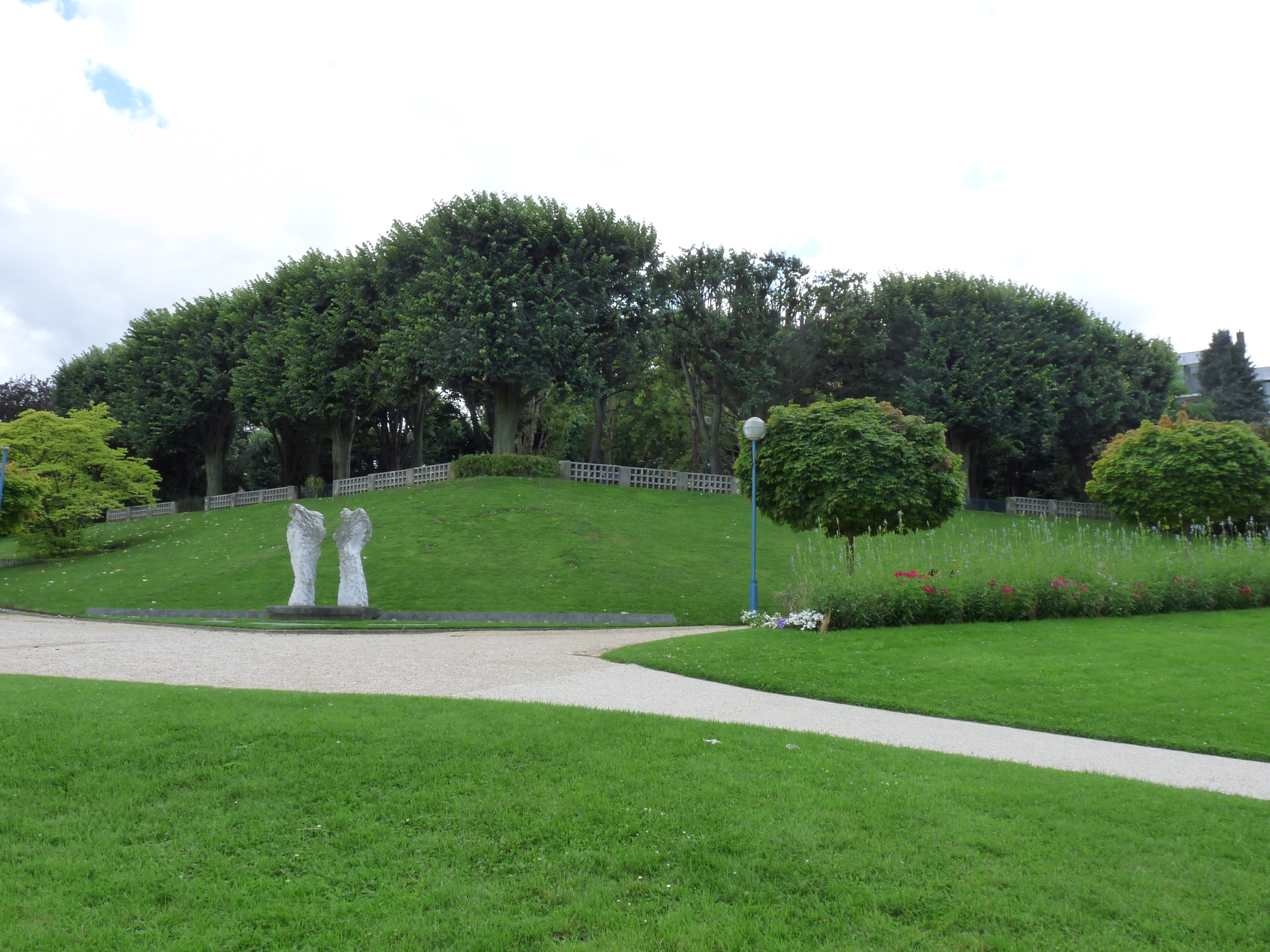
The Square de la Butte-du-Chapeau-Rouge, (1939), in the 19th arrondissement

The Parc de la Butte-du-Chapeau-Rouge, originally known as the Square de la Butte-du-Chapeau-Rouge, in the 19th arrondissement, is one of a series of squares built in the old fortified zone which surrounded the city since the reign of Louis-Philippe. It was designed by Léon Azéma, and was similar to his plan for the gardens of the Trocadero two years earlier. The broad lawns and winding paths took advantage of the steep slope and served as a showcase for sculpture.

The main architectural features are the buffet d'eau, or cascading fountain, at the lower entrance, crowned by a statue of Eve by sculptor Raymond Couvènges (1938) and a classical portico with sculpture serving as the entrance to a playground. At the high end of the park, Two belvederes, reached by winding paths, offer panoramic views of the city.

=== Parc Kellermann (1939–1950) ===
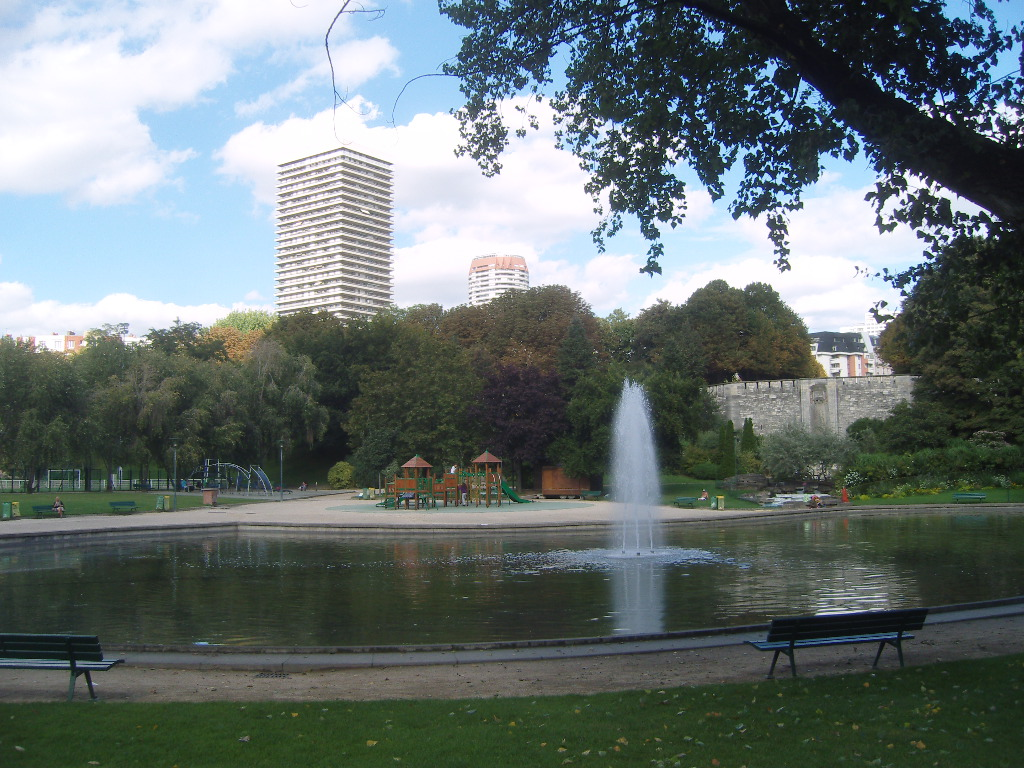
Parc Kellermann (1939–1950), in the 13th arrondissement

Parc Kellermann was built at the same time as the Square de la Butte-du-Chapeau-Rouge, at the southern end of the city, at the edge of the 13th arrondissement. It was slightly larger than Chapeau-Rouge, (5.55 hectares compared with 4.68) which entitled it to be called a park rather than a square. It originally served as a site for several of the several smaller pavilions of the 1937 Exposition. The park was designed by the architect Jacques Gréber, who was architect-in-chief of the 1937 exposition, and who also had a notable career in the United States, where he designed the Benjamin Franklin Parkway in Philadelphia.

The site of the park had two different levels; much of the park was built in the old bed and banks of the Biévre river, now covered over. Gréber merged two different styles; the lower part of the park is picturesque, with a lake, stream, false rocks, groves of trees, winding paths and the other characteristic features of a park of the time of Napoléon III. The upper part, bordered by boulevard Kellermann, is a 1930s combination of classicism and modernism, with a cement portico, two brick excedres decorated with bas-relief sculptures in the 1930s style; a large parterre and basin; and long tree-lined alleys. The upper part of the park today offers exceptional views of the city, but also suffers from the noise of the neighboring highway that circles Paris.

== Parks and gardens of the late 20th century (1940–1980) ==
Following the German occupation of Paris in 1940, the priority shifted from making parks to making playing fields and other sports facilities, following the ideology of Marshal Philippe Pétain and Vichy France regime. In 1939, Paris had twenty hectares of sports fields; In 1941 the Paris government published a plan to build an additional two hundred hectares of sports facilities and playing fields, mostly using the vacant land in the old fortified zone on the edge of the city.

The emphasis given to playgrounds and sports fields continued in the years after the War. The priorities of the successive French governments were the repair of the infrastructure destroyed by the War and building public housing. A number of squares were created, though most of the space was usually devoted to playgrounds rather than gardens. The new parks and squares included Squares Docteurs-Dejerine (1958), Emmanuel-Fleury (1973) and Leon Frapie (1973) in the 20th arrondissement; Squares Emile-Cohl and Georges-Melies (1959) in the 12th arrondissement; the squares around the porte de Champerret in the 17th arrondissement; and the square de la Porte-de-Plaine (1948–1952) in the 15th arrondissement.

Square Andre-Ullmann (1947), in the 17th arrondissement, is one of the typical postwar gardens; symmetrical and austere, it occupies a triangular space, with a pavilion with a rotunda in one corner, two alleys of plane trees, a central green, and bushes and shrubs carved into geometric shapes.

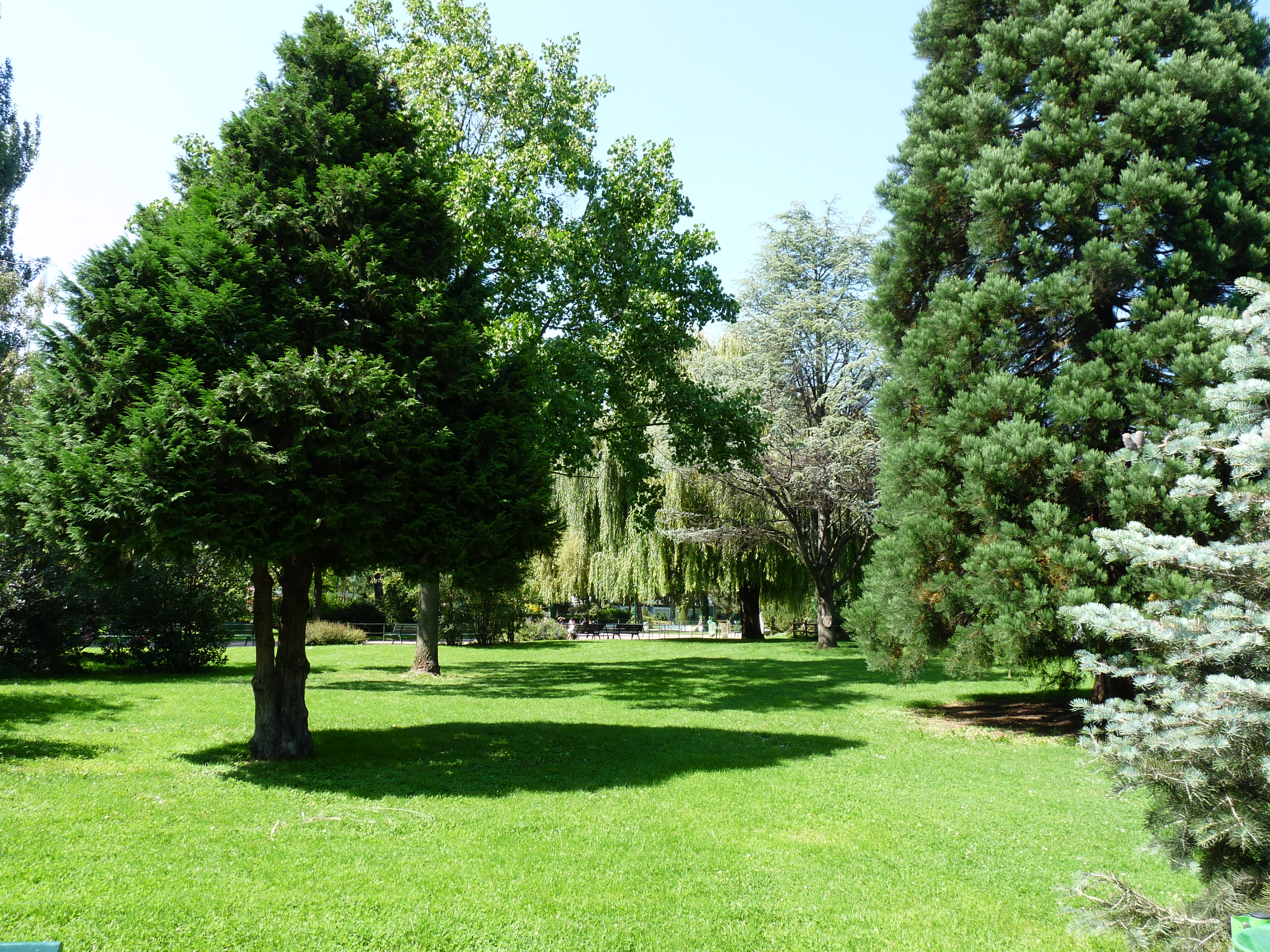
Square Emmanuel-Fleury, a picturesque landscape garden in the 20th arrondissement

Square Emmanuel Fleury (1973) in the 20th arrondissement, with an area of 2.34 hectares (5.8 acres), is larger than most of the postwar gardens, and, while it has sports fields, including a course for roller sports, it is more in the picturesque Napeoleon III style than the other postwar gardens, with rich flower beds, winding paths, groves of trees and kiosks.

Square Sainte-Odile (1976), in the 17th arrondissement, by landscape architect Jean Camand, was one of the first of a new model of gardens which appeared in the 1980s and 1990s; occupying a small space (1.13 hectare), it was divided into different spaces, each with a different style and theme, often radically different; next to a church, it includes a landscape garden in one section; a playground in another, a picturesque butte with a pavilion; a central basin with an abstract sculpture; and a monument to the harpist Lily Laskine.

=== Parc floral de Paris (1969) ===
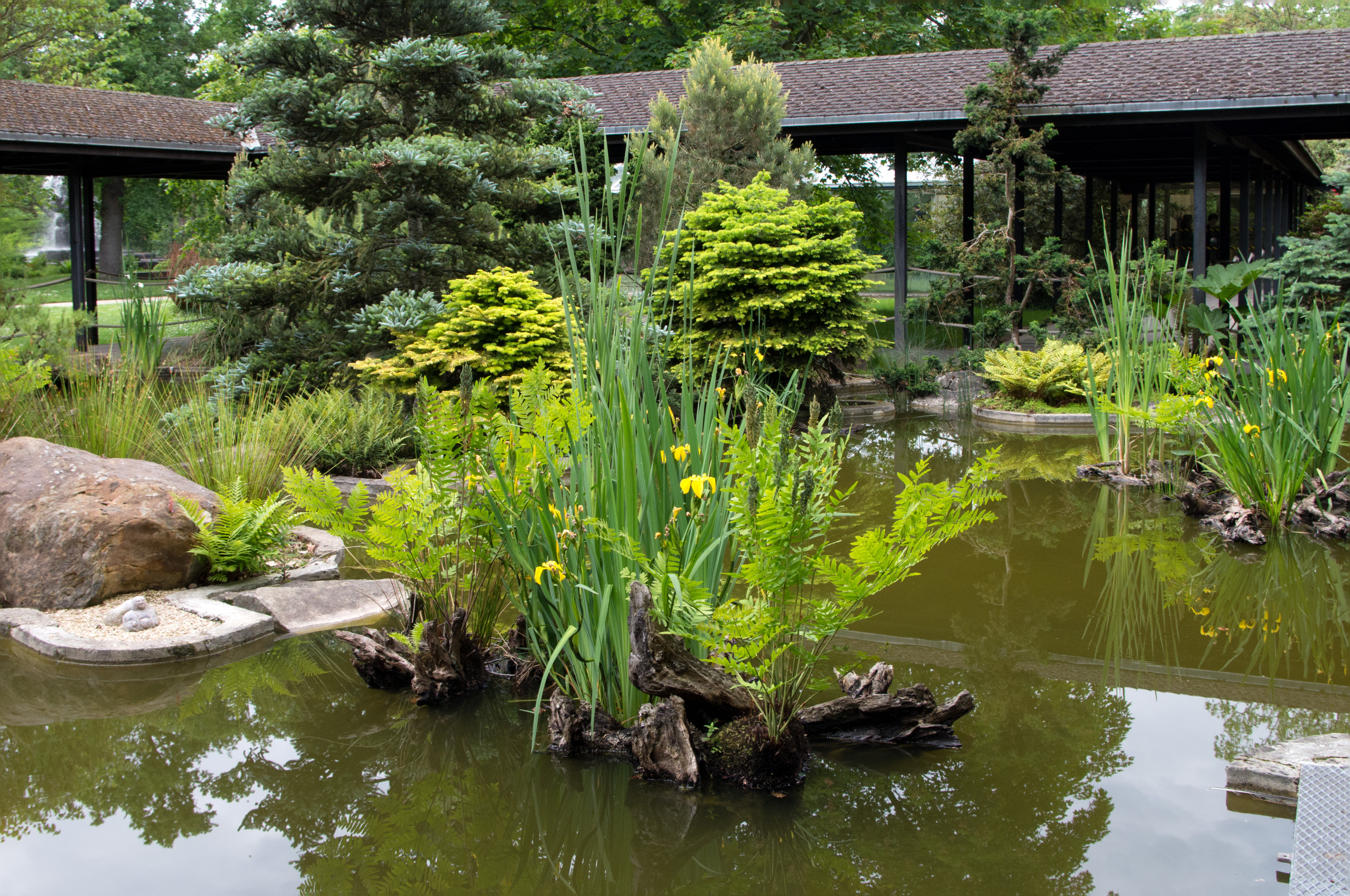
The garden of the Japanese pavilion in the Parc Floral de Paris

The largest new garden created in Paris in the second part of the 20th century was the Parc floral de Paris, covering 31 hectares (77 acres), which was built within the Bois de Vincennes in 1969. In 1959 and 1964 that park had been the site of a large international flower show, the Floralies internationales, and the two events had been so popular that the city decided to make a permanent site for flower exhibitions. Land was ceded to the city from military installations within the park, and the new gardens were created under the direction of landscape architect Daniel Collin. The new park was an ensemble of different flower gardens with different themes; a valley of flowers; a garden of contemporary sculptures; a water garden; and a children's garden, as well as pavilions for indoor displays and exhibits of exotic flowers, Japanese bonsai and other botanical attractions. A Garden of the Four Seasons was added in 1979, with flowers in bloom from early spring until the end of autumn. The park also featured an outdoor theater for musical events, and small lakes and fountains.

=== Jardin Tino-Rossi (1975–1980) ===
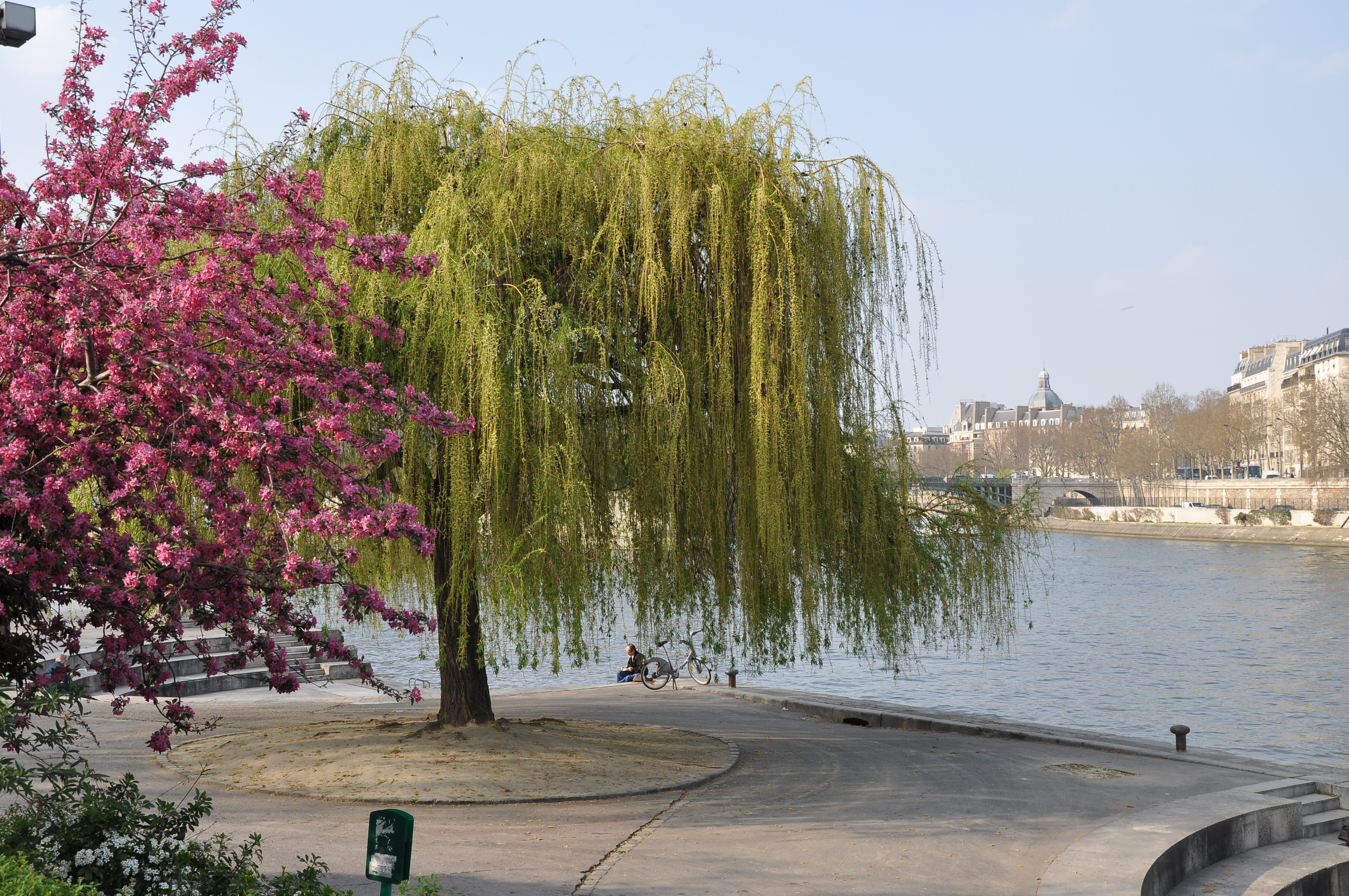
The Jardin Tino-Rossi combines a promenade along the Seine and an open-air museum of late 20th-century sculpture.

In the 19th century, the site of the Jardin Tino-Rossi, on the quai Saint-Bernard in the 5th arrondissement, had been the place where wine barrels were unloaded from barges for sale at the nearby Halle aux vins. In 1975, government of President Valéry Giscard d'Estaing decided to make the quai into a promenade, featuring rows of plantane trees planted along the quai in the 19th century, and a series of small garden amphitheaters by the edge of the water. In 1980, a more ambitious element was added; an outdoor sculpture garden featuring over fifty works by late 20th-century sculptors, including Alexander Calder, Constantin Brâncuși, and Jean Arp. While the promenade is generally considered a success, the works of sculpture have suffered over time from degradation and vandalism.

== Parks of the Mitterrand era (1981–1995) ==
During the fourteen-year presidency of François Mitterrand, coinciding with the bicentennial of the French Revolution, Paris saw an explosion of major public works projects, including the Opéra Bastille, the Louvre pyramid and underground courtyard, and the new national library. The Mitterrand projects included opening one hundred and fifty new parks, squares and gardens, a larger number than those constructed under Napoleon III, though the total area of the new parks was much smaller. Unlike the Second Empire, when all the new gardens followed the same basic plan and picturesque style, the Mitterrand-era gardens were built by different architects and landscape architects, and offered a wide variety of styles and designs, from miniature recreations of natural wilderness to high-tech. Many of the new parks and gardens, such as La Villette, were built on former industrial sites, and a majority were built in the outer neighborhoods of the city, where the population was most dense. Most all of the new parks featured works of contemporary art and sculpture.

The landscape architect Bernard Tschumi, who designed the gardens of the Parc de la Villette, tried to explain the philosophy of the new parks in a book entitled The Parks of the 21st Century (1987): "The conditions of the modern city have made invalid the historic prototype of a park as an image of nature. The park can no longer be conceived as a model of a utopian world in miniature, protected from vulgar reality. Rather than a place of escape, the contemporary park should be seen as an environment defined by the preoccupations of the inhabitants of the city, of their recreation needs and the pleasures defined by the working conditions and cultural aspirations of contemporary urban society."

=== Parc Georges-Brassens (1984) ===
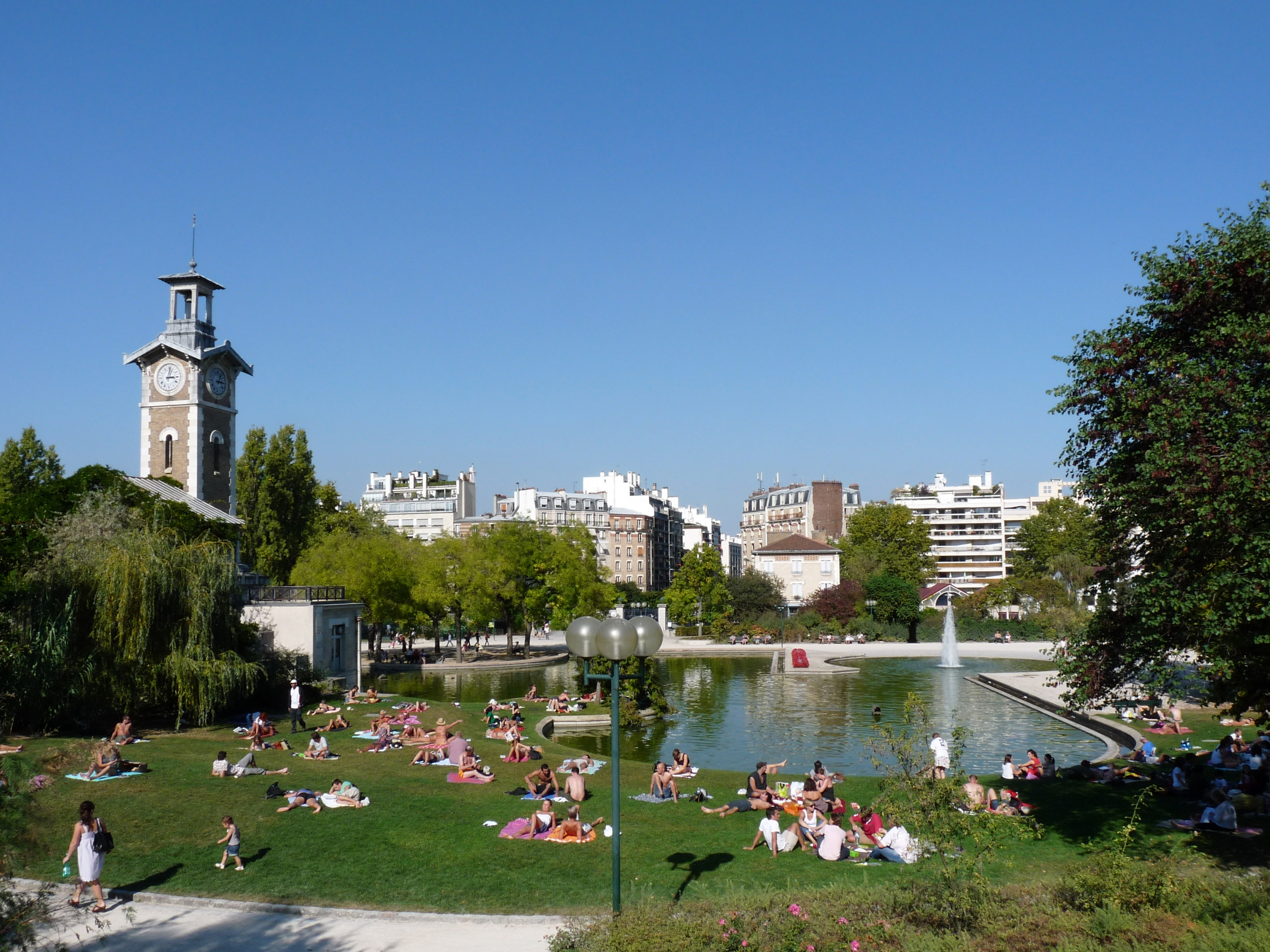
The centerpiece of Parc Georges-Brassens is the belfry of the old auction market of the abattoirs of Vaugirard.

Parc Georges-Brassens (15th arrondissement), occupying 7.4 hectares (18 acres), is located on the site of the former Vaugirard slaughterhouse and horse market from 1894 to 1897, which were demolished between 1969 and 1979. The design, by architects Ghiulamila and Milliex and landscape architect Daniel Collin, preserved picturesque elements of the original market, including the belfry of the old auction market of the abattoirs of Vaugirard, and the covered horse market, which now serves on weekends as the site of an antiquarian book market. Modern sculptures of horses stand at the entrance to the garden. Corners of the park are occupied by a pre-school and day care center, and a theater. The landscape garden in the center of the park, in the picturesque tradition of Alphand and the Second Empire, has a lake, winding paths, flowerbeds, a rose garden and a garden of aromatic plants. The slope of the park also has a dry cascade of artificial stones, for children to climb.

=== Parc de Belleville (1988) ===
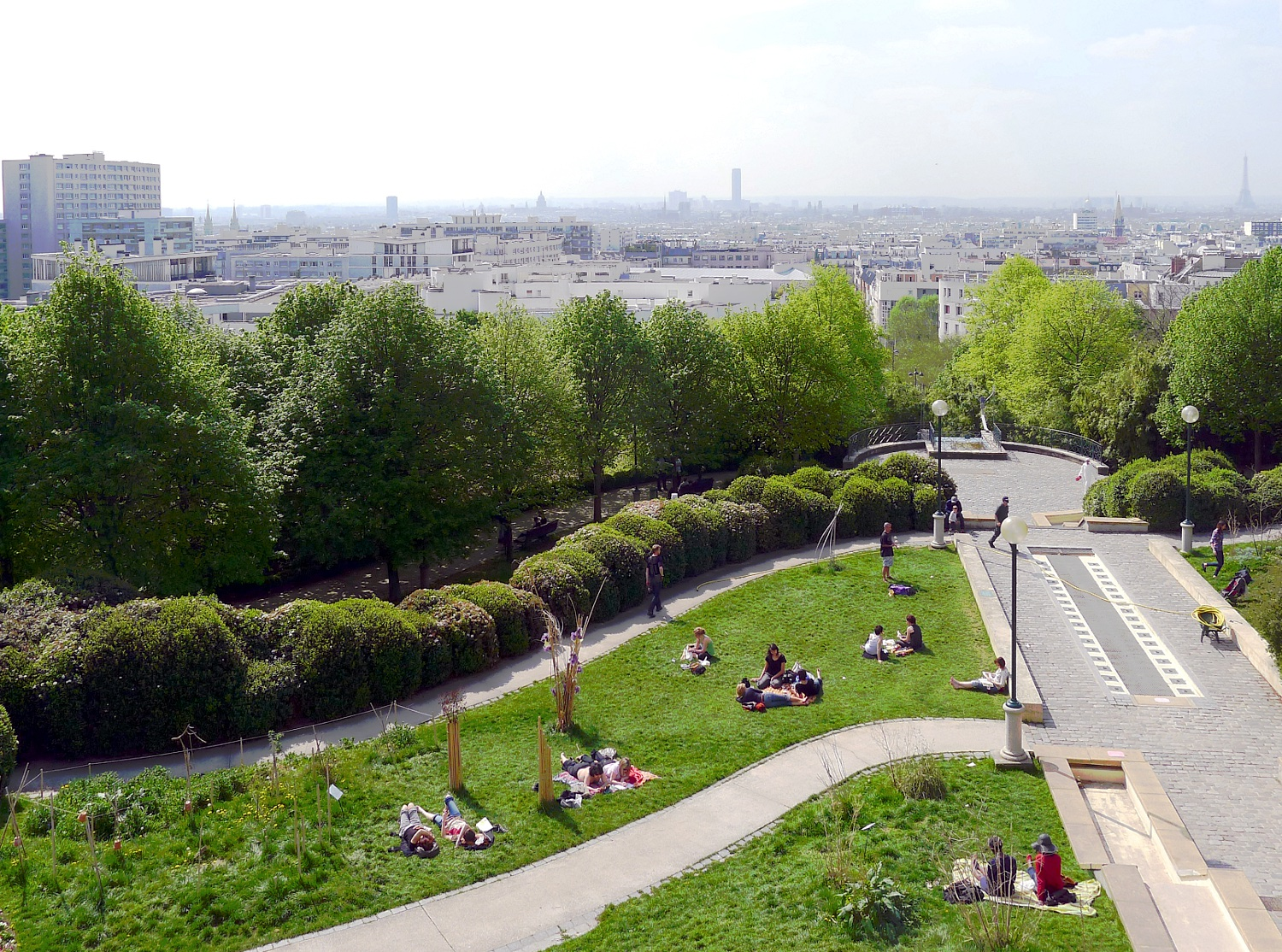
The Parc de Belleville, in the 20th arrondissement, has a panoramic from the highest park in Paris, and encourages visitors to sit on the grass.

The Parc de Belleville, in the 20th arrondissement, was another early Mitterrand-era park. It was designed by architect Francois Debulois and landscape architect Paul Brichet, and built on a steeply-sloping site that covered 4.5 hectares (11 acres), on the hill of Belleville, the highest point in the city. The park was located not far from the Parc des Buttes Chaumont, and shared some of the same picturesque elements as that Second-Empire park, including a terrace and belvedere at the top of the park with a panoramic view of the city, winding paths along the hillsides, abundant flowerbeds and groves of trees, and a series of cascades from the top of the hill down to a semi-circular basin, then under Rue Julian Lacroix to a circular basin in another garden in the jardin de Pali-Kao, a miniature park of three thousand square meters opened in 1989. Visitors to the park are invited to sit on the abundant lawns of the park, a practice long discouraged in Paris parks. Like Buttes-Chaumont, the Parc de Belleville originally had a grotto, built into the side of the old stone quarries, but it had to be closed because of vandalism and security concerns.

=== Parc de la Villette (1987–1991) ===
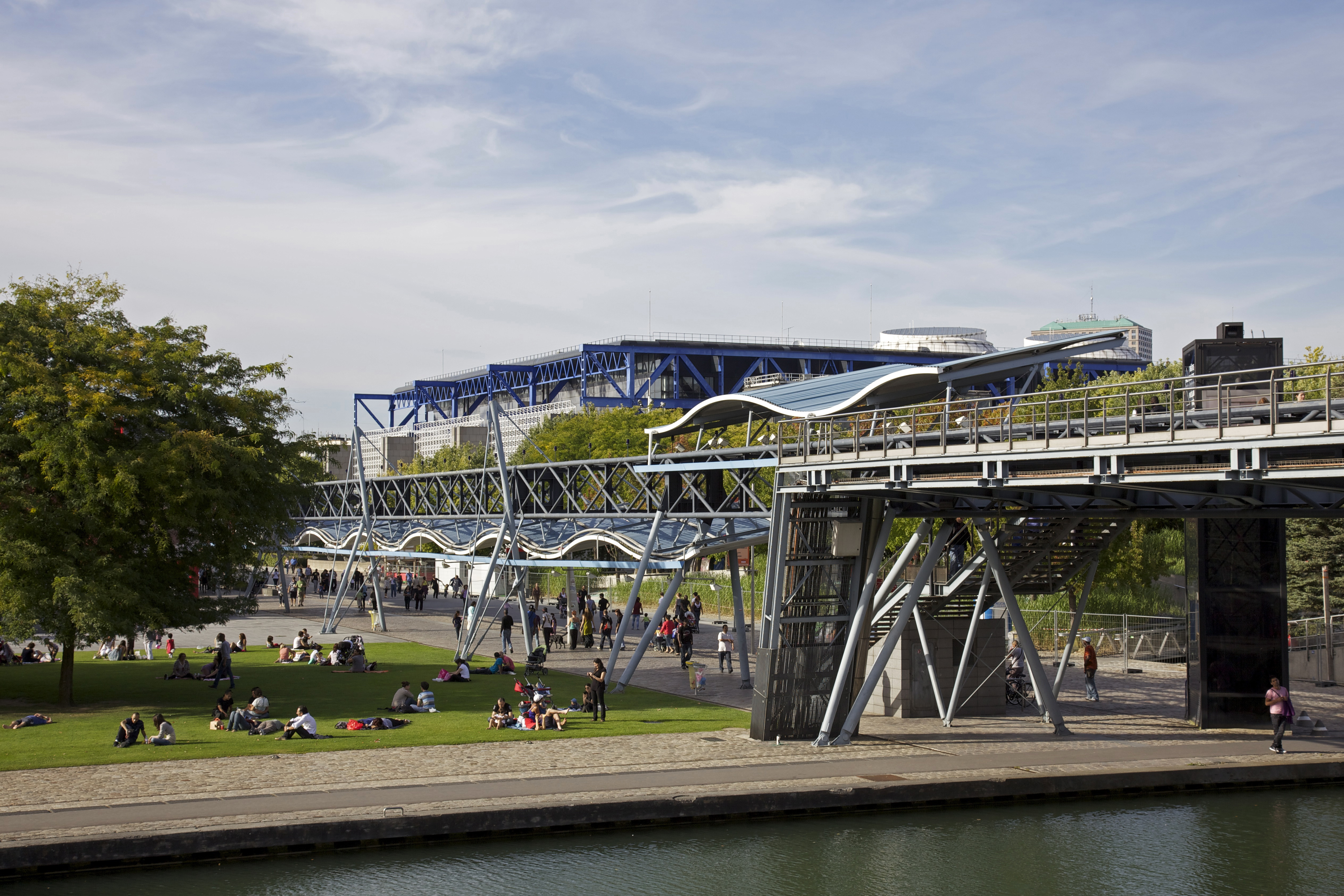
Parc de la Villette, like a high-tech amusement park, has ten different thematic gardens and playgrounds.

The Parc de la Villette was formerly the main slaughterhouse of the city, located in the 19th arrondissement at the intersection of the Canal de l'Ourq and the Canal Saint-Denis. One structure remains from the old site, the Grande Halle, built in 1867 by Jules de Merindol, a student of Baltard, who had built the famous glass and iron structures of Les Halles. In 1982, and international competition selected landscape architect Bernard Tschumi to design the park. The final design was composed of ten thematic gardens, which Tschumi described as a "cinematic promenade" of different sights and styles.

The Parc de la Villette is more in the category of a high-tech amusement park, like Disneyland or Tivoli Gardens, than a traditional park. Twenty hectares of the fifty-five hectare site are devoted to buildings and structures, including the Cite des Sciences et de l'industrie, the Cite de la Musique, the Zenith performance hall, a full-sized submarine, and the central landmark, the mirror-surfaced Geode, a geodesic dome. The ten thematic gardens include playgrounds and small peaceful sanctuaries; they include a garden of mirrors, a garden of shadows, a garden of islands, a garden of bamboos, a garden of dunes, and several thematic playgrounds, including one with a slide in the form of a dragon. The gardens also feature works of sculpture by noted artists and sculptors, including Claes Oldenburg and Daniel Buren.

=== Parc André Citroën (1992) ===
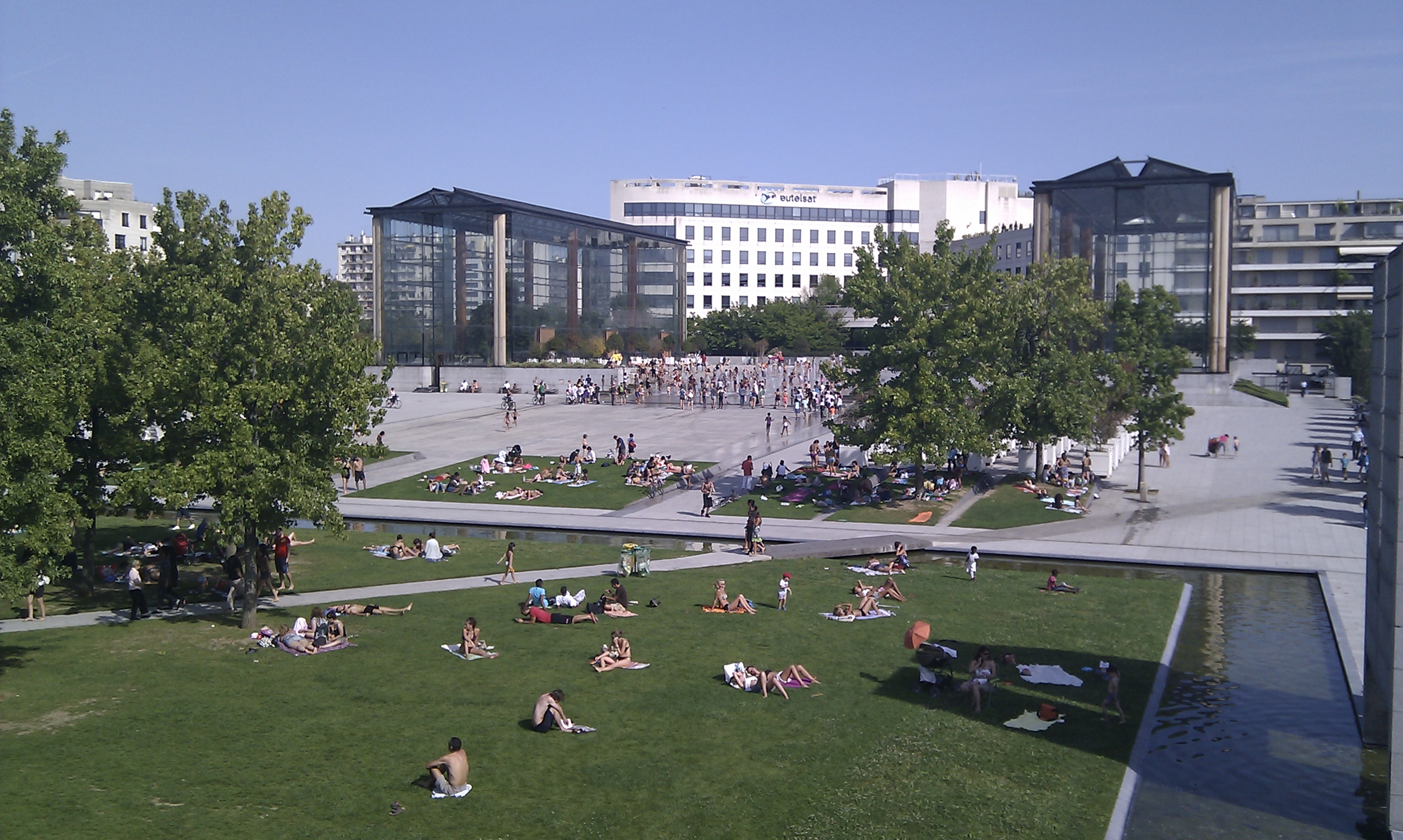
Parc André Citroën (1992), on the site of an old automobile factory, offers high-tech greenhouses, broad lawns and a variety of small thematic gardens.

Parc André Citroën, located on the Seine in the 15th arrondissement, was the site of the Citroën automobile factory from 1915 until the 1970s. The plan for the new park was developed by landscape architects Gilles Clément and Alain Provost, along with architects Patrick Berger, Jean-François Jodry, and Jean-Pierre Viguier. Like most of the Mitterrand-era parks, it combined two very different styles of parks, a recreation park and a picturesque floral park; the centerpiece of the 24-hectare (59-acre) park is a large lawn, 273 by 85 meters, dedicated to recreation, sports and relaxation. The natural and pure garden aspect of the park is expressed by two very large greenhouses in the southeast overlooking the park, one an orangerie and the other displaying plants of the Mediterranean. There are also series of six small "serial gardens," each associated with a different metal, planet, state of water, and a sense; and the "Garden of movement", a meadow of different grasses blown by the wind. A canal frames one side of the large lawn, while the serial gardens, each in its own alcove, enclose the other side.

=== Promenade plantée (1993) ===
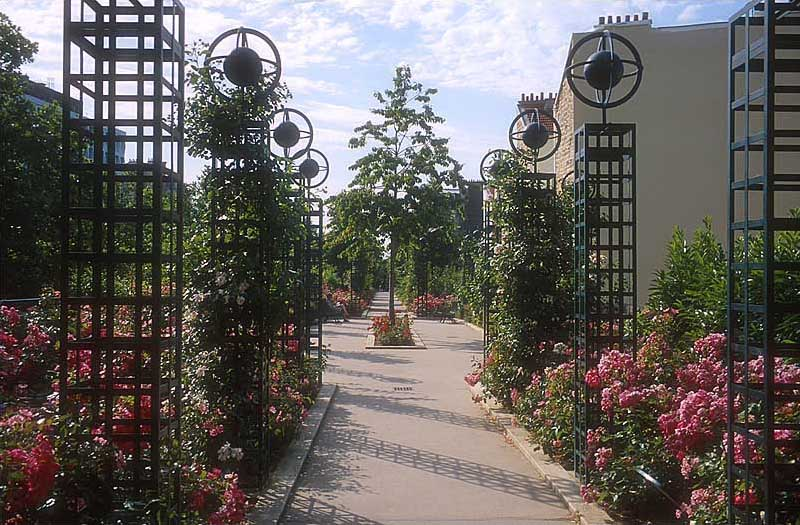
The Promenade plantée, built on an abandoned railway viaduct ten meters above the city, stretches 4.7 kilometers from Place de la Bastille to the edge of the city.

The Promenade plantée, in the 12th arrondissement, is the most original of Paris parks. The creation of landscape architect Jacques Vergely and architect Philippe Mathieux, it was built ten meters above the street on the abandoned viaduct of the Vincennes railway, which had been built under Napoleon III in 1859. The park extends 4.7 kilometers, from the site of the former Bastille station of the railroad line, close to Place de la Bastille, to Verneuil-l'Étang, at the peripheric highway at the outer edge of the city. The park offers a variety of different landscapes, from bamboo forest to picturesque flower garden, as well as fine views of the city. It is accessed by a number of stairways along its route, and is sometimes enclosed. Preference is given to people strolling, though joggers are allowed, if they do not impede the promenaders. Because of the narrow width of the promenade, bicycles are not permitted.

The Promenade plantée has inspired similar parks in other cities; the High Line in the Chelsea neighborhood of New York City, opened in 2009, and the three-mile Bloomingdale Trail in Chicago.

=== Jardin Atlantique (1994) ===
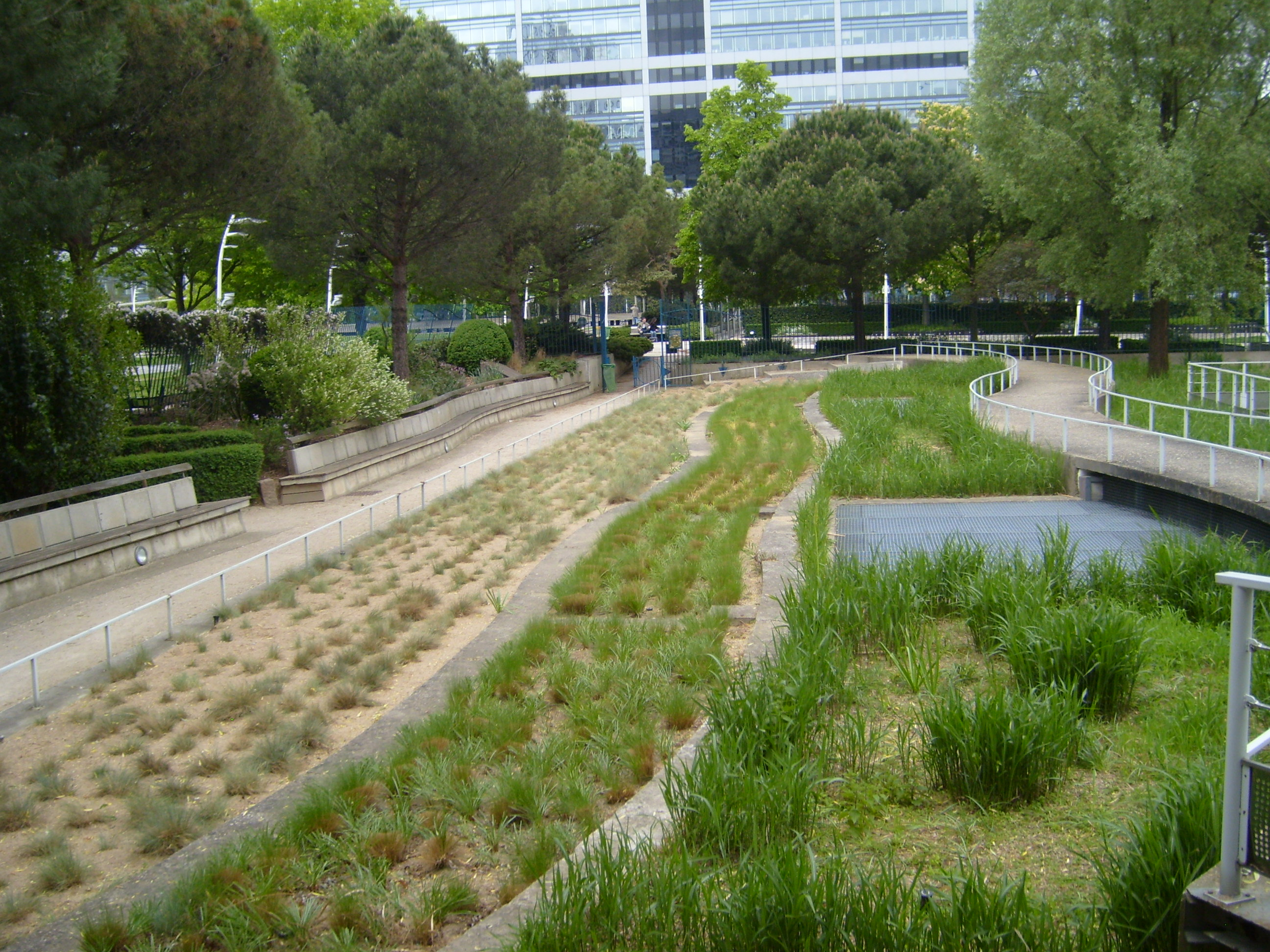
The "Room of undulating grasses" in the Jardin Atlantique, on the roof of the Gare Montparnasse railway station

The Jardin Atlantique in the 15th arrondissement, like the Promenade plantée, has a highly unusual site, perched on twelve concrete pillars seventeen meters above street level, atop the roof over the Gare Montparnasse railway station, which connects Paris with the west of France. It was designed by landscape architects Michael Pena and François Brun, and was reportedly the most expensive park built in Paris. Like the other Mitterrand-era parks, it has a central lawn, surrounded by thematic gardens and sprinkled with modern sculpture and fountains. It also has thirty openings, which provide ventilation and light for the train tracks and platforms below, and the announcements of train arrivals and departures can be heard in the park above. The design of park has a vague resemblance to the deck of an ocean liner, in keeping with the connection of the train station to the Atlantic seaports of Cherbourg and Le Havre.

Because of the weight limitations and limited depth of soil, it has a high proportion of concrete and other structural materials compared to the amount of greenery. Nonetheless, the park has five hundred trees, planted in cubic stone boxes. The thematic gardens include a garden of varied moving in the wind; a garden of aquatic plants; a garden of coastal plants, a garden of blue and mauve colored flowers; and the "hall of silence", a meditation garden.

=== Parc de Bercy (1994–1997) ===
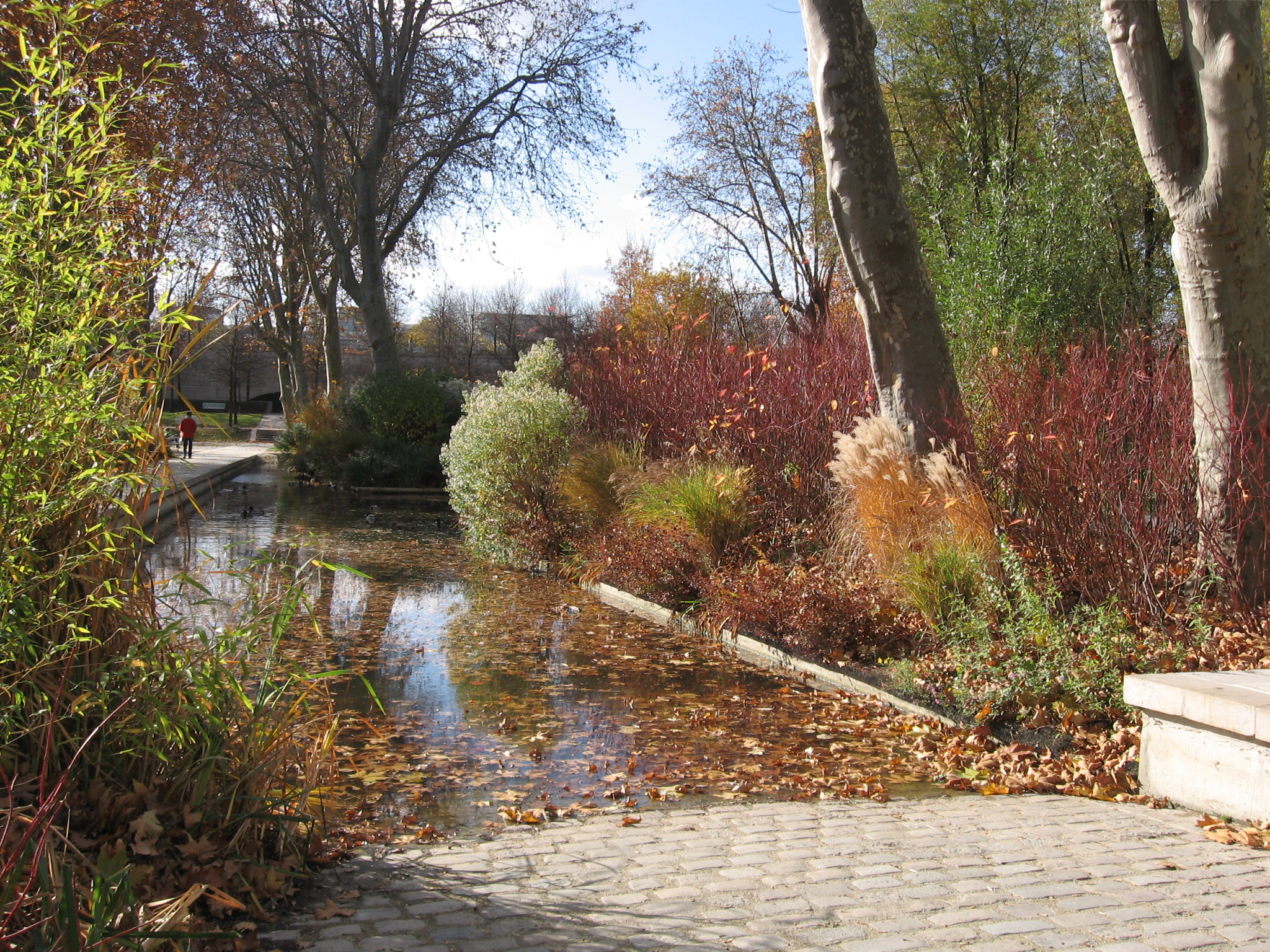
The Jardin romantique of Parc de Bercy in the autumn

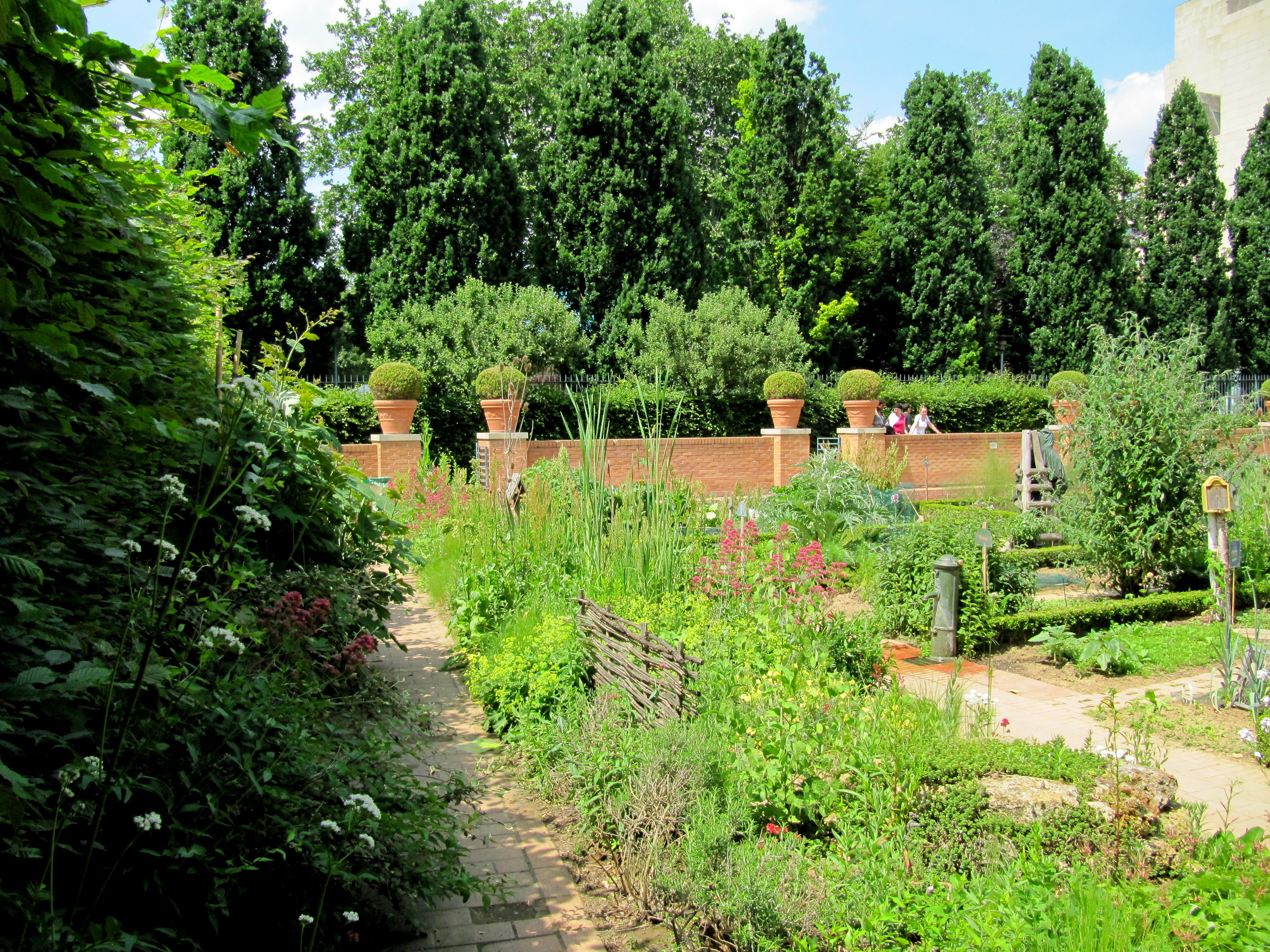
Parterres in the Parc de Bercy

The site of the Parc de Bercy, alongside the Seine in the 12th arrondissement, was at the edge of the city limits until the time of Napoleon III. It was the site of the wine depot where barrels wine and spirits were unloaded from barges and taxed before they were delivered to the city. Under the Mitterrand program, the new park was intended as the east-Paris equivalent of the Tuileries Garden, alongside the Seine in the center of the city. The site already had a wide avenues lined by two hundred century-old chestnut and plantain trees, which, along with several old buildings from the wine depot, were integrated into the new park. Though the park was far from the center of the city, it was next to the new Palais Omnisports indoor sports facility and the Cinematheque (originally the American Center, designed by Frank Gehry) and linked by a new bridge to the new National Library across the Seine. On the river side, the park was bordered by a high terrace, which blocked the noise of the highway along the river and gave view over both the Seine and the park. The park also has an amphitheater, on the site where a neolithic village was discovered.

The landscaping of the new park was designed by architects Bernard Huet, Madeleine Ferrand, Jean-Pierre Feuges and landscape architects Ian la Caisne and Philippe Raguin. Their design created three separate gardens with different themes, connected by footbridges over the streets that divide them. The western park, near at the Palais Omnisports, called Les Prairies, features broad lawns under trees; this part of the park is also used for informal sports, soccer skateboarding and rollerblading. The center park is called Les Parterres, and is devoted to serious gardening. It includes an aromatic garden, a rose garden, and a vegetable garden where school groups come to learn about agriculture and gardening. The garden on the east is called Le Jardin romantique, and it has a water theme; it includes a canal, fishponds, cascades, and a pool with water lilies.

== Paris parks and gardens of the 21st century ==
Following the late 20th century tradition of French Presidents constructing new museums and parks to mark their period in office, President Jacques Chirac launched the Musée du quai Branly, devoted to the arts of the Americas, Africa, Asia and Oceania.

In 1991, the banks of the Seine were declared a UNESCO cultural heritage site, and efforts began to make the highways and industrial space that remained along the river into a long promenade. Beginning in 2000, sections of the highways were closed on Sundays for promenades and jogging, and an artificial "beach" with sand and deck chairs was installed in summer. In 2008, during the administration of Mayor Bertrand Delanoë (2001–2014), the city of Paris began to transform portions of the highways built along the left and right banks of the Seine into parks and recreation areas. In 2013, a 2.3 kilometer section of the left-bank highway between the Pont d'Alma and the Musée d'Orsay opened as a permanent promenade, the Promenade des Berges de la Seine.

=== Gardens of the Musée du quai Branly (2006) ===
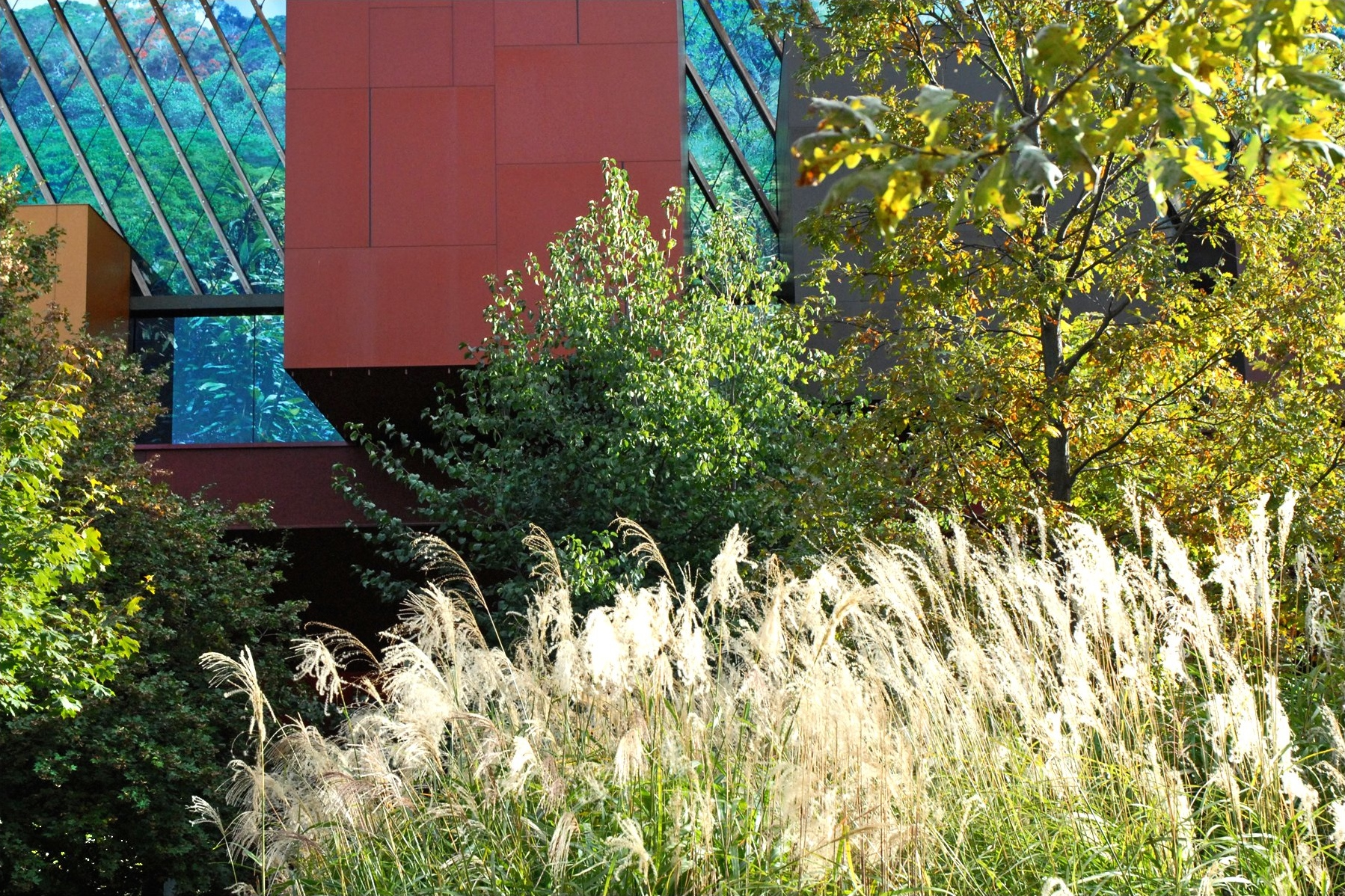
The gardens of the Musée du quai Branly (2006) are designed to be the exact opposite of a French formal garden; a celebration of nature.

The site of the Musée du quai Branly, on the left bank of the Seine, facing the Palais de Chaillot, and just a hundred meters from the EIffel Tower, had been occupied by the buildings of the Ministry of Reconstruction and Urbanism. An international competition led to selection of architect Jean Nouvel to design the new museum. The original proposal for the museum had called for a garden occupying 7,500 square meters of the 25,000-square-meter (270,000 sq ft) site. Nouvel increased the gardens to 17,500 square meters, and made a series of different gardens an integral part of the museum. The largest section, the "garden of movement", between the rue de l'Université and the quai Branly, is a composition of small gardens created by landscape architect Gilles Clément, designed to appear wild and to be the opposite of a French classical garden. The other notable feature of the garden is the Mur vegetale or "wall of vegetation", designed by Patrick Blanc; a composition of 15,000 plants of 150 different species which cover 800 square meters of the exterior facades of the museum and 150 square meters of the interior walls. The "wall" is renewed and trimmed each year.

=== Promenade des Berges de la Seine (2013) ===
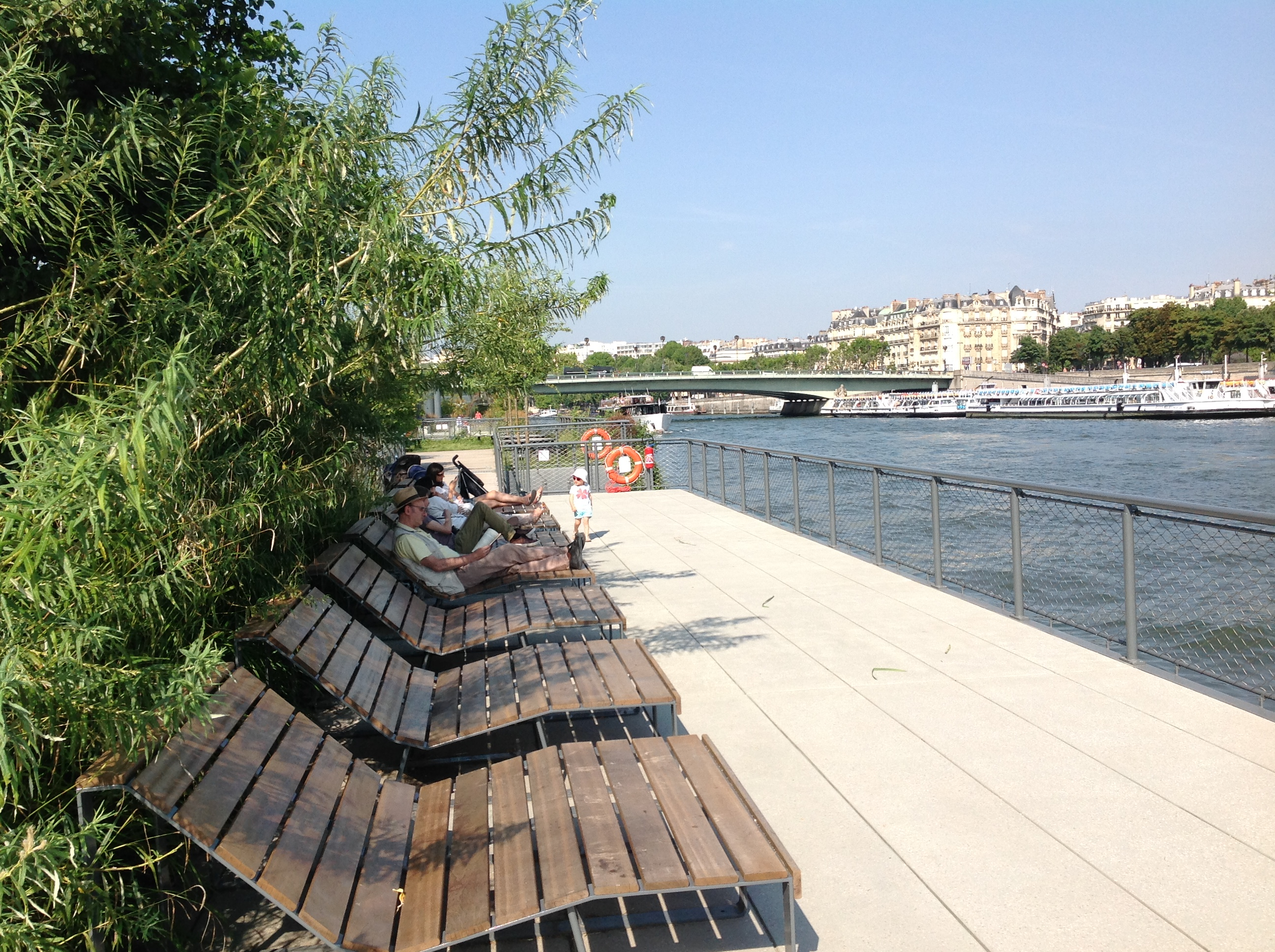
One of the floating gardens along the Promenade des Berges de la Seine in the 7th arrondissement

In the 19th century and early 20th century, the paved quay of the Left Bank of the Seine between the Pont de l'Alma and the Musée d'Orsay had been used for several international expositions, for boat docks and storage depots, and for cafes and floating swimming pool. Between 1961 and 1967, highways were built along both banks of the river to relieve traffic congestion in the center of the city. In 1991, the banks of the river were classified as UNESCO cultural heritage site, and efforts began to turn the highways into parks and promenades. Beginning in 2008, a 2.3 kilometer section of the highway was permanently closed and made into the Promenade des Berges de la Seine, which was dedicated on June 19, 2013. The promenade includes five floating "islands", a total of 1800 square meters in size, placed atop barges, with trees, bushes, flowers and deck chairs. The former highway is lined with spaces for concerts and classes; outdoor exhibit space; playgrounds; a climbing wall; a discothèque under a bridge; and tipis and furnished containers which can be hired for lunches, celebrations or meetings. There are boat docks and several outdoor cafes along the promenade. All the facilities of the park are portable, and can be removed within 24 hours if the waters of the Seine rise too high. The promenade was designed by architect Franklin Azzi, and the islands were created by Jean-Christophe Chobet.

== See also ==
- List of parks and gardens in Paris
- French Renaissance garden
- French formal garden
- French landscape garden
- Haussmann's renovation of Paris
- Paris during the Second Empire
- Paris in the Belle Époque
