= Paris Cité University =

French public university established in 2019

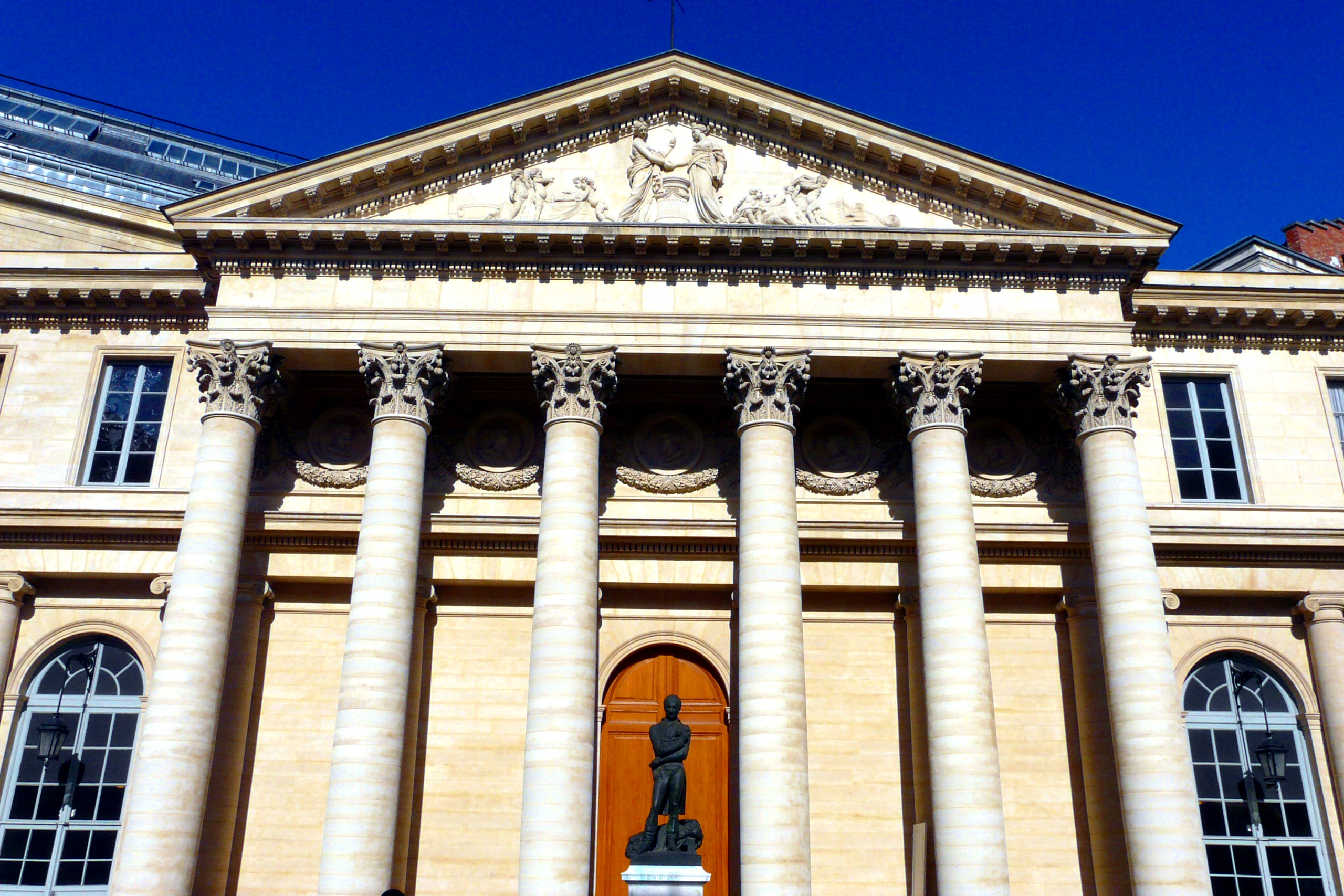
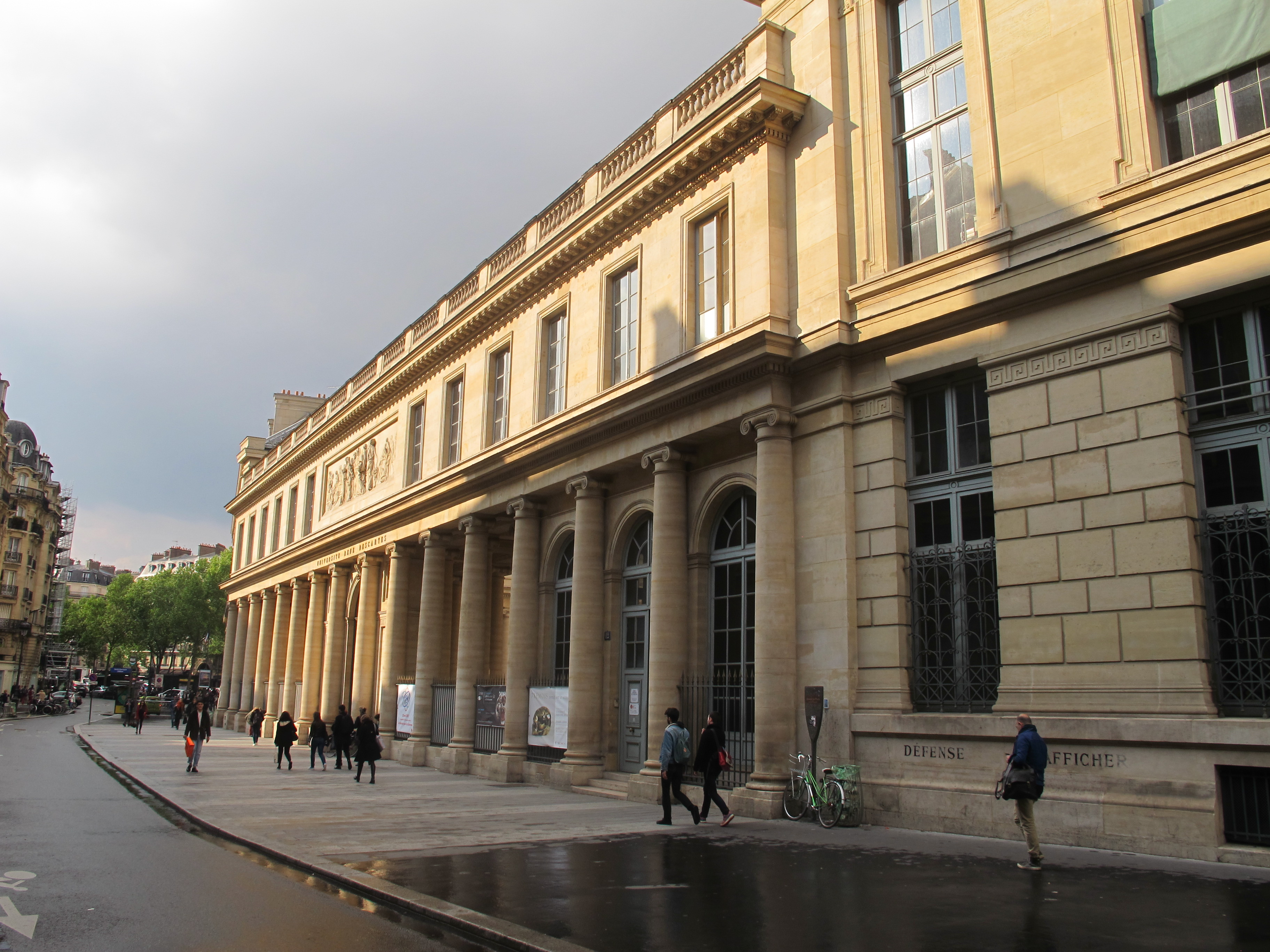
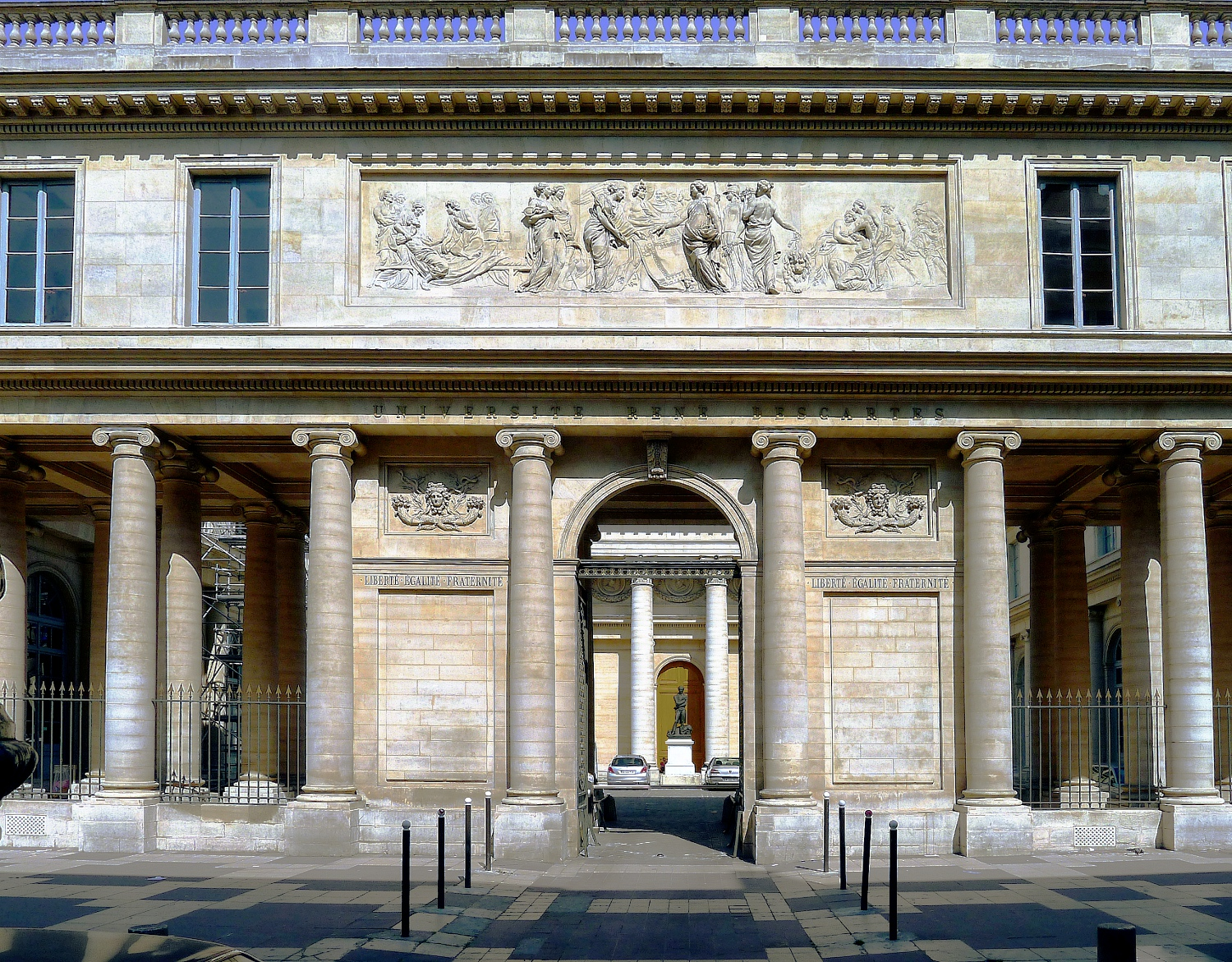
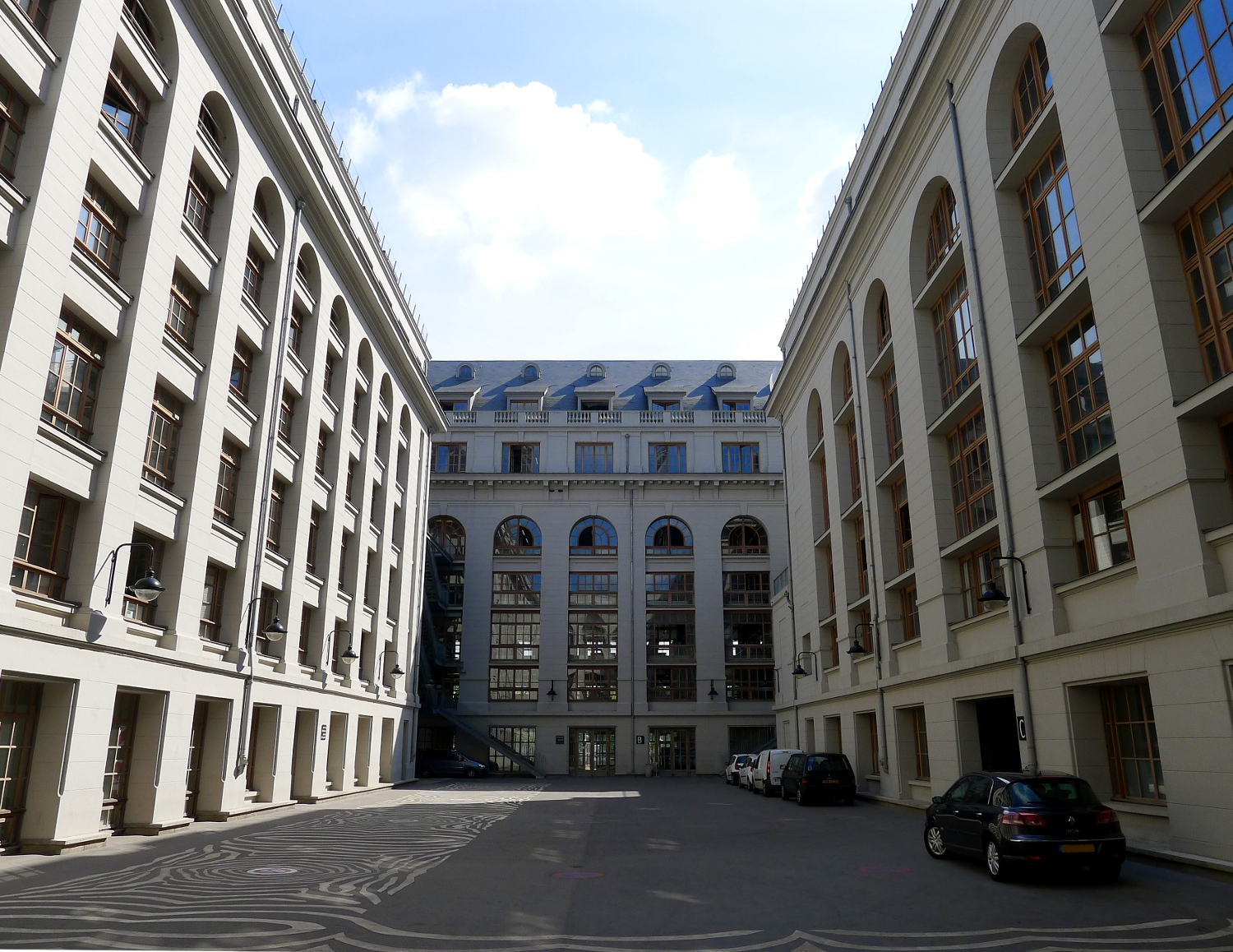
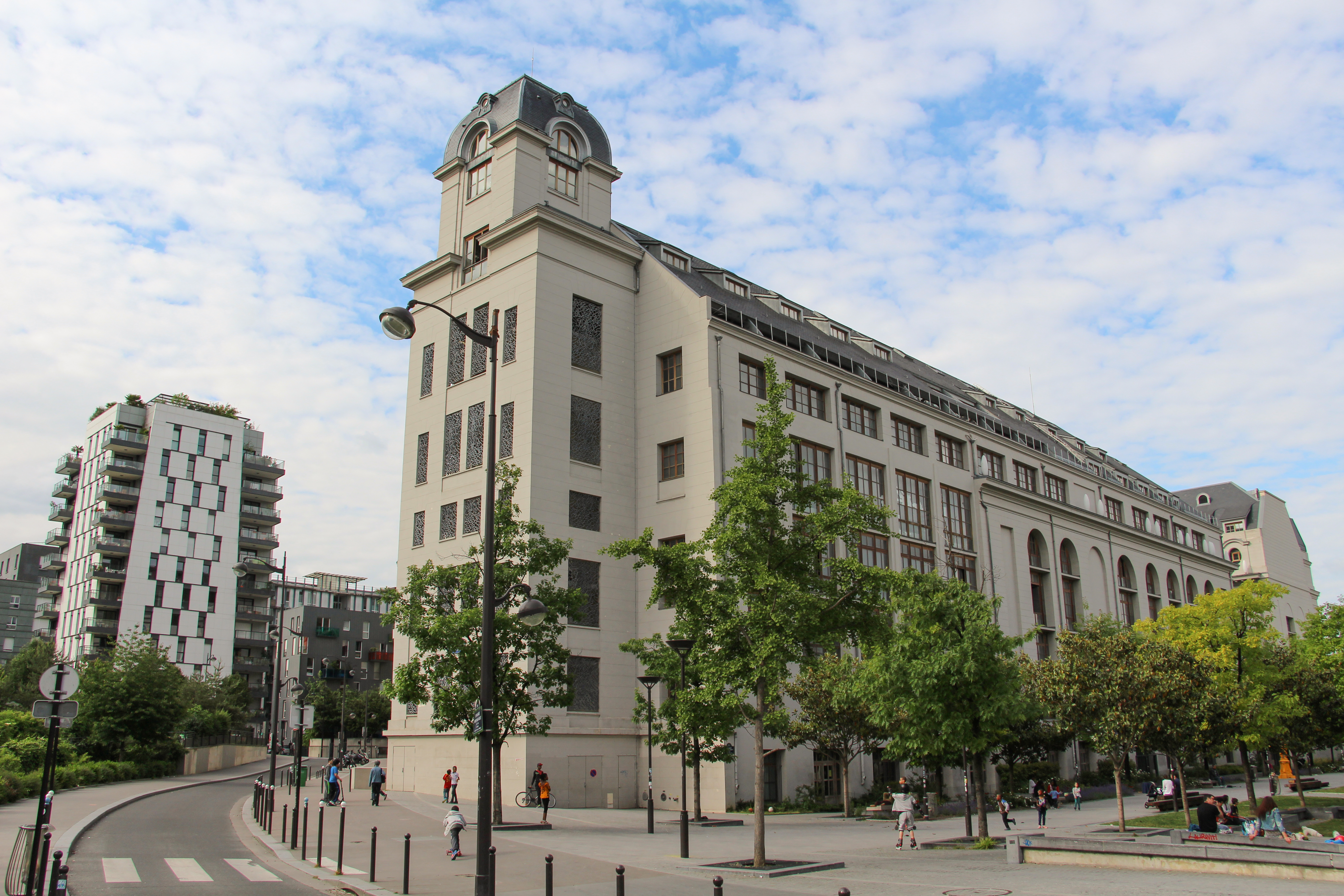
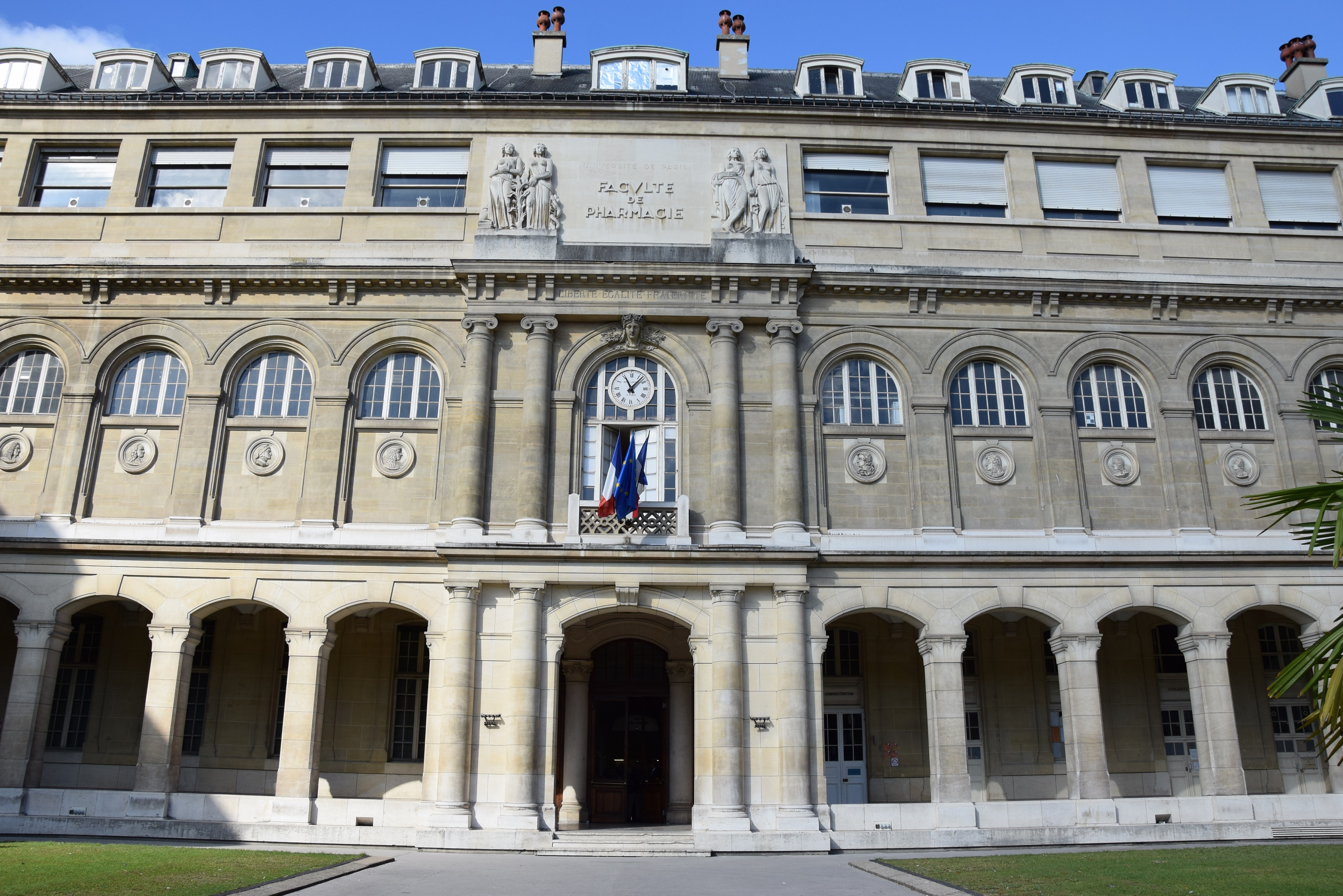
- Latin: Universitas Parisiensis
- Type: Public
- Established: 19 March 2019; 1970 – Paris V & Paris VII c. 1200 – University of Paris Faculty of Medicine
- Affiliations: Sorbonne Paris Cité Alliance; Udice Group
- President: Pr. Christine Clerici
- Academic staff: 4,500
- Administrative staff: 3,000
- Students: 64,100
- Location: Paris, France
- Campus: Urban (with the Latin Quarter and The Great Mills campuses)
- Colours: Bordeaux and grey
- Sporting affiliations: Paris Region University Sports League (LIFSU), Paris Cité University Sports Association
- Website: u-paris.fr

Paris Cité University (French: Université Paris Cité) is a public research university located in Paris, France. It was created by decree on 20 March 2019, resulting from the merger of Paris Descartes (Paris V) and Paris Diderot (Paris VII) universities, established following the division of the University of Paris in 1970. It was originally established as the University of Paris (French: Université de Paris), but was renamed by decree in March 2022 to its current name.

The university headquarters is located in the École de Médecine building, in the 6th arrondissement at boulevard Saint-Germain. It has 15 teaching hospitals and 28,800 medical students. It is the main successor to the University of Paris Faculty of Medicine, founded around 1200, along with Sorbonne University.

== History ==
=== 1970: Division of the University of Paris ===
Following the disruption, de Gaulle appointed Edgar Faure as minister of education; Faure was assigned to draft reforms about the French university system, with the help of academics. Their proposal was adopted on 12 November 1968; in accordance with the new law, the faculties of the University of Paris were to reorganize themselves.

Some of the new universities took over the old faculties and the majority of their professors: social sciences by Paris-I Panthéon-Sorbonne University; law by Paris-II Panthéon-Assas University; humanities by Paris-III Sorbonne Nouvelle and Paris-IV Sorbonne University; science by Paris-V Descartes University, Paris-VI Pierre and Marie Curie University, Paris-VII Paris Diderot University, and Paris-XI Orsay University.

The thirteen successor universities to the University of Paris are now split over the three academies of the Île-de-France region.

=== 2000: University of Paris reunification projects ===
The Universities of Paris III, Paris V, and Paris VII have been moving closer together since the mid-2000s as part of the establishment of research and higher education clusters (PRES) and the Campus Plan. An initial understanding bringing them together took place in January 2006 with the creation of the association Paris Centre Universities, which then brought together the university with those of Paris 1, Paris 5, and Paris 13, whereas the other Parisian universities had united around the Paris Universitas project the previous year. The projects put forward by these initial meetings of institutions were not retained in the first phase of the campus plan of April 2008, and new links are being formed.

University of Paris VII subsequently became part of the Sorbonne Paris Cité project, which also brings together the universities of Paris III, Paris V and Paris 13, as well as other higher education institutions such as Sciences Po, and the PRES was officially created on 13 February 2010.

=== 2019: Merger of the Universities of Paris V and Paris VII ===
In 2017, Paris III Sorbonne-Nouvelle University and Sciences Po withdrew from the merger project but the universities of Paris V and Paris VII decided on a merger scheduled for 1 January 2019. The University of Paris was created as a university grouping on 20 March 2019.

The Universities of Paris V and Paris VII were dissolved on 1 January 2020 while the Institut de Physique du Globe de Paris, as a "component-institution", retains its legal personality.

On 21 June 2019, Christine Clerici was elected president of University of Paris. On proposals, she appointed the following faculty councils: Alain Zider, dean of the Faculty of Science, Xavier Jeunemaitre, dean of the Faculty of Health, and Sylvain Moutier, dean of the Faculty of Humanities and Social Sciences.

The Academic Senate of University of Paris, meeting on 8 October 2019, elected Edouard Kaminski, vice-president for research, Philippe Roussel-Galle, vice-president for training.

After an appeal by the Paris 2 Panthéon-Assas University, the Conseil d'État annulled the part of the decree that established "University of Paris" as the name of the merged university on 29 December 2021. The university was renamed to "Université Paris Cité" by decree in March 2022.

== Organization and administration ==
Paris Cité University is a scientific, cultural and professional experimental public institution. It is multidisciplinary and comprises four main areas of training: legal, economic and management disciplines; humanities and social sciences; science and technology; and health disciplines.

=== Campus ===
Paris Cité University head office is located at 12 rue de l'École de Médecine, in the historic building of the École de Médecine (also called "Odéon centre") (6th arrondissement of Paris).

Paris Cité HQ or multidisciplinary (black), Faculty of Humanities and Social Sciences (purple), Faculty of Sciences (cyan) and Faculty of Health (red) campuses within Paris

The university has two main campuses:

- the Latin Quarter, with several centres in the heart of Paris, including the Odéon, Saint-Germain-des-Prés (Saints-Pères), Cordeliers Convent and Garancière centres in the 6th arrondissement;
- the Great Mills of Paris (Grands Moulins) campus in the 13th arrondissement with the École d'ingénieurs Denis-Diderot engineering department;

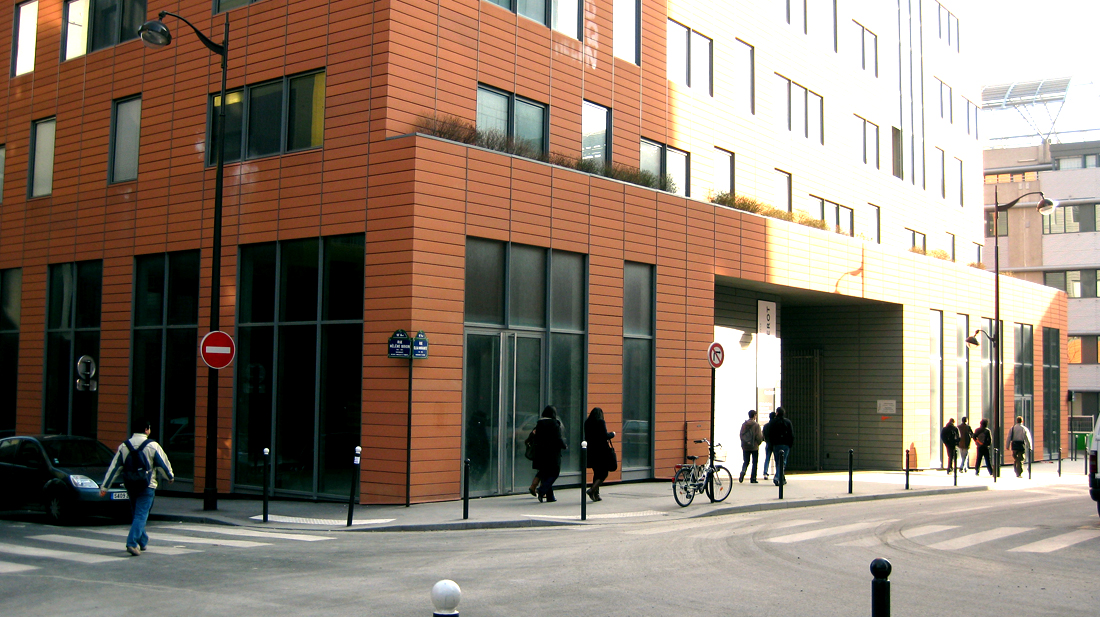
Condorcet building, headquarters of the Department of Physics in the Great Mills campus.

Paris Cité University has 21 facilities in Paris on both campuses. Its headquarters are centred on the École de Médecine building, which was built in place of the Collège de Bourgogne, in the Latin Quarter, on the rue de l'École-de-Médecine. The teaching facilities and the research laboratories are housed in the Cordeliers Convent centre and the Saints-Pères building (the former Nouvelle Faculté de Médecine), as far as the medical school and the social sciences school are concerned, and in the Bichat and Villemin university campuses. The Saints-Pères building also houses the joint department of Mathematics and Computer Science.

The odontology school is located in the Garancière centre. The headquarters of the Department of Physics is in the Condorcet building, in The Great Mills of Paris campus. This campus also contains Life Sciences, Mathematics, Geography, History and Social sciences and Letters, Art and Cinema departments.

The refurbished Henri-Piéron campus contains the school of psychology, whereas the law school is located in Malakoff. The dentistry school is located in Montrouge.

=== Admission ===
The undergraduate program of Paris Cité University is selective, with an acceptance rate of 11% (for Descartes campuses only). Admission to the second year of the university's master programs is selective as well, some of these programs admitting only 1.7% of applicants which can represent 25 students by programs.

=== International conventions ===
Paris Cité University has signed over 150 conventions with foreign universities across five continents, including Manchester, Warwick, Copenhagen, Rome, Madrid, Rotterdam, Helsinki, Stockholm or Ghent.

== Governance ==
On 21 June 2019, Christine Clerici was elected president of Paris Cité University. On proposals, she appointed the following faculty councils: Alain Zider, dean of the Faculty of Science, Xavier Jeunemaitre, dean of the Faculty of Health and Sylvain Moutier, dean of the Faculty of Societies and Humanities.

The Academic Senate of Université de Paris, meeting on 8 October 2019, elected Edouard Kaminski, vice-president for research, Philippe Roussel-Galle, vice-president for training and Emylie Lentzner, student vice-president.

On 11 October 2019, the board of directors elected Clarisse Berthezène as vice-president and Alexandré Severin as manager of scholarship administrators.

The governance of Paris Cité University is ensured by a president, an executive board, and an Academic Senate that deliberate, by academic and technical bodies that give opinions and orientations.

The president is elected by the executive board for a four-year term, renewable once, from among teacher-researchers, researchers, professors or lecturers, associates or guests. The president is assisted by a vice-president of the executive board, a vice-president of research, a vice-president of education and a vice-president of student affairs.

The executive board comprises twenty-eight members: sixteen representatives elected by and from among the staff and students of Université de Paris and the IPGP, four ex officio members (chairman of the Board of Directors of the IPGP, chairman of the CNRS, chairman of Inserm, director general of Assistance Publique – Hôpitaux de Paris), and eight qualified personalities.

== Rankings ==
University rankings

Global – Overall
- ARWU World: 69 (2023)
- CWUR World: 42 (2022–2023)
- CWTS World: 115 (2022)
- QS World: 300 (2026)
- THE World: =152 (2024)
- USNWR Global: 43 (2024-2025)

== Notable people ==
=== Nobel and Fields laureates ===
- George Fitzgerald Smoot – Professor – Nobel in Physics – 2006
- Jean Dausset – Professor – Nobel in Physiology or Medicine – 1980
- Artur Avila – Professor – Fields Medal – 2014
- Laurent Schwartz – Professor – Fields Medal – 1950

=== Teachers and former teachers ===
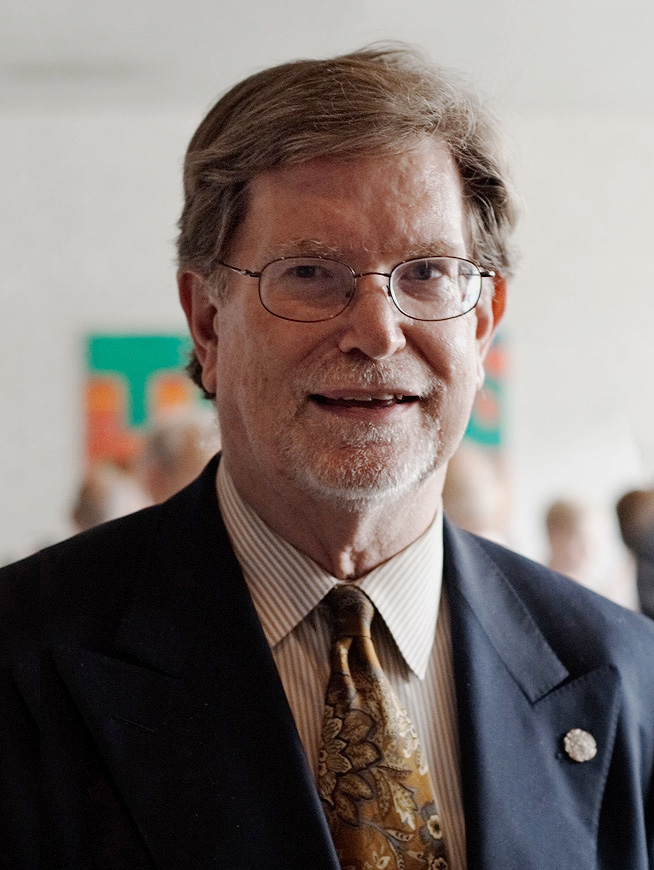
Nobel laureate George Fitzgerald Smoot, professor of the university

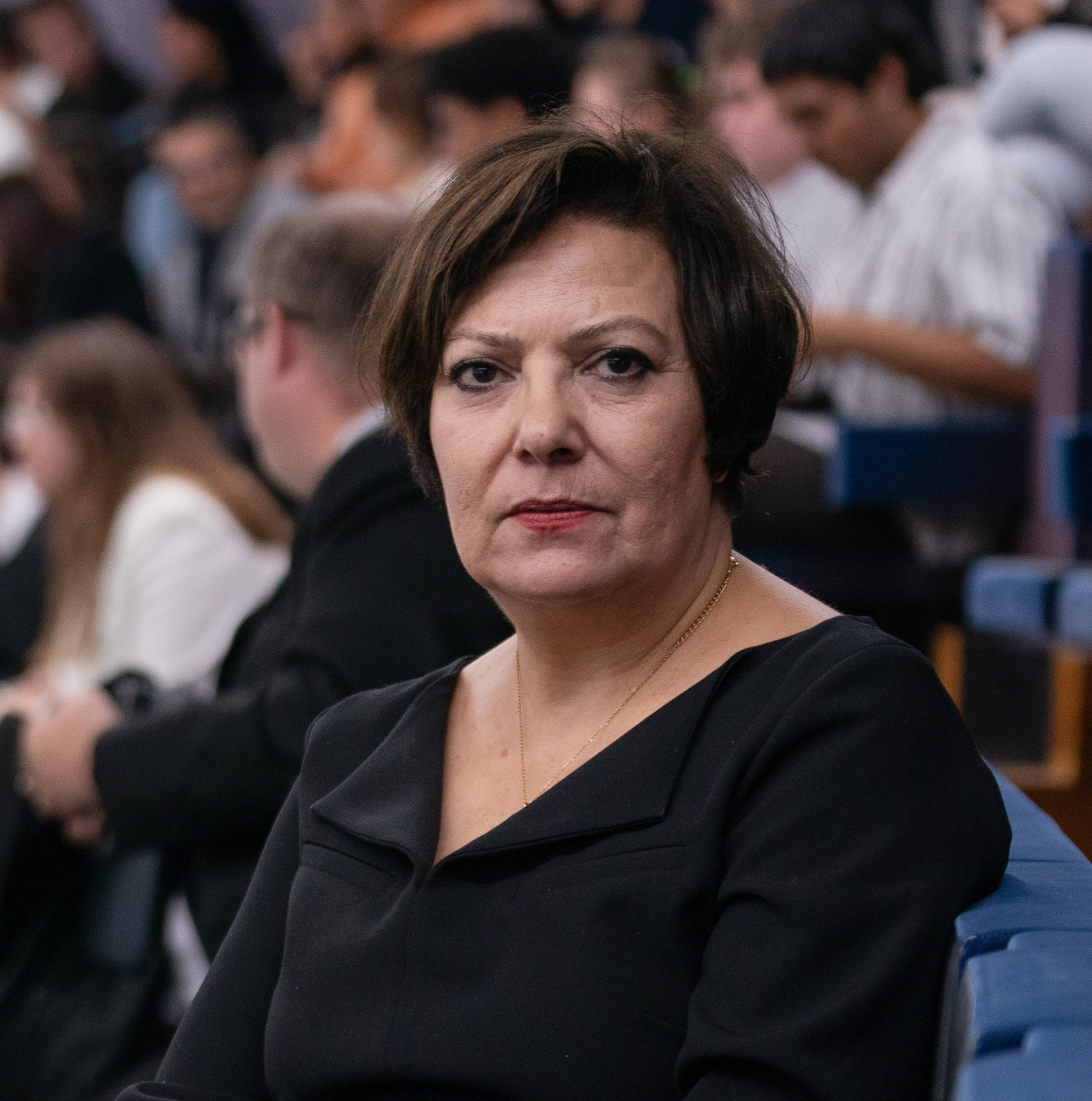
Azadeh Kian (2022) at the European Parliament

- Azadeh Kian (Persian: آزاده کیان), Iranian-French director of the Center for Gender and Feminist Studies and BBC project 100 Women.
- Alain Carpentier, French surgeon, Albert-Lasker Award
- Axel Kahn, French scientist and geneticist
- Daniel Mansuy, French researcher and chemist, member of the French Academy of Sciences
- Jaak Aaviksoo, Estonian Minister of Defense
- Claude Allègre, French Minister of National Education from 1997 to 2000 and member of the Académie des sciences
- Artur Avila, 2014 Fields Medal recipient
- Jean-Luc Bennahmias, French member of the European Parliament
- Bernard Cerquiglini, rector of the Agence universitaire de la Francophonie
- Michel Ciment, French journalist, writer and president of FIPRESCI
- Vincent Courtillot, geophysicist, member of the Académie des sciences
- Jean Dausset, Nobel Prize in Medicine 1980
- Luc Ferry, French minister of National Education from 2002 to 2004
- Erol Gelenbe, professor at Université Paris 5 René Descartes (1986–2005), computer scientist, electronic engineer, and applied mathematician, fellow of the French Academy of Technologies, of the Royal Academy of Science, Letters and Fine Arts of Belgium, of The Science Academy Society of Turkey, the Hungarian Academy of Sciences, the Polish Academy of Sciences, and other academies, Mustafa Prize in 2017.
- Julia Kristeva, Bulgarian-French psychoanalyst, sociologist and feminist
- Thierry Morand, French biocontainment expert and entrepreneur
- Élisabeth Roudinesco, French historian and psychoanalyst
- Jean-Michel Savéant, member of the Académie des sciences
- Laurent Schwartz, 1950 Fields Medal recipient
- Justin E. H. Smith, author and professor of history and philosophy of science
- George Fitzgerald Smoot, Nobel Prize in Physics 2006 for the discovery of anisotropies in the cosmic microwave background radiation
- Stefano Zacchiroli, former Debian project leader
- Marcel-Paul Schützenberger, French mathematician

=== Alumni ===
- Cécile Duflot, French former politician, government minister and political party leader
- Olivier Brandicourt, French business executive and physician, former chief executive officer of Sanofi
- Richard Ferrand, French politician who has been president of the National Assembly since 2018.
- Jean Pisani-Ferry, French economist and public policy expert
- François Fillon, retired French politician who served as Prime Minister of France from 2007 to 2012 under President Nicolas Sarkozy
- Delphine Batho, French politician, member of the French National Assembly and former Minister of Ecology, Sustainable Development and Energy
- Nouria Benghabrit-Remaoun, Algerian sociologist and researcher who serves in the government of Algeria as Minister of National Education
- Jacqueline Dutheil de la Rochère, former president of Panthéon-Assas University
- Sibeth Ndiaye, French-Senegalese communications advisor and former French government spokeswoman
- Freda Nkirote, director of the British Institute in Eastern Africa (BIEA) and president of the Pan-African Archaeological Association
- Nadey Hakim, surgeon and vice president of the Royal Society of Medicine
- Jon Elster, social and political theorist
- Laurent Gbagbo, Ivorian politician who was the president of Côte d'Ivoire
- Jérôme Chartier, French member of the National Assembly of France from 2002 to 2017
- Guillaume Chiche, French member of the French National Assembly
- Keuky Lim, former Minister for Foreign Affairs of the Khmer Republic
- Élizabeth Teissier, astrologist
- Jérôme Salomon, French infectious diseases physician and directeur général de la Santé since 2018.
- Alexandros Giotopoulos, convicted terrorist.
