= Learning Planet Institute =

French non-profit association

- Former name: Centre de Recherches Interdisciplinaires (CRI) (2006 to 2021)
- Type: Non-profit research and training institute
- Established: 2006; 20 years ago
- Affiliations: Paris Cité University
- President: François Taddei
- Location: 8 bis rue Charles V, 75004 Paris, Paris, France; 48.853202°N 2.362711°E
- Language: French, English
- Website: www.learningplanetinstitute.org

The Learning Planet Institute (LPI), known until 2021 as the Centre de Recherches Interdisciplinaires (CRI; "Centre for Interdisciplinary Research"), is a French non-profit association in Paris that conducts research and teaching in the learning sciences and education. The biologists François Taddei and Ariel Lindner founded it in 2006.

The CRI began as a centre for interdisciplinary research in the life sciences, education and digital technology. It later turned its focus to learning and was renamed in 2021. The institute is affiliated with Paris Cité University. In 2025 it became the first United Nations University hub in France and a UNESCO category 2 institute. It runs master's and doctoral programmes, organises the annual LearningPlanet Festival with UNESCO, and launched the Learning Planet Academy in 2026. In 2023 the investigative website Mediapart criticised its management and change of direction.

== History ==
=== Centre de Recherches Interdisciplinaires ===
Taddei and Lindner, both researchers at Inserm (the French National Institute of Health and Medical Research), founded the CRI in 2006. It was attached to the faculty of medicine of Paris Descartes University (Paris V).

In 2006 the researcher David Bikard joined Taddei's team to develop synthetic biology, which Le Monde described as new in France. In 2008 a CRI team won the "fundamental research" prize at iGEM, an international biotechnology competition run by the Massachusetts Institute of Technology (MIT), with €33,000 raised from donors.

The CRI went on to set up several internal programmes built on project-based learning. Les Savanturiers – École de la recherche ("School of Research"), brought the scientific method into schools and after-school activities, for example through a study of ants carried out with myrmecologists. The MakerLab taught through engineering projects, and the Game Lab studied serious games, escape rooms and human-computer interfaces as tools for learning.

Student numbers grew in the early 2010s. The French government's Investissements d'avenir ("Investments for the Future") programme provided additional funding. The centre was then attached jointly to Paris Descartes, Paris Diderot University and Paris-Sorbonne University through the Sorbonne Paris Cité (USPC) Alliance.

Since 2014 the institute has hosted the UNESCO Chair in Learning Sciences, attached to Université Paris Cité.

On 4 October 2018 the CRI opened a new campus at 8 and 10 rue Charles V in the 4th arrondissement of Paris. The site includes the Hôtel de Maillé, a 17th-century private mansion that later housed an industrial dairy.

=== Learning Planet Institute ===
The CRI was renamed the Learning Planet Institute in 2021. The Bettencourt Schueller Foundation funded the institute from 2006 to 2024.

In 2023 Mediapart criticised the institute's management and its move away from the life sciences towards the learning sciences. The article also noted that the institute had started selling coaching, consulting and training services as the foundation's support was being phased out.

In 2025 the LPI became the first United Nations University (UNU) hub in France and was designated a UNESCO category 2 institute.

In 2026 the LPI launched the Learning Planet Academy.

== Governance ==
As of 2023, François Taddei, the institute's co-founder, is its president and holds the title of "chief exploration officer". Gaël Mainguy is its director general.

== Teaching ==
According to Les Échos, the institute's teaching is based on projects, research and exchanges between students, who are given practical autonomy early on. Its undergraduate courses use a flipped classroom model in which students build the course content from their own research. The institute also offers a master's degree and a doctoral programme accredited by Paris Cité University.

=== Learning Planet Academy ===
Since 2025 the institute has developed the Learning Planet Academy, an education programme run with UNESCO and the United Nations. It offers online and in-person courses for students, teachers and executives on team problem solving, critical thinking, science, conservation and sustainability. The academy also uses online tools developed by the institute, including WeLearn, a learning platform on the Sustainable Development Goals based on artificial intelligence.

== LearningPlanet Festival ==
Since 2020 the LPI and UNESCO have held the LearningPlanet Festival each year on the International Day of Education. The 2024 edition was organised with the City of Paris at venues including the Gaîté Lyrique and the Bibliothèque publique d'information ("Public Information Library") at the Centre Pompidou.
