= François Taddei =

French geneticist and education researcher

- Taddéi in 2013
- Born: 5 August 1967 (age 59); Montreuil, France
- Education: École polytechnique
- Awards: Liliane Bettencourt Prize for Life Sciences (2004)
- Scientific career
- Fields: Evolutionary biology, molecular genetics, learning sciences
- Workplaces: Inserm; Paris Descartes University; Learning Planet Institute
- Doctoral advisor: Miroslav Radman

François Taddei (born 5 August 1967) is a French geneticist and education researcher. Trained as an engineer, he worked on the evolutionary and medical genetics of bacteria before turning to education. In 2006 he co-founded the Centre de Recherches Interdisciplinaires (CRI) with Ariel Lindner. The centre was renamed the Learning Planet Institute in 2021, and Taddei is its president. He has written or co-written several reports on the future of education, some of them commissioned by the French government.

== Early life ==
Taddei's father, Dominique Taddei, is an economist, a former university president and a former Socialist Party member of the National Assembly for Vaucluse. His mother worked for a chamber of commerce. The family is of Corsican origin. He went to school in Avignon, where he won the Provence chess championship against adult players. At 15 he toured Italy by bicycle, and at 18 he travelled around Europe by train. During his national service he worked in military hospitals, where he became interested in biology.

He arrived in New York for a research stay at Rockefeller University the day before the September 11 attacks. He has described that event, and the 2005 French riots, as the moments that led him towards civic engagement and education.

== Scientific career ==
Taddei graduated from the École polytechnique and is a chief engineer (ingénieur général) in the Corps of Bridges, Waters and Forests. He holds a doctorate in genetics, supervised by Croatian-French biologist Miroslav Radman, and is a research director at Inserm, the French National Institute of Health and Medical Research. At Paris Descartes University he led a team studying systems engineering and evolutionary dynamics, in particular how bacteria cooperate and coevolve in response to antibiotics. He has published in journals including Nature, Science, PNAS and PLOS. In 2003 he and Radman jointly received the Inserm prize for fundamental research.

== Centre de Recherches Interdisciplinaires ==
In 2006 Taddei and Ariel Lindner, also an Inserm researcher, founded the CRI to bring researchers from different disciplines together. It was housed in a Paris Descartes University building opposite the Cochin Hospital. According to Taddei, student numbers doubled every eighteen months, from about 80 in 2013 to 350 in 2019. The French government's Investissements d'avenir ("Investments for the Future") programme provided additional funding for the centre's move to the Marais neighbourhood of Paris. The centre was later attached jointly to Paris Descartes, Paris Diderot University and Paris-Sorbonne University through the Sorbonne Paris Cité Alliance.

In 2006 the researcher David Bikard joined Taddei's team to work on synthetic biology, which Le Monde described as new in France. In 2008 a CRI team won the "fundamental research" prize at iGEM, an international competition run by the Massachusetts Institute of Technology (MIT), with €33,000 raised from donors.

From 2011 Taddei worked with the Austrian physicist Stefan Thurner, of the Santa Fe Institute and the Medical University of Vienna, on learning through games. Their collaboration led to iGam4ER (International Game Competition for Education and Research), held in Paris. The two also designed an online university based on curiosity-driven learning. According to Austrian newspaper Die Presse, the project drew interest from the United Nations but did not go ahead. Taddei also started a science project for pupils in a deprived suburb of Paris.

In 2014 the CRI held an international conference on the links between research and teaching, attended by 25 academics from countries including China, the United Kingdom and Canada. The same year the CRI obtained a UNESCO chair in the learning sciences, which Le Monde described as focused on innovation in teaching.

In 2021 the CRI became the Learning Planet Institute. Taddei is its president and holds the title of "chief exploration officer". Gaël Mainguy is the institute's director general.

== Work in education ==
=== Advisory roles ===
Taddei has taken part in several working groups on research and higher education. They include "France 2025", a government foresight exercise; the European Commission's work on creativity in education; the national strategy for higher education; and the strategic board of France Université Numérique, the French national MOOC platform. In 2012 the president of the French Economic, Social and Environmental Council appointed him to the last Haut Conseil de l'éducation (High Council for Education).

=== Associations ===
Students from the interdisciplinary master's programme that Taddei founded created Science Ac', an association that has given hundreds of secondary school pupils holiday placements in research laboratories. Taddei also helped launch Paris-Montagne, which organises laboratory visits for secondary school pupils.

=== Views on education ===
In 2010 Taddei criticised the French school system for its low tolerance of mistakes and the little room it gives pupils to ask questions. He has proposed using citizen science and scientific discovery games to open research-based learning to a wider public. One example is the Savanturiers programme, which runs observation projects in schools, such as studies of how certain plants fold their leaves.

In his 2018 book Apprendre au XXIe siècle ("Learning in the 21st century"), Taddei argues that learning works by stabilising random neural connections, a process he presents as common to all types of cells. He also argues that education systems have not prepared for the changes brought by artificial intelligence (AI), and calls for more research and development spending in education.

== Honours and awards ==
- 2003: Inserm prize for fundamental research, shared with Miroslav Radman
- 2004: Liliane Bettencourt Prize for Life Sciences, for research on the evolution and ageing of bacteria
- 2005: European Young Investigator Award (EURYI), for research on the evolution and ageing of bacteria
- 2006: Human Frontier Science Program award
- 2013: Knight of the Ordre des Palmes académiques
- 2017: Prix Montgolfier
- 2018: Knight of the Ordre des Arts et des Lettres
- 2019: Prix Eurêka
- 2020: Honorary doctorate from UCLouvain
