= Paris Diderot University =

Former university in Paris

University of Paris 7
- Université Paris 7
- Type: Public
- Active: 1970; 56 years ago–2019; 7 years ago
- Chancellor: Maurice Quénet; Chancellor of the Universities of Paris
- President: Christine Clerici
- Students: 26,000
- Location: Paris, France; 48°49′47″N 2°22′51″E
- Website: univ-paris-diderot.fr

Paris Diderot University (French: Université Paris Diderot), also known as Paris 7 or Paris VII, was a public university located in Paris, France. It was one of the inheritors of the historic University of Paris, which was split into 13 universities in 1970. Paris Diderot merged with Paris Descartes University in 2019 to form the new University of Paris, which was later renamed Paris Cité University.

With two Nobel Prize laureates, two Fields Medal winners and two former French Ministers of Education among its faculty or former faculty, the university was famous for its teaching in science, especially in mathematics. Many fundamental results of the theory of probability were discovered at one of its research centres, the Laboratoire de Probabilités et Modèles Aléatoires (Laboratory of Probability and Random Models).

== History ==
Paris Diderot University was one of the heirs of the old University of Paris, which ceased to exist in 1970. Professors from the faculties of Science, of Medicine and of Humanities chose then to create a new multidisciplinary university. It adopted its current name in 1994 after the 18th-century French philosopher, art critic and writer Denis Diderot.

Formerly based at the Jussieu Campus, in the 5th arrondissement, the university moved to a new campus in the 13th arrondissement, in the Paris Rive Gauche neighbourhood. The first buildings were brought into use in 2006. The university had many facilities in Paris and two in other places of the general area. In 2012, the university completed its move in its new ultramodern campus.

Paris Diderot University was a founding member of the higher education and research alliance Sorbonne Paris Cité, a public institution for scientific co-operation, bringing together four renowned Parisian universities and four higher education and research institutes.

The university became a member of the Sorbonne Paris University Group on 31 March 2010. It merged with the Paris Descartes University in 2019, gaining its new appellation, the University of Paris.

== List of facilities in Paris ==
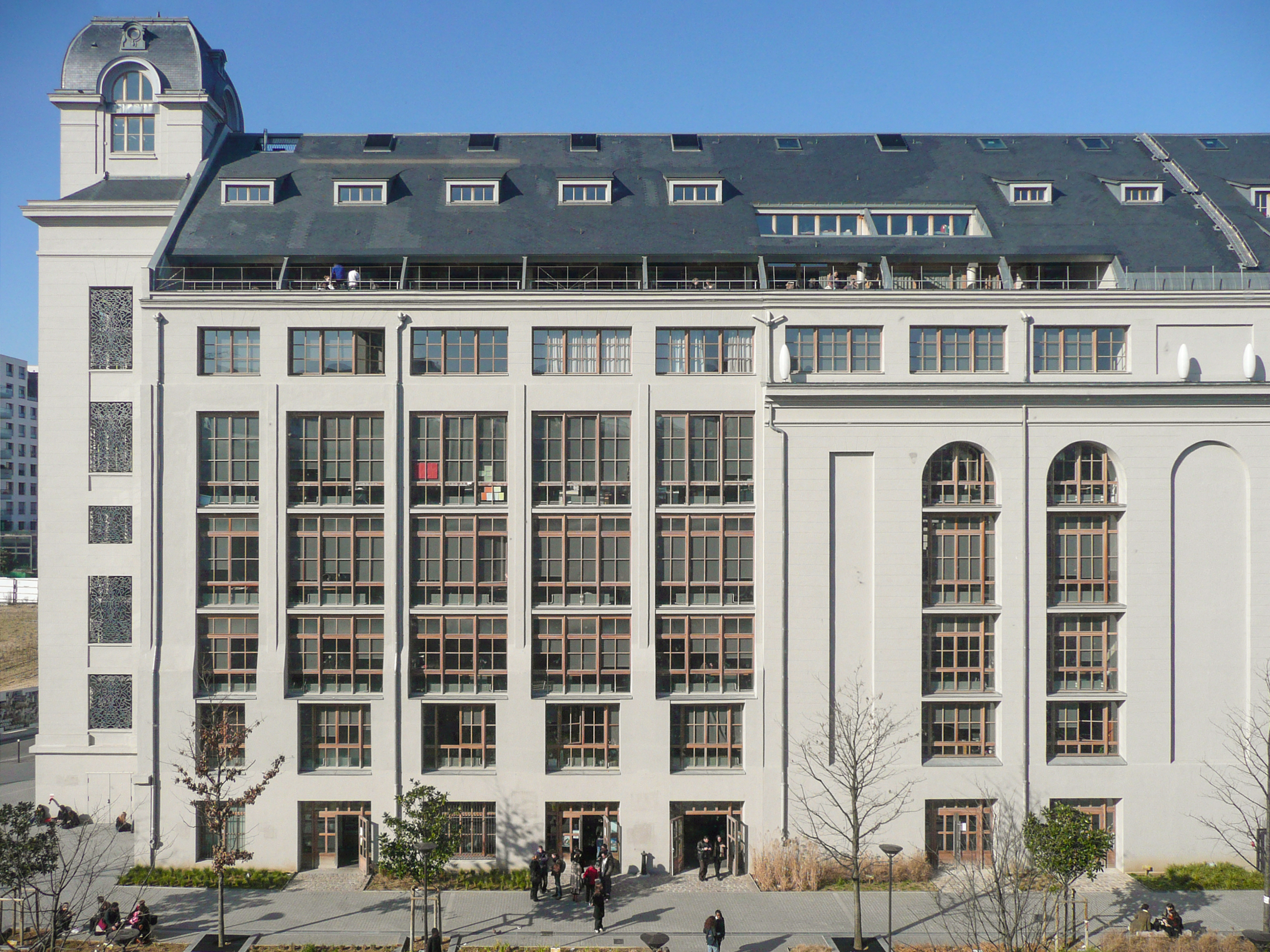
"Grands Moulins de Paris" in PRG

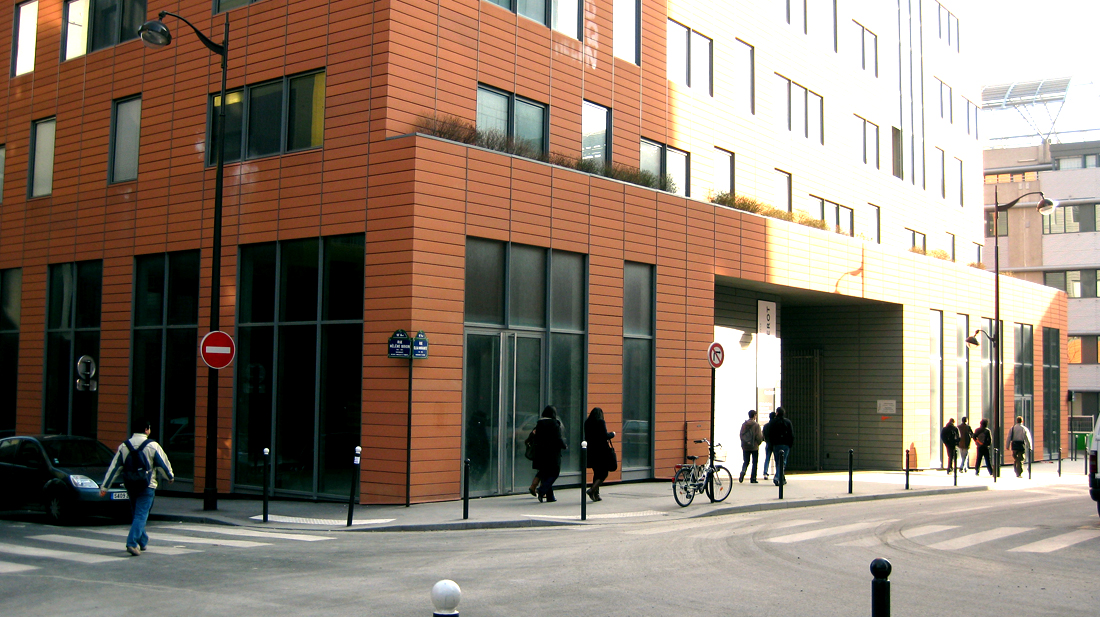
Condorcet building, headquarters of the Department of Physics

There are:

- PRG (Paris Rive Gauche) - Main campus
- Jussieu Campus - former Main campus
- Charles V - English studies
- RFF Building - Administrative offices
- Javelot - Geography, history and social science (GHSS)
- Chateau des Rentiers - Linguistics
- Garancière - Odontology
- Xavier-Bichat - Medicine
- Lariboisière Saint-Louis - Medicine
- St Louis Hospital - Hematology
- Rue de Paradis - Medicine

== UFR (Unité de Formation et de Recherche) ==
Paris Diderot University offers courses in many fields, each taught in a different section of the university designated as a UFR - Unité de Formation et de Recherche (Unit for Teaching and Research).

- UFR of Life Sciences
- UFR of Chemistry
- UFR of Computer Sciences
- UFR of Mathematics
- UFR of Physics
- UFR of Science of the Earth, Environment and Planets
- UFR of English studies
- UFR of Cross-cultural and Applied Languages studies
- UFR of Geography, History and Social sciences
- UFR of Languages and Cultures in East Asia studies (Chinese, Japanese, Korean and Vietnamese)
- UFR of Letters, Art and Cinema
- UFR of Linguistics
- UFR of Psychoanalytical Studies (formerly Human clinical sciences)
- UFR of Social Sciences
- UFR of Medicine
- UFR of Odontology

== Academic degrees ==
There are:

- 1 Diplôme universitaire de technologie (called DUT)
- 27 different bachelor's degrees (Licence)
- 32 different master's degrees (116 specialities)
- 1 Engineering school
- 24 different Ph.D.s (Doctorat)

== Teachers and former teachers ==
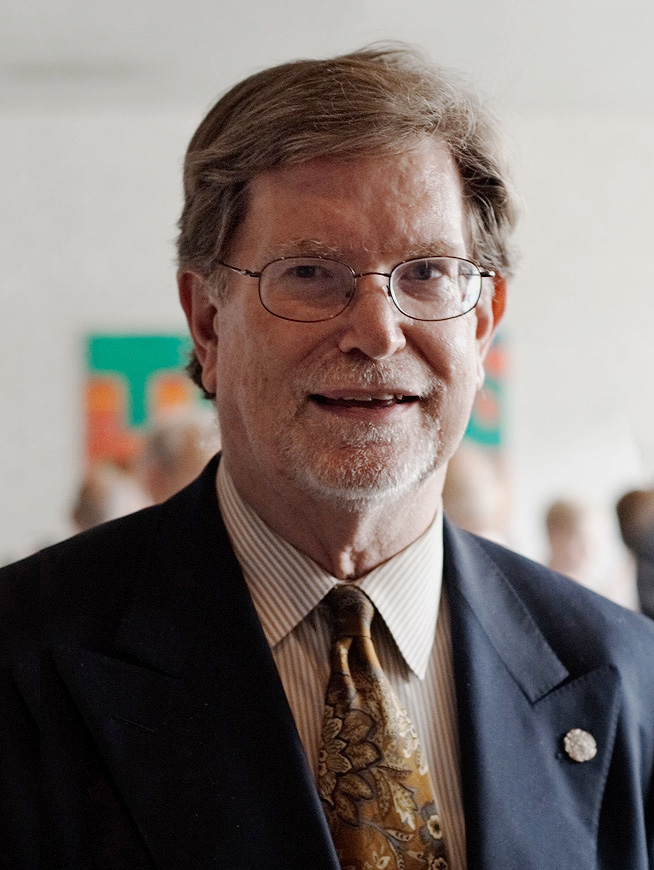
Nobel Laureate George Fitzgerald Smoot, professor of the university

- Jaak Aaviksoo, Estonian Minister of Defense
- Claude Allègre, Minister of National Education (France) from 1997 to 2000 and member of the Académie des sciences (France)
- Artur Avila, 2014 Fields Medal
- Jean-Luc Bennahmias, French Member of the European Parliament
- Bernard Cerquiglini, rector of the Agence universitaire de la Francophonie
- Michel de Certeau, French Jesuit priest, historian and anthropologist
- Michel Ciment, French journalist, writer and president of FIPRESCI
- Vincent Courtillot, geophysicist, member of the Académie des sciences (France)
- Jean Dausset, Nobel Prize in Medicine 1980
- Luc Ferry, French Minister of National Education from 2002 to 2004
- Julia Kristeva, Bulgarian-French psychoanalyst, sociologist and feminist
- Robert Mallet, writer
- Thierry Morand, French biocontainment expert and entrepreneur.
- Élisabeth Roudinesco, French historian and psychoanalyst
- Jean-Michel Savéant, member of the Académie des sciences (France)
- Marcel-Paul Schützenberger, French mathematician
- Laurent Schwartz, 1950 Fields Medal,
- Justin E. H. Smith, author and professor of history and philosophy of science
- George Fitzgerald Smoot, Nobel Prize in Physics 2006 for the discovery of anisotropies in the cosmic microwave background radiation
- Yazdan Yazdanpanah, infectiologist
- Stefano Zacchiroli, Former Debian Project Leader

== Noted alumnae ==
- Christine Bard Founder of the Archives du féminisme
