= Parc Rives-de-Seine =

Public park and promenade in Paris, France

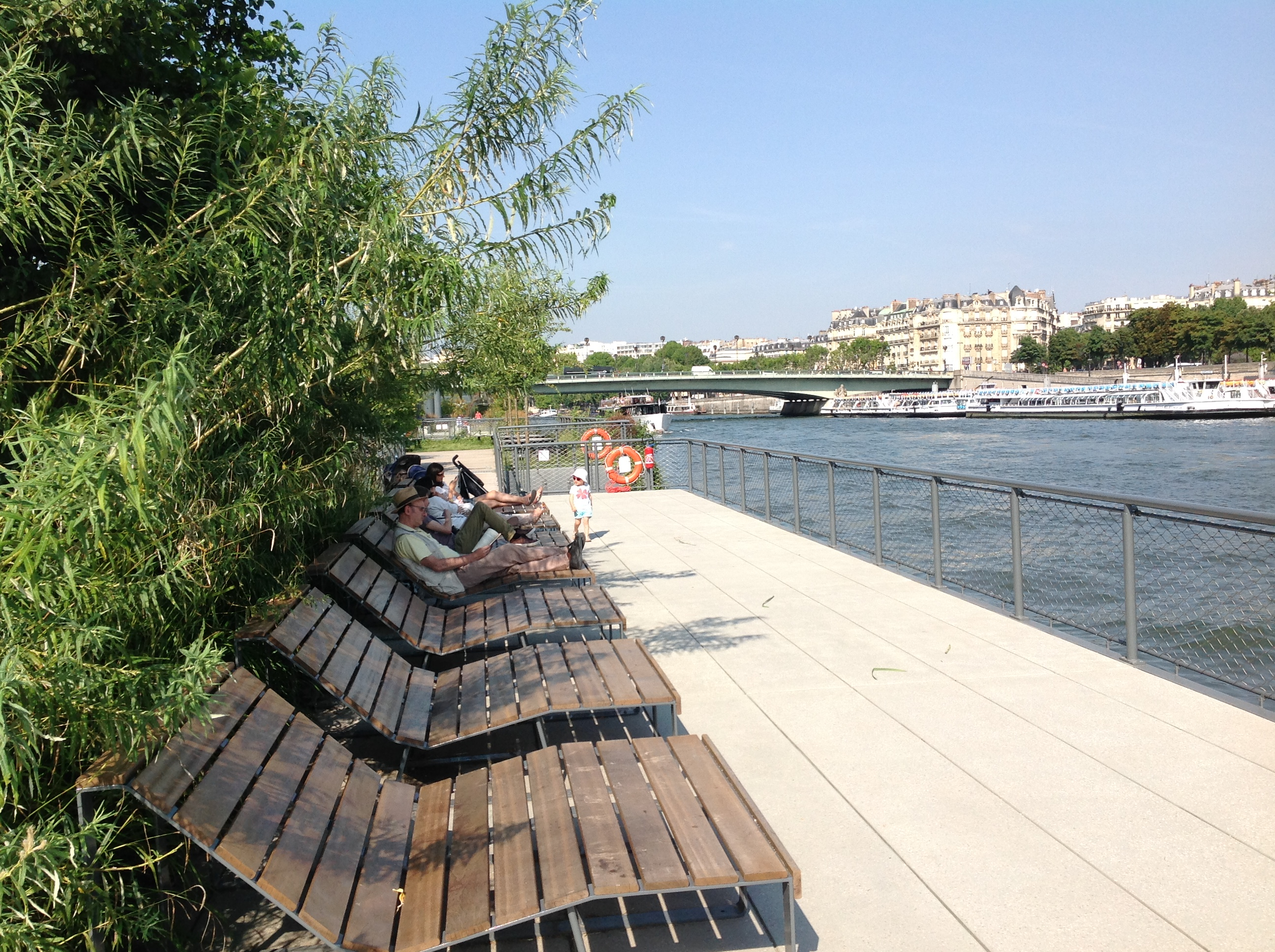
One of the floating gardens along the Promenade des Berges de la Seine in the 7th arrondissement

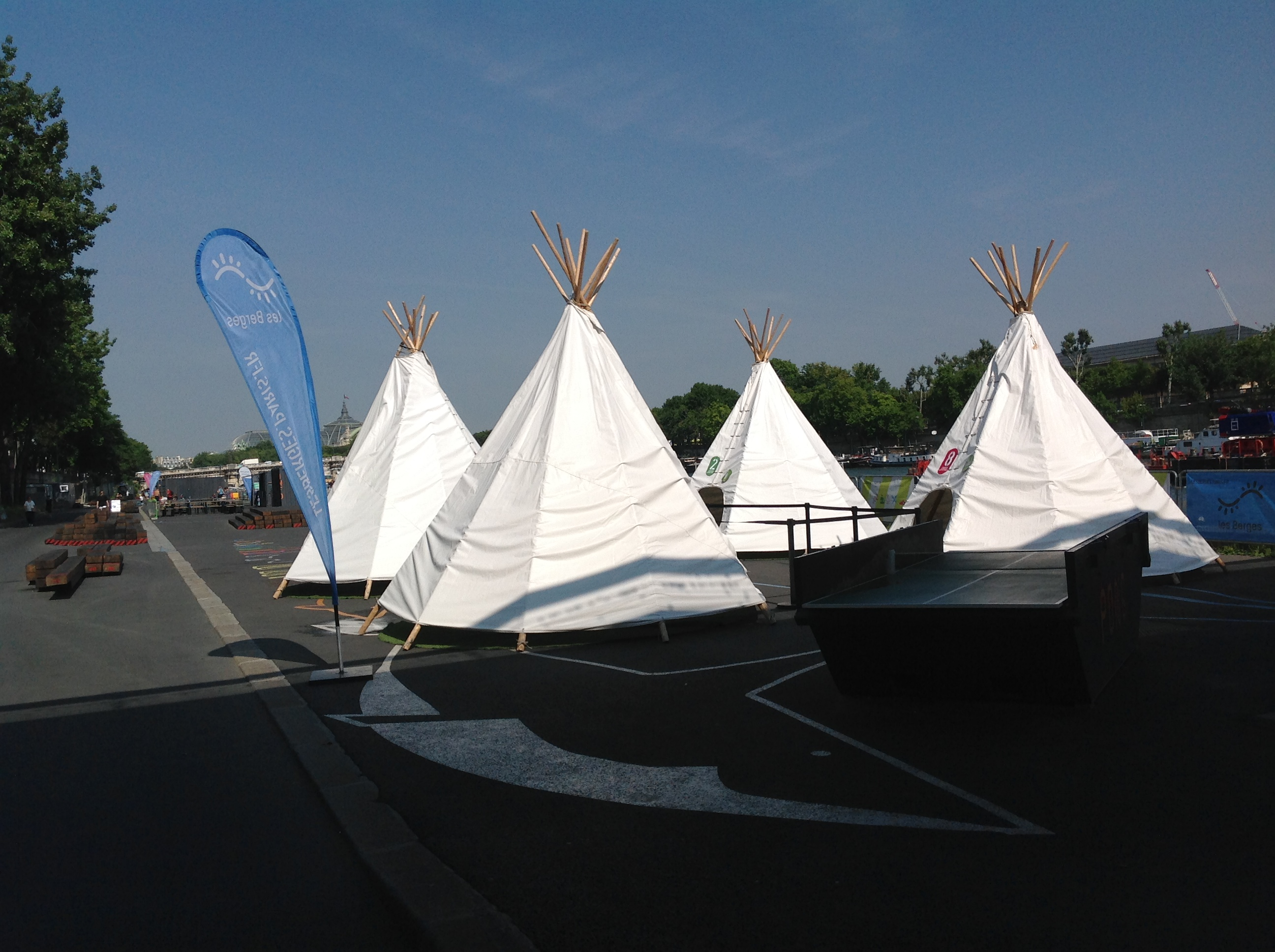
Tipis located along the Promenade des Berges de la Seine. They can be reserved for meetings or celebrations.

Parc Rives-de-Seine is an urban park in Paris, essentially consisting of two former limited-access roads, made carfree, on both banks of the Seine: the voie express Rive-gauche (right bank) and the voie Georges-Pompidou (right bank). In its original size (left bank only) the park was called Promenade des Berges de la Seine.

== Left bank ==
The Promenade des Berges de la Seine is a public park and promenade situated along the left bank of the Seine in the 7th arrondissement of Paris, between the Pont de l'Alma and the Musée d'Orsay. Created on the former limited-access road (voie express du rive gauche) that ran along the left bank, the promenade includes five floating gardens planted atop barges, as well as exhibition areas, performance and classroom spaces, playgrounds, sports facilities, and cafes. The project began in 2008 and was opened by Mayor Bertrand Delanoë on June 19, 2013. All structures in the park are designed to be dismantled and moved within 24 hours should the river's water level rise too high.

== History of the left bank ==
The first quay along the Seine, the Quai des Grand-Augustins, was built at the beginning of the 16th century. By the early 19th century, the riverbanks were fully paved and developed; the site of the modern park was occupied by a depot for building stones, docks, and some waterfront cafes. In the early 20th century, a floating swimming pool was located there. Between 1961 and 1967, a highway was constructed along the river to reduce traffic in the city center. In 1991, the banks of the Seine were designated a UNESCO cultural site, and efforts began to transform the waterfront into a park. Starting in 2001, the highway was closed to traffic on Sundays and used by pedestrians and runners. In 2008, under Mayor Bertrand Delanoe, a project was approved to convert the section of the highway from the Musee D'Orsay to the Pont de l'Alma into a permanent public promenade.

Architect Franklin Azzi designed the promenade, while Jean Christophe Chobet created a series of five floating gardens. The project cost 35 million euros, and was inaugurated by Mayor Delanoe on June 19, 2013.

== History of the right bank ==
France's then-prime minister, Georges Pompidou, opened the 13-kilometer expressway in 1967.

From 2002, part of the highway became a beach in summer, known as Paris-Plages and visited by 4 million people annually (as of 2007).

Cars were banned on the left bank of the Seine in 2013 and on the right bank in 2017, after several years of experiments. The removal of the car road happened under the mayors Bertrand Delanoë and Anne Hidalgo, the latter calling the process "a "reconquest" of the city for its residents.

This development is seen as a key example of a trend in Europe and around the world of cities discouraging cars from their roads.

Before the road was closed to them, 43,000 cars used the road daily. While some protested against the removal of cars, the majority supported it.

== Description ==
=== Left bank ===
The promenade is 2.3 kilometers long and covers an area of 4.5 hectares. It is accessible via the former onramps and offramps that once served the highway.

The most distinctive feature of the park is the floating garden, composed of five "islands," or barges, permanently moored to the riverbank at the port du Gros Caillou, near the Pont de l'Alma. The "islands" are planted with approximately sixty trees, 280 bushes, and three thousand other plants, and offer benches and chairs for relaxation by the river. They are securely anchored to the riverbed and designed to withstand a flood exceeding that of the great Paris flood of 1910.

Another notable feature of the promenade is a group of tipis available for hire, and a collection of cargo containers with large glass windows that have been converted into meeting rooms, rentable for parties, banquets, or meetings.

The promenade features several playgrounds, a climbing wall, and a course for gymnastics and exercises. It also provides meeting spaces for dance and sports classes, performance spaces, open-air classrooms, and an area for outdoor photo exhibits. Several outdoor cafes are located near the bridges along the promenade.

Because the park is situated just above the level of the river, and well below the street level of Paris, all the equipment and structures in the park are designed to be portable. With twenty-four hours' notice, everything moveable can be taken to higher ground in the event of flooding.

== See also ==
- History of parks and gardens of Paris
- List of parks and gardens in Paris
