= Vincent Courtillot =

French geophysicist holding climate-skeptical positions

Vincent E. Courtillot
- Born: 6 March 1948 (age 78); Neuilly-sur-Seine, France
- Education: Mines ParisTech; Stanford University; University of Paris-6
- Awards: Chevalier de la Légion d'Honneur (1994)
- Scientific career
- Fields: Paleomagnetism, geodynamic, volcanic traps, hotspots
- Workplaces: Institut de Physique du Globe de Paris

Vincent E. Courtillot (French: [vɛ̃sɑ̃ kuʁtijo]; born 6 March 1948) is an emeritus French geophysicist, prominent among the researchers who are critical of the hypothesis that impact events are a primary cause of mass extinction of life forms on the Earth. He is known for his book La Vie en catastrophes (Paris, Fayard, 1995), translated into English as Evolutionary catastrophes (1999).

== Biography ==
Courtillot is an engineer from the École nationale supérieure des Mines de Paris. He then studied at Stanford University. In 1974, he was awarded a doctorate by University Paris 6 and in 1977 a state doctorate by University Paris 7.

He has pursued an academic career in France and the United States, including teaching stints at Caltech and the University of Minnesota, and work with the Institut de Physique du Globe de Paris (where he has been director since 2004), and the Ministry of National Education in France. (From 1998 to 2001 Courtillot served under Claude Allègre as director of research when Allègre was Minister for National Education, Research and Technology.) Courtillot is currently Professor of Geophysics at the Paris Diderot University. He has published in excess of 150 papers in scientific journals, with some emphasis on the specialty of paleomagnetism; he has served as editorial advisor to the French journal La Recherche.

Vincent Courtillot was elected to membership in the French Academy of Sciences in November 2003. He is also a member of the Fondation Ecologie d'Avenir since 2011.

== Research ==
Courtillot favors the hypothesis that major mass extinctions are caused by massive episodes of vulcanism: that the Permian-Triassic (P/T) extinction that ended the Paleozoic Era was caused by the Siberian Traps eruption, and the Cretaceous–Paleogene extinction event that ended the Mesozoic Era was caused by the Deccan Traps vulcanism in India. His position is generally in opposition to the hypothesis famously championed by Luis Alvarez and Walter Alvarez, that the K/T extinction that saw the end of the non-avian dinosaurs was primarily due to the asteroid impact at Chicxulub on the Yucatan Peninsula. However, Courtillot does not dispute the scientifically-determined facts of the Chicxulub impact; rather, he argues that the totality of the available evidence supports a thesis that mass extinctions are generally caused by volcanic action.

== Magnetic field and climate ==
He is currently at the centre of a scientific controversy regarding the publication of one of his papers in the journal Earth and Planetary Science Letters (EPSL) entitled "Are there connections between the Earth's magnetic field and climate?" by V. Courtillot, Y. Gallet, J.-L. Le Mouël, F. Fluteau, A. Genevey (2007) EPSL 253, 328. There have been articles in Le Monde on 15 January 2008, and in Science on 11 January 2008 concerning the debate over this paper.

He is usually considered to be a global warming denier, often associated with Claude Allègre. Vincent Courtillot asserted that his collaboration with oil companies Total and Schlumberger on CO_{2} sequestration (CCS) has no influence on his research and results.

== See also ==
- Scientific opinion on climate change
- Solar variation and its geomagnetic effects
- Henrik Svensmark: effect of cosmic rays on cloud cover

== Selected publications ==
- Vincent Courtillot, Jean Besse, Didier Vandamme, Raymond Montigny, Jean-Jacques Jaeger and Henri Cappetta (November 1986). "Deccan flood basalts at the Cretaceous/Tertiary boundary?". Earth and Planetary Science Letters. 80 (3–4): 361–374. Bibcode:1986E&PSL..80..361C. doi:10.1016/0012-821X(86)90118-4.
- Mark A. Richards; Robert A. Duncan & Vincent E. Courtillot (6 October 1989). "Flood Basalts and Hot-Spot Tracks: Plume Heads and Tails". Science. 246 (4926): 103–107. Bibcode:1989Sci...246..103R. doi:10.1126/science.246.4926.103. PMID 17837768. S2CID 9147772.
- Courtillot, Vincent (1994). "Mass extinctions in the last 300 million years: One impact and seven flood basalts?". Israel Journal of Earth Sciences. 43: 255–266.
- Courtillot, Vincent (1999). Evolutionary Catastrophes: the Science of Mass Extinction. Cambridge: Cambridge University Press. Translator: Joe McClinton
- V. Courtillot, Y. Gallet, R. Rocchia, G. Féraud, E. Robin, C. Hofmann, N. Bhandari and Z. G. Ghevariya (30 October 2000). "Cosmic markers, 40Ar/39Ar dating and paleomagnetism of the KT sections in the Anjar Area of the Deccan large igneous province" (PDF). Earth and Planetary Science Letters. 182 (2): 137–156. Bibcode:2000E&PSL.182..137C. doi:10.1016/S0012-821X(00)00238-7.
- Vincent E. Courtillot & Paul R. Renne (January 2003). "On the ages of flood basalt events". Comptes Rendus Geoscience. 335 (1): 113–140. Bibcode:2003CRGeo.335..113C. doi:10.1016/S1631-0713(03)00006-3.
- Vincent Courtillot, Yves Gallet, Jean-Louis Le Mouël, Frédéric Fluteau and Agnès Genevey (30 January 2007). "Are there connections between the Earth's magnetic field and climate?". Earth and Planetary Science Letters. 253 (3–4): 328–339. Bibcode:2007E&PSL.253..328C. doi:10.1016/j.epsl.2006.10.032.

== Books in French ==
- Courtillot, Vincent (1995). La vie en catastrophes. Paris: Fayard. ISBN 978-2-213-59511-5.
- Courtillot, Vincent (September 2009). Nouveau voyage au centre de la Terre. Paris: Éditions Odile Jacob. ISBN 978-2-7381-1939-1.
- Courtillot, Vincent (April 2008). "Quelques éléments de débat scientifique dans la question du changement climatique" (PDF). Annales des Mines, Responsabilité et Environnement. 50 (2): 87–93. doi:10.3917/re.050.0087.
