= The Great Mills of Paris =

Campus in Paris, France

Coordinates: 48.8297°N 2.3811°E

- Paris Cité University Campus
- Grands Moulins
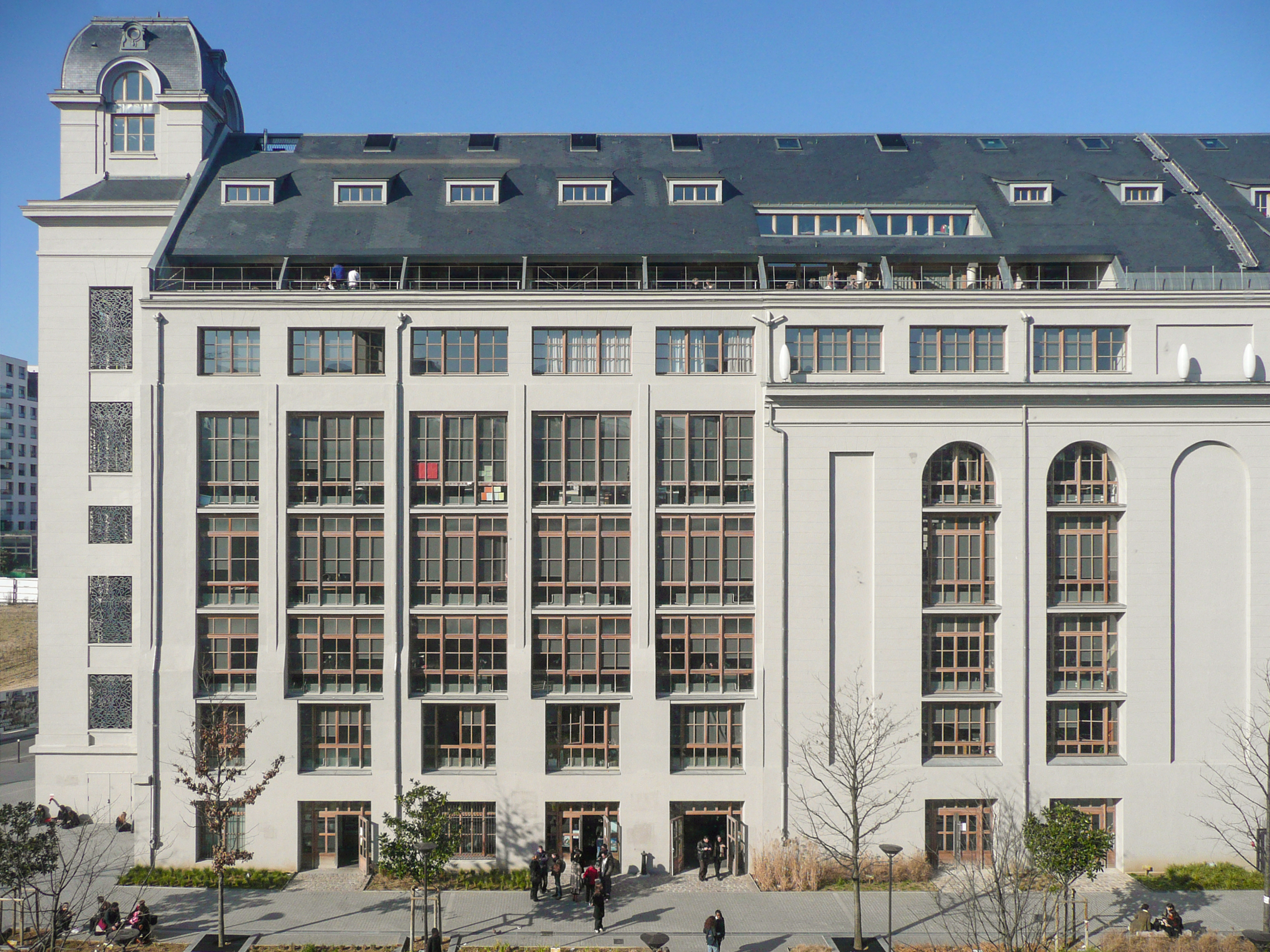
- The main, historic building on the Grands Moulins campus.
- Interactive map of The Great Mills of Paris
- Country: France
- Region: Île-de-France
- Ville: Paris
- Arrondissement: 13th
- University: Paris Cité University
- Named for: Grands Moulins de Paris

Area
  - Total: 15 ha (38 acres)

Population
  - Total: 25,889 students
- Postal code: 75013

The Great Mills of Paris (Grands Moulins de Paris) is the second main campus of Paris Cité University after the Latin Quarter, located on the Quai Panhard-et-Levassor, Paris. Historically, they are former industrial flour mills built in Paris during World War I.

This campus is part of the Paris Rive Gauche development project, in the area known as “quartier de la Gare”, in the 13th arrondissement of Paris. Unlike the Latin Quarter, which is an urban campus shared by several Paris universities, the Grands Moulins campus belongs entirely to Paris Cité University.

== History and description ==
The whole of the merchant mills was built by architect Georges Wybo between 1917 and 1921. With the activity relocating in Gennevilliers and in Verneuil-l'Étang (two cities just outside of Paris), the Parisian flourmills closed in 1996. A major part of the subsidiary buildings, among which the silos and warehouses, were then pulled down except for the main structure, which was shaped in the form of a quadrangle and in neo-classical style, as well as the largest storage hall: both of these have remained. One part got damaged by fire in 1997.

The main building was renovated by architect Rudy Ricciotti between 2004 and 2006, as was the old “Grain Hall” ("Halle aux farines"), located close by, to be used as the campus for Paris VII – Denis Diderot University.

This building houses the administrative services of Paris Cité University, as well as the EALC Department (Eastern Asian Languages and Civilization) and the LHS Department (Arts and Science), along with the Grands Moulins Library.
