= Franklin Azzi =

French architect

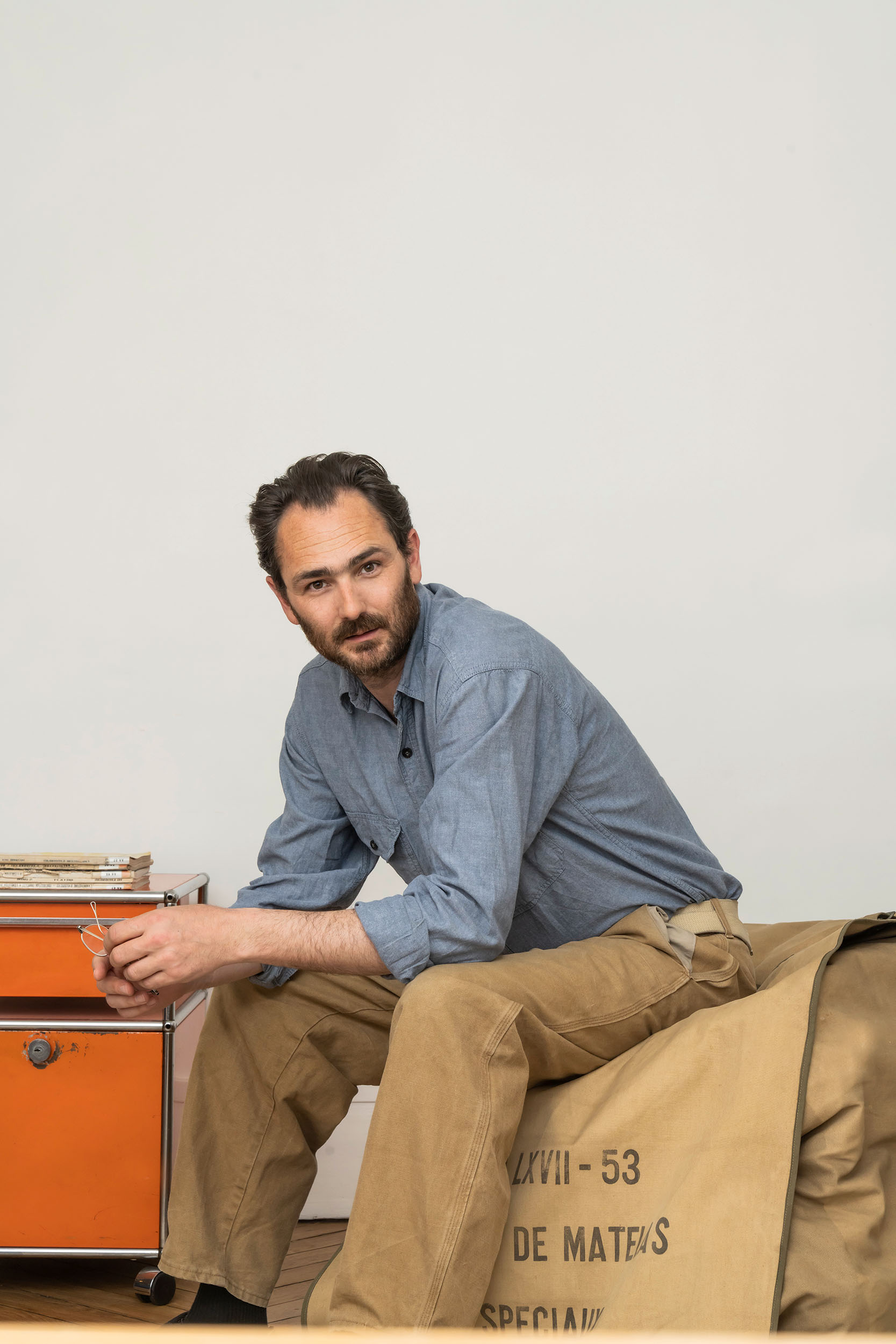
- Born: 12 August 1975 (age 51); Paris
- Education: École Spéciale d'Architecture (Paris) Glasgow School of Art
- Occupation: Architect
- Awards: Albums des Jeunes Architectes et Paysagistes - AJAP (2007/2008)
- Practice: DESA en 2000
- Projects: École Supérieure des Beaux-Arts de Nantes Métropole - Halles Alstom, Ile de Nantes, France Reconversion des imprimeries Mame en École Supérieure des Beaux Arts, Tours, France Tri Postal et Gare Saint-Sauveur, Lille, France, Berges de Seine Rive Gauche, Paris, France
- Website: http://www.franklinazzi.fr/en

Franklin Azzi (French: [fʁɑ̃klɛ̃ azzi]; born 12 August 1975 in Paris), is a French architect. He is a graduate from the École Spéciale d'Architecture, and the Glasgow School of Art. He is the founder of Franklin Azzi Architecture, an agency based in the 2nd arrondissement of Paris.

== Early life and education ==
During his years of obligatory military service, Azzi did his first architectural works, in India and Turkey. He studied at the ESA École Spéciale d'Architecture, where he had a significant encounter with Paul Virilio, a French cultural theorist and urbanist. His practice mixing different areas of applied arts with architecture was inspired by his time at the Glasgow School of Art, where interdisciplinary studies are highly encouraged.

== Career ==
Since 2006, Azzi has been head of Franklin Azzi Architecture, a multidisciplinary team, including architects, interior designers, decorators, graphic designers, art historians, and also parametric design researchers. His first project with public funding was the Center for American Francophonie in Québec City. He then completed other public projects, the restoration of the Alstom halls in Nantes, which now hosts the school of the fr:École supérieure des beaux-arts de Nantes Métropole; the restructuring of the Mame Printing Houses in Tours, a 1950 building by Bernard Zehrfuss and Jean Prouvé; the reconversion of the Tri Postal and the Gare Saint-Sauveur into two cultural centers, in Lille. In 2013, he worked with the City of Paris on the redevelopment of the Banks of the Seine, turning 2,5 kilometers of embankment into a pedestrian area.

He also completed private projects: the Docks in Saint-Ouen, the seat of La Française Group, in Paris, the first Mama Shelter tower in Dubai, for the AccorHotels group. He took part in the Grand Paris Express project with the Chevilly-Larue station. In 2017, he was chosen to lead « the Tour Montparnasse metamorphosis », with the Nouvelle AOM team.

Azzi has always considered his work as "global architecture", as he has had a multidisciplinary background. In 2014, he founded Franklin Azzi Design, with Noemie Goddard. He collaborated with artists like Tatiana Trouvé, designers like Robert Carr, but also fashion designers, such as Bali Barret, Christophe Lemaire and Isabel Marant.

== Projects ==
=== Current projects ===
- Laureate of the international contest for the rehabilitation of the Tour Montparnasse, with the Nouvelle AOM group, Paris, France.

In July 2016, an international contest was launched for the metamorphosis of the Tour Montparnasse, with 700 international architecture agencies participating. His agency joined two other Parisian agencies (Chartier Dalix Architectes and Hardel et Le Bihan Architectes) to form the Nouvelle AOM group, and submit a proposition. They set their design workshop in the 44th floor of the Tower. In September 2017, the Nouvelle AOM group won and revealed their rehabilitation project, focusing on redefining the visual identity of the Tower, but also on comfort and energetic performances issues. The construction works are planned to last from 2019 to 2023, so that the Tower will be ready for the 2024 Olympics in Paris.

- Mama Shelter Tower for the AccordHotels group, Dubai
- Technicolor headquarters, rue du Renard, Paris
- Arche de la Défense Campus, Puteaux, France&
- Workstation Tower, La Défense, Courbevoie, France
- Bac Raspail Grenelle - Emerige, Paris, France
- Grand Paris Express Station, Chevilly, France

=== Cultural centers ===
- 2007 Center for American Francophonie, Québec City, Canada
- 2009: Saint Sauveur Station, Lille, France
- 2010: Tri postal, Lille, France
- 2015: Mame Printing Houses, Tours, France

=== Stores ===
His first stores for Bali Barret in Japan were inaugurated in 2004. Since then, he achieved many projects for Isabel Marant, Christophe Lemaire, John Galliano, H&M or Lacoste.

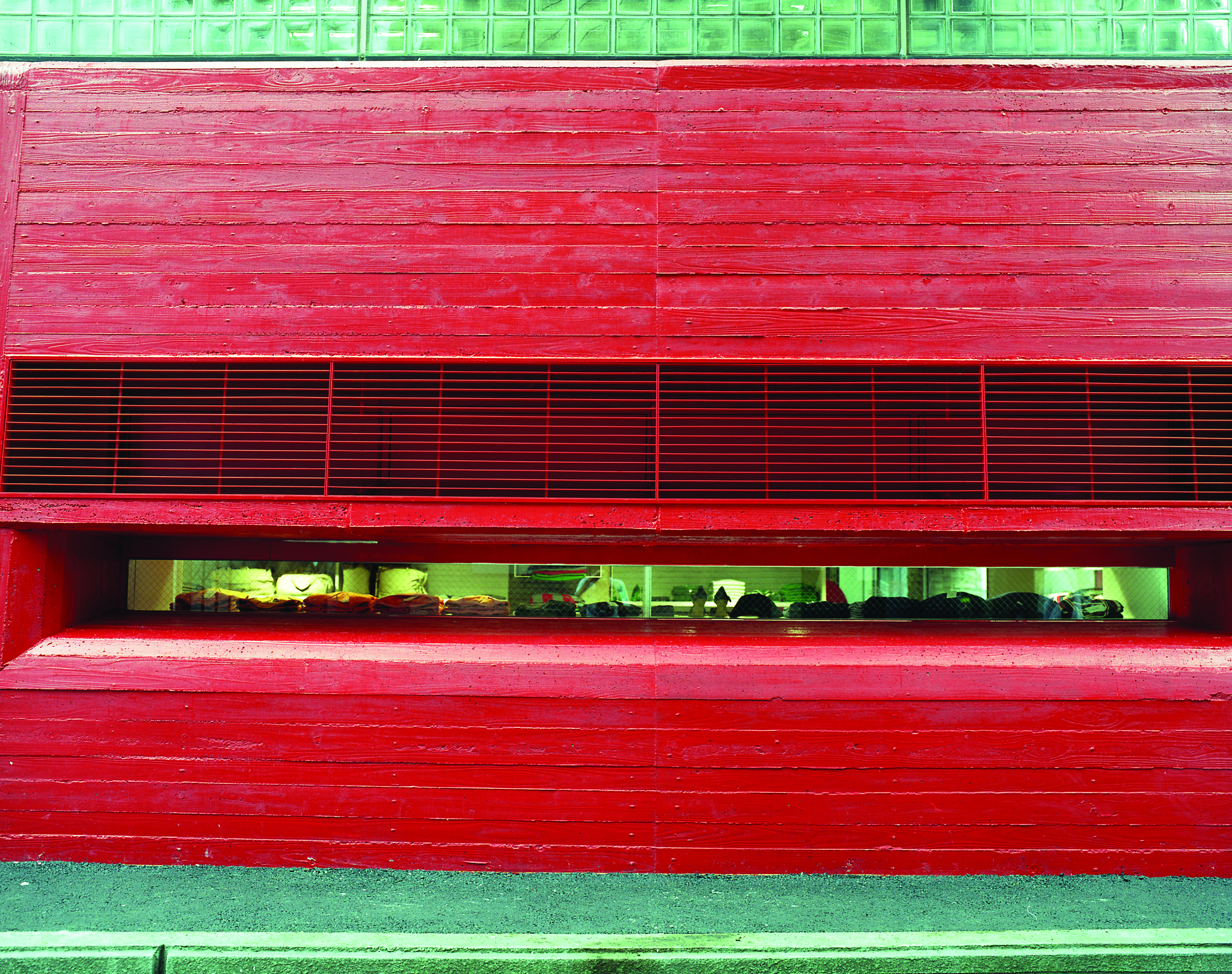
Bali Barret store in Tokyo.

=== Headquarters and offices ===
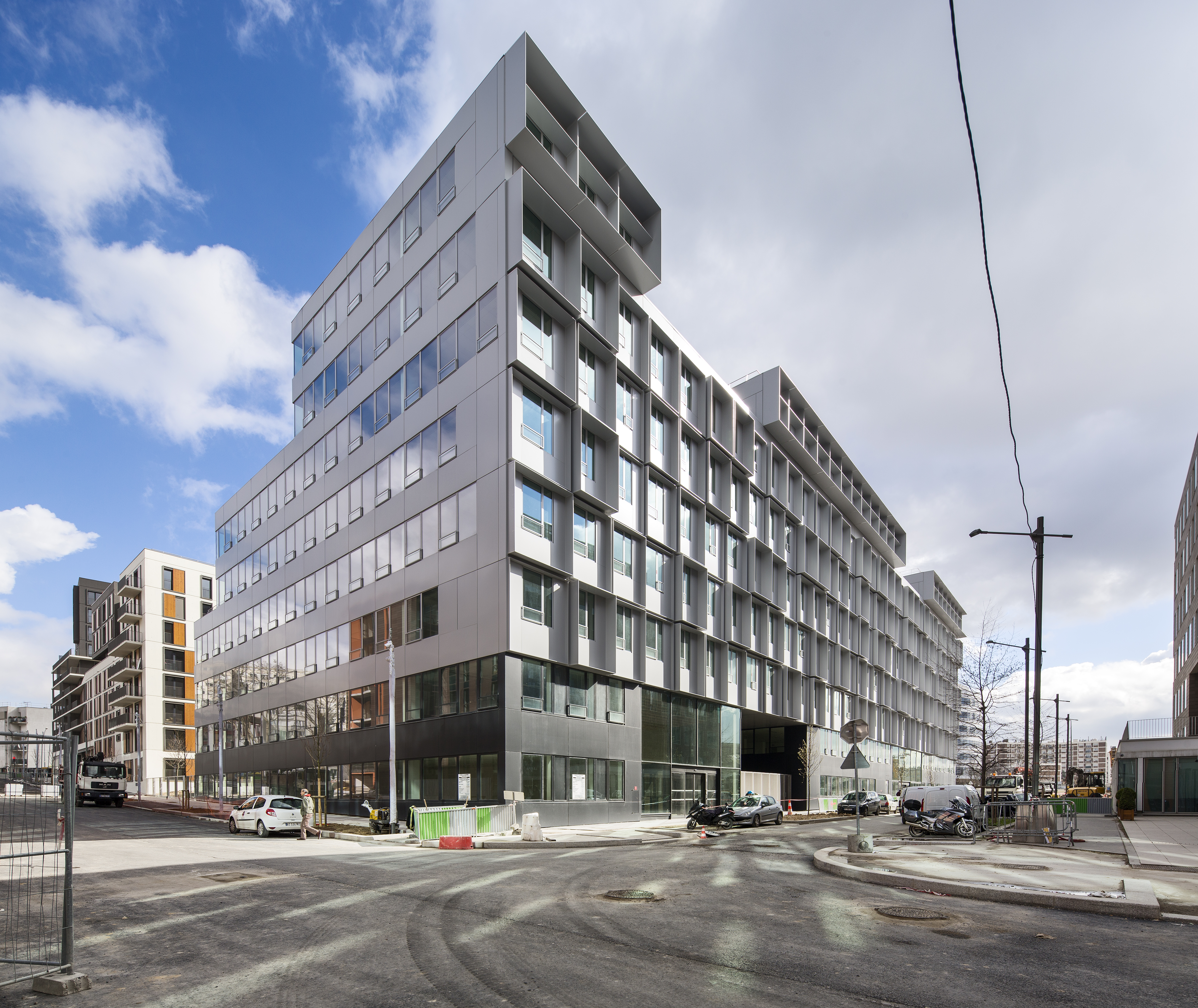
The Dock of Saint-Ouen is a harbour site, rehabilitated into an eco-district. Credits : Luc Boegly

- 2012 : Isabel Marant headquarters, Paris, France
- 2013 : Docks en Seine, Saint-Ouen, France
- 2015 : La Française headquarters, Paris, France

=== Restaurants ===
- 2010 : « Théâtre du Renard », Paris, France
- 2013 : Le Yoyo - Palais de Tokyo, Paris, France&
- 2016 : Holiday Café, Paris, France
- 2017 : Blend Restaurants, Paris, France

=== Housing ===
- 2007 : Maison VW, Yport, France
- 2013 : Cardinet Chalabre, Paris, France

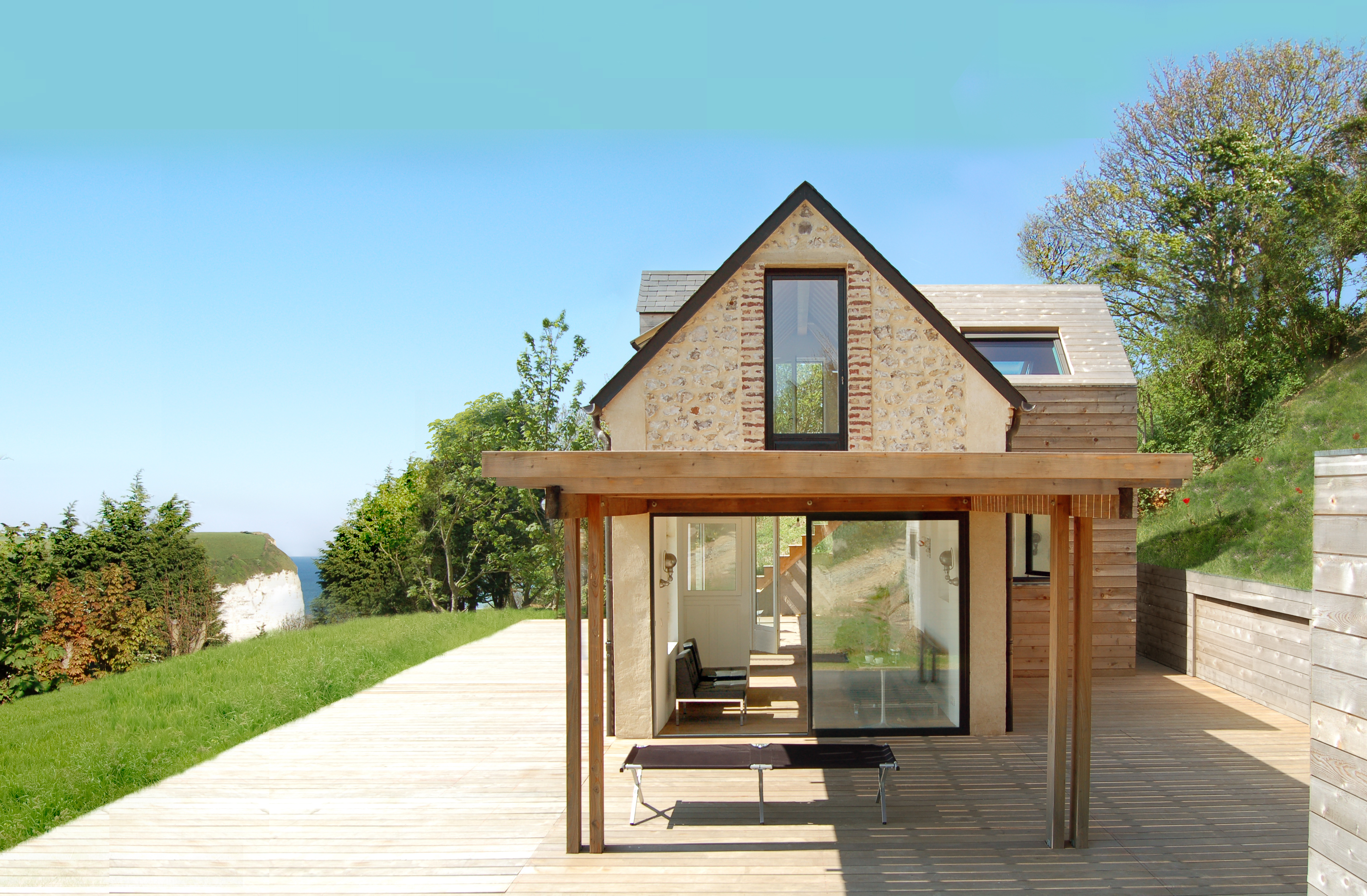
Forestry pavilion, located near Étretat, in Normandy.

=== Urban facilities ===
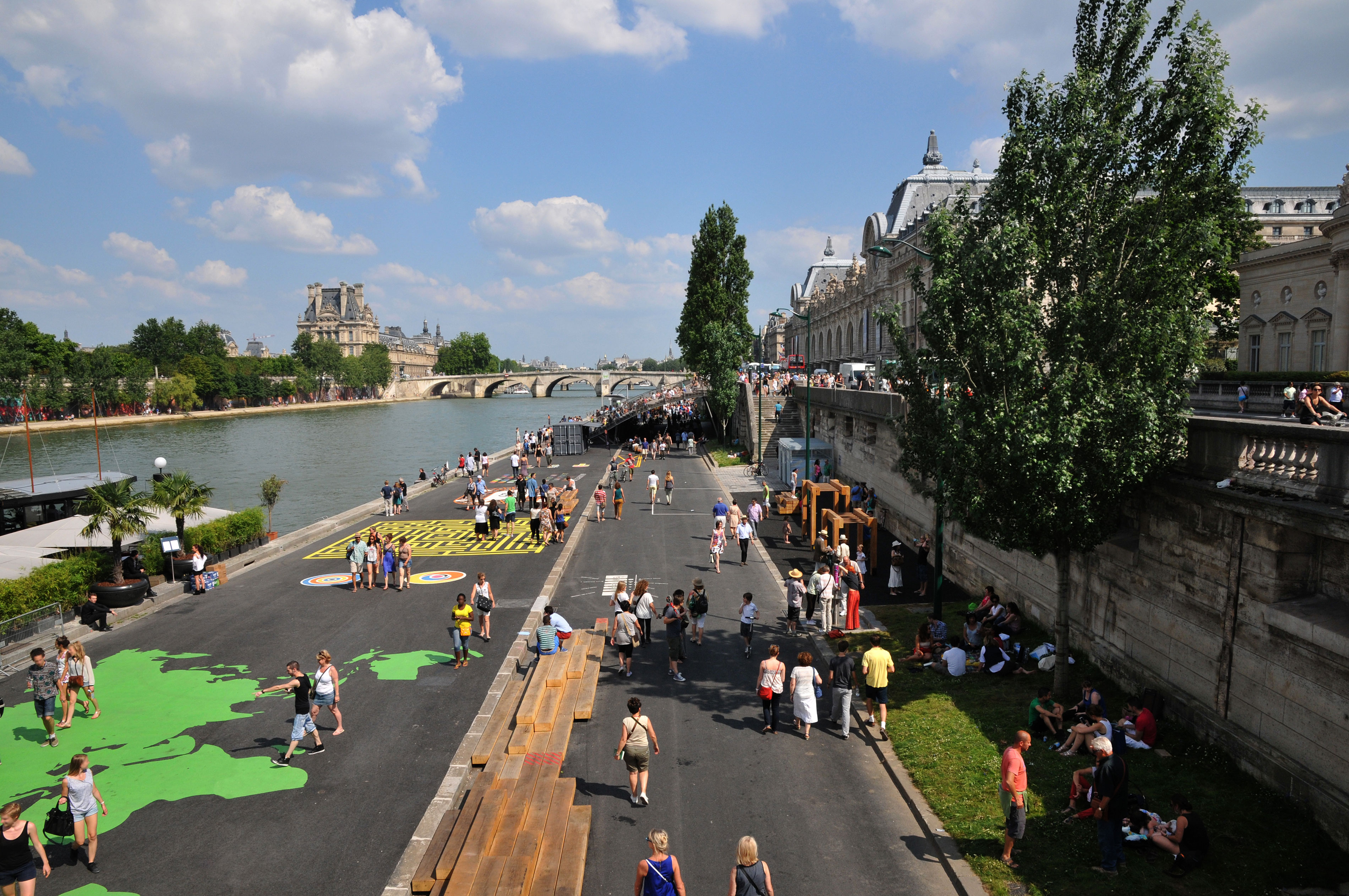
Berges de Seine in the heart of Paris.

- 2013 : Berges de Seine, Paris, France
- 2017 : Halles Alstom, île de Nantes, France

=== Installations ===
- 2009 : Installations in the Grands Moulins, Paris, France
- 2010 : Pavillon Lille Europe for the Universal Exhibition, Shanghai, China

=== Exhibitions ===
- 2007 : Exo-Architecture at the Pavillon de l'Arsenal
- 2014 : "One building, how many lives ?" at the Cité de l'Architecture et du Patrimoine

== Publications ==
=== Monographs ===
- IN/OUT : Franklin Azzi Architecture, Ante Prima/AAM editions, 2014 (in French and in English)

=== Bibliography ===
- 2008 : You can be young and an architect, based on the true story of Lan Architecture, p. 8-27.
- 2008 : Les salons de l'IFA (Dinner n°11), p. 100-105.
- 2008 : Strike a pose : eccentric architecture and spectacular spaces, p. 190-193.
- 2010 : 150 Best Eco House Ideas, p. 412-419.
- 2014 : Sports : Portrait d'une métropole, p. 115-119.
- 2015 : One building, how many lives ?, p. 94-95.
- 2015 : Lille respire - Concours Bas Carbone 2015

== Awards ==
- 2008 : AJAP Award (Albums des jeunes architectes et paysagistes), presented by the Culture and Communication Ministry.
