= Alinah Kelo Segobye =

Social development activist and archaeologist

- Born: Botswana
- Occupations: Archaeologist, academic, social development activist
- Organization: Namibia University of Science and Technology
- Known for: African archaeology and social development
- Title: Dean of Human Sciences
- Board member of: African Comprehensive HIV/AIDS Partnerships (ACHAP)
- Awards: Fellow of the African Academy of Sciences (2018)

Academic background
- Education: MA,University of Botswana PhD in Archaeology, University of Cambridge, 1994
- Thesis: (1994)

Academic work
- Discipline: Archaeology
- Sub-discipline: African archaeology
- Institutions: University of Botswana; Human Sciences Research Council; Namibia University of Science and Technology

Alinah Kelo Segobye is a social development activist and archaeologist, with specialisms in social development and HIV/AIDS and the future of studying the past in Africa and African archaeology. She is Dean of Human Sciences at the Namibia University of Science and Technology and an elected fellow of the African Academy of Sciences.

== Education ==
Segobye completed her undergraduate and MA studies at the University of Botswana, and graduated from the University of Cambridge with a PhD in Archaeology in 1994.

== Career ==
Segobye worked as Deputy Executive Director at the Human Sciences Research Council of South Africa. She then worked at the University of Botswana before entering her current role as Dean of Human Sciences at the Namibia University of Science and Technology. She was President of the PanAfrican Archaeological Association from 2005 to 2010.

== Recognition ==
Segobye is an elected fellow of the African Academy of Sciences (2018) and an honorary professor at the Thabo Mbeki African Leadership Institute (TMALI), University of South Africa. She serves on the board of the African Comprehensive HIV/AIDS Partnerships (ACHAP).

She was invited to address the second UNESCO Future Forum Africa in 2013. She was a visiting scholar at the Bradford Rotary Peace Centre (2016).
