= Freda Nkirote =

Kenyan archaeologist

- Born: Freda Nkirote M’Mbogori; 1967 (age 58–59)
- Education: University of Nairobi; University of Bergen; University of Paris; University College London
- Occupation: Archaeologist
- Known for: Director of the British Institute in Eastern Africa; President of the Pan-African Archaeological Association
- Scientific career
- Fields: Archaeology, cultural heritage

Freda Nkirote M’Mbogori is a Kenyan archaeologist, Previously a Director of the British Institute in Eastern Africa (BIEA) and a President of the Pan-African Archaeological Association.

== Biography ==
Nkirote studied for her BA at the University of Nairobi, for her MA at the University of Bergen and for her PhD at the University of Paris. She also holds a PG Diploma in Museum Studies from University College London, and a Field Research qualification from the University of Harvard. She is project lead, alongside Paul Lane, for the 'Well Being' project, funded by the British Academy, which is an academic research project working with pastoralist community organisations in Kenya and southern Ethiopia to understand historic water management practices. She was previously funded by the Wenner-Gren Foundation to research Bantu migration in the Mbeere region. She was also a project lead for the 'Rising from the Depths' scheme, where she investigated the role of women in maritime heritage preservation on the Kenyan coast. She has called for a change in angle on debates around cultural repatriation, arguing that the "tangible economic benefits" that countries whose cultural heritage is held overseas would gain from repatriation is equally significant to the "intangible negative effects" of loss of identity.

Nkirote joined the British Institute in Eastern Africa (BIEA) in 2015 as Assistant Director. In 2018 she was promoted to Director and is the first African to hold the role. Prior to her role at BIEA, she was Head of Cultural Heritage at National Museums of Kenya (NMK). In 2016 she curated the exhibition 'Pots and Identities' in the Creativity Gallery at NMK. In 2013, she held a British Museum International Training Programme Fellowship.

In 2018, she was elected President of the Pan-African Archaeological Association.

== Selected publications ==
- Nkirote, M'Mbogori Freda. "Population and ceramic traditions: revisiting the Tana ware of coastal Kenya (7th–14th century AD)." Azania: Archaeological Research in Africa 47.2 (2012): 245-246.
- Davies, Matthew IJ, and Freda Nkirote M'Mbogori, eds. Humans and the environment: new archaeological perspectives for the twenty-first century. OUP Oxford, 2013.
- Nkirote, M'Mbogori, Mercy Gakii Kinyua, and Ochieng Nyamanga. "Pottery chaine operatoire among the Mbeere People of Mt. Kenya Region: Continuity and change." (2020).
