= Justin Smith-Ruiu =

American philosopher

- Born: Justin Erik Halldór Smith; July 30, 1972 (age 54); Reno, Nevada, US

Academic background
- Education: University of California, Davis; Columbia University

Academic work
- Discipline: Philosophy
- Sub-discipline: Philosophy of science
- Institutions: Miami University; Concordia University; University of Paris
- Website: www.the-hinternet.com

Justin Smith-Ruiu (formerly Justin E. H. Smith) (born July 30, 1972, in Reno, Nevada) is an American-Canadian professor of history and philosophy of science at the Université Paris Cité. His primary research interests include Leibniz, post-structuralism, early modern philosophy, history and philosophy of biology, classical Indian philosophy, the history and philosophy of anthropology.

Smith-Ruiu is the author of several books and is also a contributor to The New York Times, Harper's Magazine, n+1, Slate, and Art in America.

Smith-Ruiu is an editor-at-large of Cabinet Magazine.

Since the fall of 2020, he has been publishing philosophical and critical essays in his online newsletter, Justin Smith-Ruiu's Hinternet.

The main-belt asteroid 13585 Justinsmith is named after Smith-Ruiu.

== Background and education ==
- 2023 Visiting professor of philosophy, Princeton University
- 2019–20 John and Constance Birkelund Fellow, Cullman Center for Scholars and Writers, New York Public Library
- 2016–17 Émile Francqui Chair, Université Libre de Bruxelles, Belgium.
- 2011 Visiting scholar in the School of Historical Studies at the Institute for Advanced Study, Princeton
- 2007–08 Humboldt Foundation Research Fellow, Institut für Philosophie, Humboldt University of Berlin
- 2000 PhD in philosophy from Columbia University
- 1997–98 Doctoral Research on a DAAD Fellowship University of Münster
- 1994 BA with honors in philosophy and Russian at University of California, Davis

== Bibliography ==
- Smith, Justin E. H. (March 22, 2022). The Internet Is Not What You Think It Is: A History, A Philosophy, A Warning. Princeton, NJ: Princeton University Press. ISBN 978-0-691-21232-6. Excerpted in Wired magazine.
- Smith, Justin E. H. (April 2, 2019). Irrationality: A History of the Dark Side of Reason. Princeton, New Jersey: Princeton University Press. doi:10.1515/9780691189666. ISBN 978-0-691-17867-7. JSTOR j.ctvc774xd. OCLC 1051133820.
- Smith, Justin E. H. (May 3, 2016). The philosopher: A history in six types. Princeton, New Jersey: Princeton University Press. doi:10.1515/9781400880577. ISBN 978-0-691-16327-7. JSTOR j.ctvc779bf. OCLC 939909039. Project MUSE book 64544.
- Nature, Human Nature, and Human Difference: Race in Early Modern Philosophy, Princeton University Press (June 30, 2015) ISBN 0691153647
- Divine Machines: Leibniz and the Sciences of Life, Princeton University Press (May 1, 2011) ISBN 0691141789
- The Life Sciences in Early Modern Philosophy (ed., with Ohad Nachtomy), Oxford University Press (January 6, 2014) ISBN 0199987319
- The Problem of Animal Generation in Early Modern Philosophy (ed.), Cambridge University Press (May 22, 2006) ISBN 0521840775
