= Sorbonne Paris Cité Alliance =

University alliance

Sorbonne Paris Cité Alliance (Alliance Sorbonne Paris Cité) is a university alliance since 2019 and a former association of universities and higher education institutions (ComUE) for institutions of higher education and research in the city of Paris and the French department of Seine-Saint-Denis.

The university was organized as a ComUE according to the 2013 Law on Higher Education and Research (France), effective December 30, 2014. The ComUE succeeded a similar association that had previously been effect for a few years as a Pôle de recherche et d'enseignement supérieur (PRES) with the same name, "Sorbonne Paris Cité" .

== Members ==
Sorbonne Paris Cité brings together the following institutions:

- Paris Cité University
- University of Sorbonne Paris-Nord
- École des hautes études en santé publique (EHESP)
- Sciences Po
- Institut national des langues et civilisations orientales (Langues O)
- Institut de Physique du Globe de Paris
- Centre national de la recherche scientifique (CNRS)
- Institut national d'études démographiques (INED)
- Institut national de recherche en informatique et en automatique (INRIA)
- Institut national de la santé et de la recherche médicale (INSERM)
- Institut de recherche pour le développement (IRED)
