= PanAfrican Archaeological Association =

Professional organization

- Formation: pre-1947
- Founder: Louis Leakey
- President: Freda Nkirote
- Website: www.panafprehistory.org/en/

The PanAfrican Archaeological Association (PAA) is a pan-African professional organisation for archaeologists, geologists and palaeoanthropologists.

== History ==
The association was founded by Louis Leakey and its first congress was held in Nairobi in January 1947. At the event, Abbé Henri Breuil was elected as the association's first president, and Robert Broom, as vice-president; a constitution was adopted. Three sub-committees were created at the event: geology and climatology, prehistoric archaeology and human palaeontology. Perhaps the most significant action taken at the first congress was the rejection of European geological periods for Africa and the adoption of continent-wide and continent-specific nomenclature.

At the 1963 congress in Tenerife, it was decided to begin publishing a systematic inventory of diagnostic archaeological assemblages from Africa, under the title of Inventaria Archaeologica Africana, following the example of the Inventaria Archaeologica series published by the International Union of Prehistoric and Protohistoric Sciences.

In 1977 a new constitution was adopted, in order to better reflect the need for the PAA to be constituted by African-born scholars and to reflect their needs.

At the 1983 congress, held at Jos in Nigeria, the PAA passed a resolution condemning apartheid in South Africa and called for a cessation of ties to South African institutions. The resolutions were proposed by John Onyango-Abuje, and seconded by P Sinclair and David Kiyaga-Mulindwa. According to Caleb Folorunso, some non-African attendees opposed the resolutions, citing their opinion that archaeology was concerned with "science not politics".

Two conferences have been hosted in partnership with the Society of Africanist Archaeologists: at University Cheikh Anta Diop (UCAD) in Dakar in 2010 and at the University of Witwatersrand in 2014.

== Presidents ==
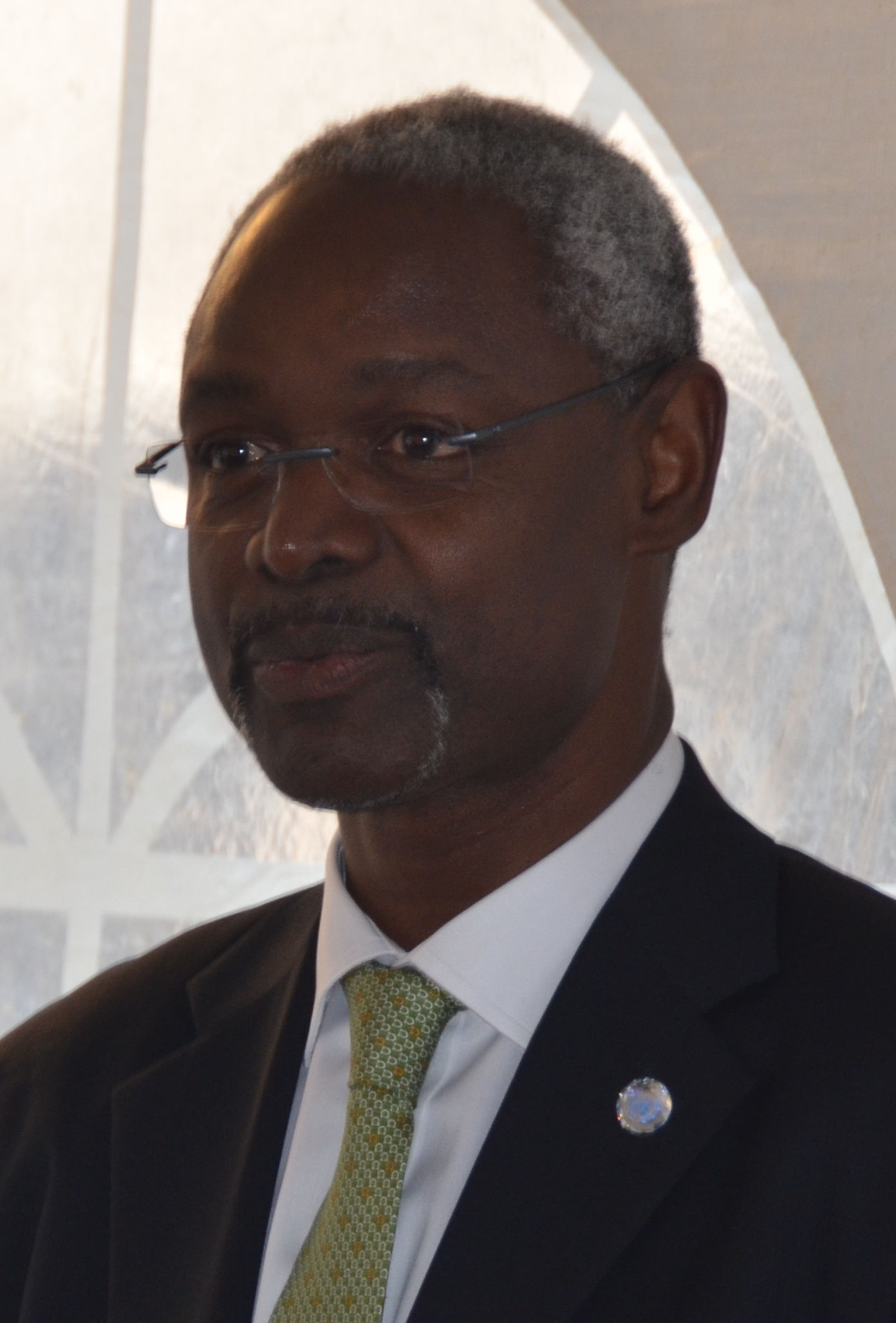
Ibrahim Thiaw, 2016.

- Abbé Henri Breuil (1947–1955)
- Louis Leakey (1955–1959)
- Camille Arambourg (1959–1963)
- Luis Pericot Garcia (1963–1967)
- Amadou Mahtar M'Bow (1967–1971)
- Thurston Shaw (1971–1977)
- Bethwell Ogot (1977–1983)
- Ekpo Eyo (1983–1995)
- David Kiyaga-Mulindwa (1995–2001)
- Hamady Bocoum (2001–2005)
- Alinah Segobye (2005–2010)
- Benjamin Smith (2010–2014)
- Ibrahima Thiaw (2014–2018)
- Freda Nkirote (2018–present)
