= University Alliance (disambiguation) =

University Alliance may refer to:

- University Alliance - an association of British universities
- University Alliance (US) - a group of US universities offering online education
- University Alliance of the Silk Road - a group of institutions in China
