= Thierry Morand =

French entrepreneur (born 1960)

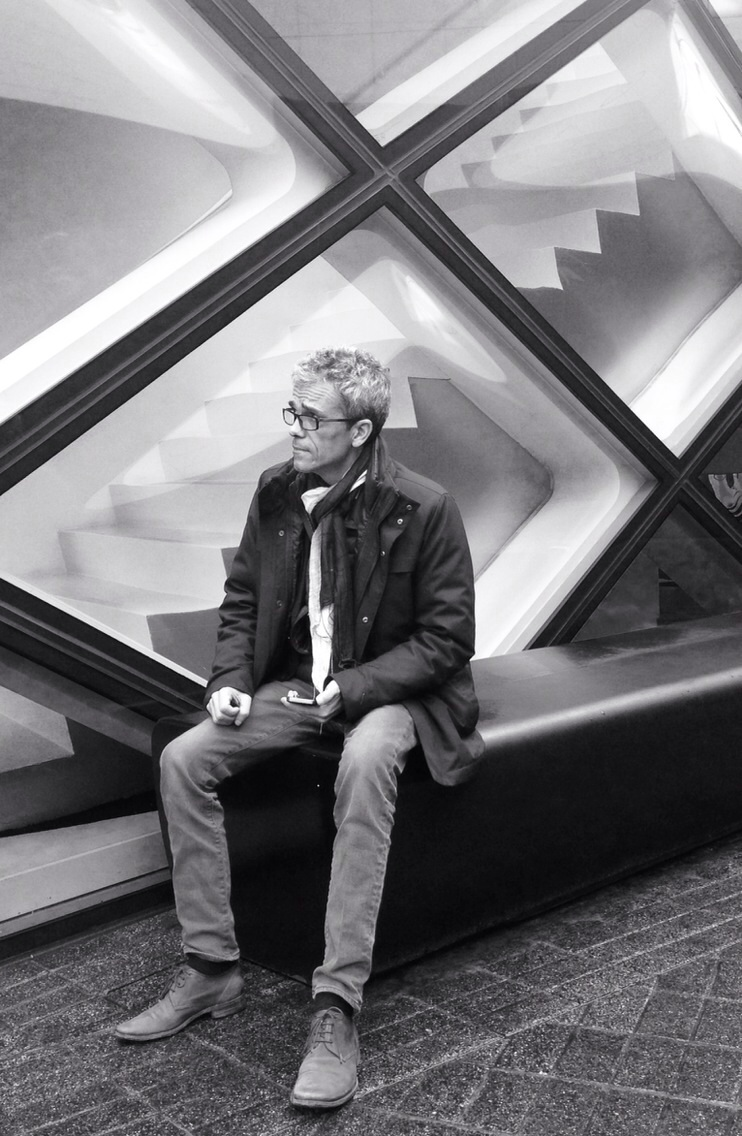
- Born: Thierry Jean-Louis Morand; May 24, 1960 (age 66); Paris, France
- Occupation: CEO of GOPURA asia
- Years active: 1982 - today

Thierry Morand (born May 24, 1960) is a French entrepreneur and expert in the containment engineering field. He is known for having designed and created unique laboratories and controlled atmosphere areas for more than 30 years, in France and abroad, including four biosafety level 4 laboratories (BSL4). Morand has also improved the equipment and construction standards. His company, Clima plus, designs and manages laboratories projects.
