= Claude Allègre =

French politician and geochemist (1937–2025)

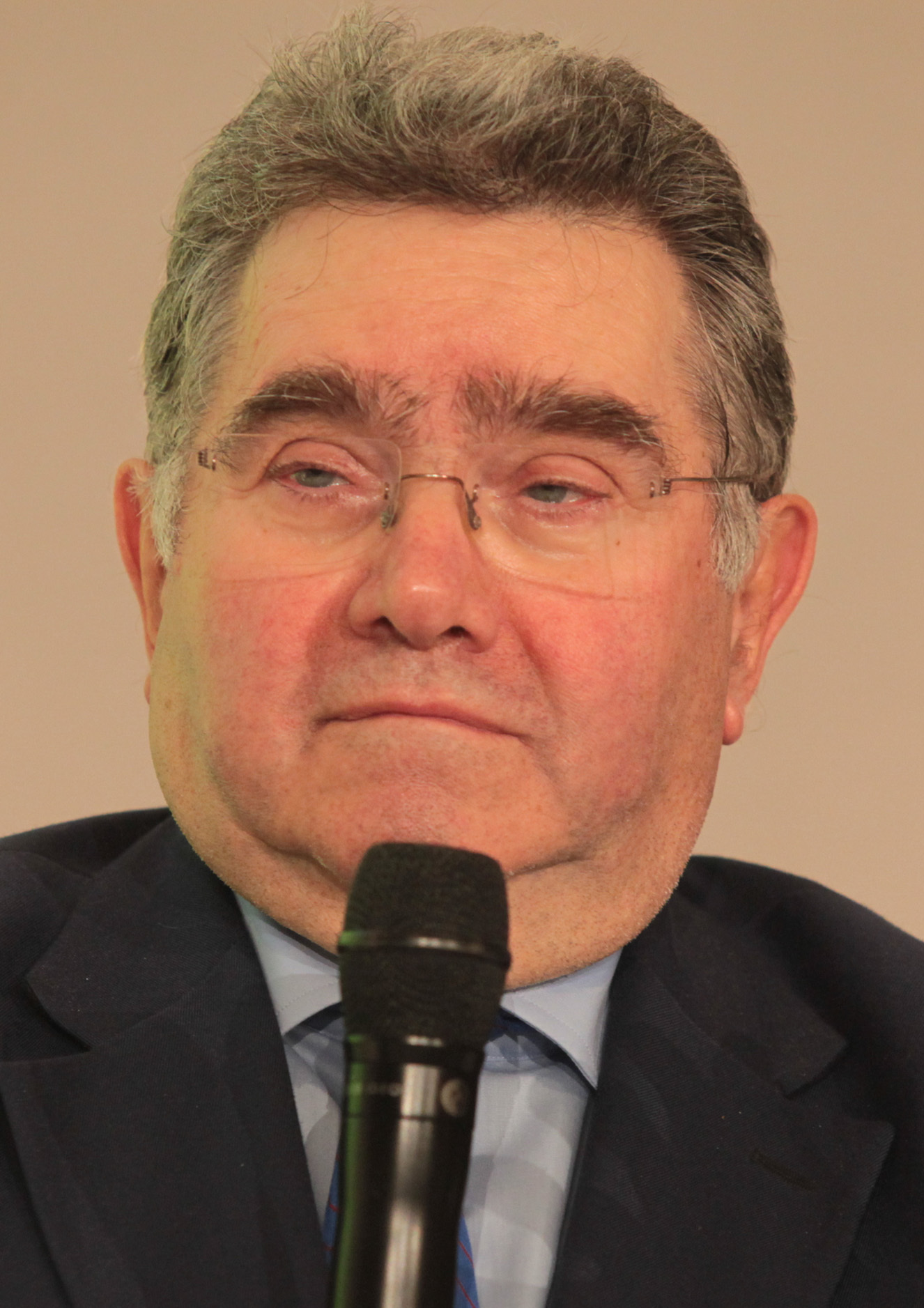
- Allègre in 2009

Minister of National Education
- In office 4 June 1997 – 28 March 2000
- President: Jacques Chirac
- Prime Minister: Lionel Jospin
- Preceded by: François Bayrou
- Succeeded by: Jack Lang

Personal details
- Born: Claude Jean Allègre; 31 March 1937 Paris, France
- Died: 4 January 2025 (aged 87) Paris, France
- Party: PS (1973–2008)
- Education: Lycée Charlemagne

Claude Jean Allègre (French: [klod alɛɡʁ]; 31 March 1937 – 4 January 2025) was a French politician and scientist. His work in the field of isotope geochemistry was recognised with the award of many senior medals, including the Crafoord Prize for geosciences in 1986 and the William Bowie Medal of the American Geophysical Union in 1995. His political service included a three-year term as Minister of Education in France, from 1997 to 2000.

== Early life ==
Allègre was born in Paris on 31 March 1937, and was the eldest of four children. His father was a professor of natural sciences, and his mother was a school headteacher. Allègre's family was from the Hérault region of France.

== Background and scientific work ==
Allègre's main area of research was in geochemistry. He started work in this field for his doctoral research, where he focussed on ways of dating rocks using isotope geochemistry; specifically radiometric dating. After realising that there was no laboratory in France where he could make measurements with the accuracy he was seeking, Allègre received a NATO grant and spent the summer of 1965 working at the California Institute of Technology in Pasadena, California. Here, Allègre began working with Jerry Wasserburg, and learned the techniques required for rubidium-strontium dating of rocks by mass spectrometry. Allègre returned to France, and over the next three years built a laboratory and began making isotopic measurements. He completed his doctoral thesis, titled 'introduction to the systematic geochronology of open systems', at the University of Paris in 1967. In 1968, he took up a position at the Institut de Physique du Globe de Paris (IPGP), where he then spent much of his scientific career, including a ten year stint as IPGP director from 1976 to 1986.

Over the next thirty years, Allègre and his research students, post-doctoral researchers and collaborators developed techniques that meant they were able to measure isotope abundances in rocks and minerals by mass spectrometry that set new standards of sensitivity and precision. This allowed Allègre and his team to develop new ideas about the age and chemical evolution of the outer parts of the Earth, and also provide new information and insight into the early history of the Solar System, by dating meteorites. Allègre defined the new field of 'chemical geodynamics'. This combined data from isotope geochemistry with constraints from geophysics to develop ideas about the long-term chemical evolution of the planet, from core-formation to crustal growth.

Allègre's work had a substantial impact on the field of geochemistry, for which he received a number of awards and elections to national academies, including the US National Academy of Sciences in 1985, and the Royal Society in 2002. He was also awarded senior medals for his work, from the Geochemical Society (V.M. Goldschmidt award, 1986) and the American Geophysical Union (Bowie medal, in 1995). In 1986, he was jointly awarded the Crafoord Prize with Wasserburg, in recognition of their 'pioneering work in isotope geology'.

=== Scientific administration ===
Allègre made many contributions to the organisation of the geological and geochemical sciences in France and Europe throughout his career. In 1981, he became the first president of the European Union of Geosciences (EUG), which was established to coordinate a biennial scientific congress for geoscientists across Europe. The EUG later merged with the European Geophysical Union, to become the European Geosciences Union (EGU), in 2004. In 1988, Allègre created the European Association of Geochemistry and presided over an inaugural international conference on geochemistry in Paris. This led to the establishment of the annual 'Goldschmidt Conferences' of the international geochemistry community, in cooperation with the Geochemical Society which are held in alternate years in Europe, and in the United States. From 1992 to 1997, Allègre was director of the French national geological survey, the Bureau de Recherches Géologiques et Minières.

In 2004, Allègre was presented with the distinguished service award of the Geochemical Society for his 'enormous' service to the geochemical profession. In his citation, Al Hofmann commented that Allègre's 'actions have not always been popular ... but they have always been guided by far-sighted strategic thinking and planning, and usually by deep insight.' He also characterised Allègre's approach to service as one that involved 'hatching a far-flung idea ... hand picking a few people ... and then letting them do the work.'

=== Scientific works ===
Over the course of his career, Allègre published many scientific papers. He also authored a number of scientific monographs and textbooks, including:

- Introduction to geochemistry (1974)
- Trace elements in igneous petrology : a volume in memory of Paul W. Gast (1978)
- From stone to star : a view of modern geology (1992)
- Isotope geology (2008)

Allègre also wrote a number of popular science texts, on topics such as the history of the Earth and the plate tectonic revolution. His 1988 book, The behaviour of the Earth, gained praise from reviewers for presenting a perspective on the French scientific contributions to the history of plate tectonics. Historian of geology, David Leveson, cautioned that the narrative promoted a 'Whiggish' telling of the story of plate tectonics as one of progress, from the viewpoint of an insider. While Allègre's account of the new global geology of plate tectonics was 'lyrical' and 'rhapsodic', Leveson argued that Allègre's focus on progress meant that he was not able to successfully place 'mobilist geology in its "proper" sociological context' in this book.

== Scientific controversies ==
In 1976, Allègre and volcanologist Haroun Tazieff became involved in an intense and public quarrel about whether inhabitants should evacuate the areas surrounding the la Soufrière volcano on the Caribbean island of Guadeloupe, which had begun to show signs of unrest, including steam explosions. Allègre held that inhabitants should be evacuated, while Tazieff held that the Soufrière was harmless because all analyses pointed to a purely phreatic eruption with no sign of fresh magma. In part out of caution, the authorities decided to follow Allègre's advice and evacuate. The eruptive crisis did not result in any damage, but the evacuation had very significant negative consequences. Allègre, as the director of Institut de Physique du Globe de Paris, subsequently expelled Tazieff from that institute. The controversy dragged on for many years after the end of the eruption, and ended up in court.

== Political career ==
A one time member of the French Socialist Party, Allègre is better known to the general public for his political responsibilities, which included serving as Minister of Education of France in the Jospin cabinet from 4 June 1997 to March 2000, when he was replaced by Jack Lang. His outpourings of critiques against teaching personnel, as well as his reforms, made him increasingly unpopular in the teaching world. In 1996, Allegre published La Défaite de Platon ("The defeat of Plato"), described by mathematician Pierre Schapira in the Spring 1997 edition of Mathematical Intelligencer as "one of the most savage broadsides against conceptual thought."

In the run-up to the 2007 French presidential election, he endorsed Lionel Jospin, then Dominique Strauss-Kahn, for the Socialist nomination, and finally sided with the ex-Socialist Jean-Pierre Chevènement, against Ségolène Royal. When Chevènement decided not to run, he publicly declined to support Royal's bid for the presidency, citing differences over nuclear energy, GMOs and stem-cell research. He later became close to conservative president Nicolas Sarkozy.

== Views on global warming ==
In an article in 2006 entitled "The Snows of Kilimanjaro" in L'Express, a French weekly, Allègre cited evidence that Antarctica's gaining ice and that Mount Kilimanjaro's retreating snow caps, among other global-warming concerns, might be due to natural causes. He said that "[t]he cause of this climate change is unknown". This represented a change of mind, since Allègre wrote in 1987 that "By burning fossil fuels, man increased the concentration of carbon dioxide in the atmosphere which, for example, has raised the global mean temperature by half a degree in the last century".

Allègre accused those agreeing with the mainstream scientific view of global warming of being motivated by money, saying that "the ecology of helpless protesting has become a very lucrative business for some people!"

In 2009, when it was suggested that Claude Allègre might be offered a position as minister in President Nicolas Sarkozy's government, TV presenter and environmental activist Nicolas Hulot stated:

"He doesn't think the same as the 2,500 scientists of the IPCC, who are warning the world about a disaster; that's his right. But if he were to be recruited in government, it would become policy, and it would be a bras d'honneur to those scientists. [...] [It] would be a tragic signal, six months before the Copenhagen Conference, and something incomprehensible coming from France, which has been a leading country for years in the fight against climate change!"

In a 2010 petition, more than 500 French researchers asked Science Minister Valérie Pécresse to dismiss Allègre's book L'imposture climatique, claiming the book was "full of factual mistakes, distortions of data, and plain lies". Allègre described the petition as "useless and stupid".

== Later life and death ==
Allègre suffered a heart attack while at a scientific conference in Chile in 2013. He was hospitalised, but survived. He died in Paris on 4 January 2025, at the age of 87.

== Awards and honors ==
- Foreign Associate of the National Academy of Sciences (1985)
- V. M. Goldschmidt Award, (1986)
- Crafoord Prize for geology along with Gerald J. Wasserburg, (1986)
- Foreign Honorary Member of the American Academy of Arts and Sciences, (1987)
- Wollaston Medal of the Geological Society of London, (1987)
- Member of the American Philosophical Society (1992)
- Gold Medal of the CNRS, (1994)
- French Academy of Sciences, (1995)
- William Bowie Medal, American Geophysical Union (1995)
- Arthur Holmes Medal, European Geosciences Union (1995)
- Honorary Doctorate, Université Libre de Bruxelles (1998)
- Foreign Member, Royal Society (2002)
- Atoms for Peace prize (2011)

=== National honours ===
- Commander, Legion of Honour (2000)
- Commander, Ordre des Palmes académiques (2000)

== See also ==
- Politics of France

== Sources ==
- Allègre, Claude J.; Michard, G. (31 December 1974). Introduction to Geochemistry. Dordrecht: Springer. ISBN 978-90-277-0497-9.

Political offices
Preceded by François Bayrou	Minister of Education; 1997–2000	Succeeded by Jack Lang
