= Institut de Physique du Globe de Paris =

Research institute

Coordinates: 48.8473°N 2.3568°E

The Institut de Physique du Globe de Paris (French pronunciation: [ɛ̃stity də fizik dy ɡlɔb də paʁi], lit. 'Paris Institute of Earth Physics'; abbr. IPGP) is a French governmental, non-profit research and higher education establishment located in Paris, dedicated to the study of earth and planetary sciences by combining observations, laboratory analysis and construction of conceptual analogical and numerical models.

IPGP is part of CNRS (UMR 7154) and University Paris-Diderot. It is the second largest CNRS research unit in France. The institute has 6 observatories. IPGP is also in charge by the French government of monitoring the active volcanoes on French territories in addition to the management of the worldwide network of seismological stations GEOSCOPE, and a major contribution to the worldwide network of magnetic observatories Intermagnet. IPGP maintains permanent volcanologic observatories on the islands of Réunion (Piton de la Fournaise), Guadeloupe (La Soufrière), and Martinique (Mount Pelée). The institute also maintains several analytical facilities in applied geophysics as well as a park of a variety of geophysical instruments.

IPGP maintains three campuses in the Paris area. Until 2010, its main headquarters location is inside the Jussieu Campus in the 5th arrondissement of Paris. After 2010, it moved into a state of the art dedicated facility adjacent to the Jussieu Campus, in front of the Jardin des Plantes. IPGP has a second campus located in Paris-Diderot University in the 13th arrondissement of Paris where the geodesy and space sciences research, and undergrad teaching are done. The third campus is located 6 km to the east of Paris where it conducts space and planetary science activities ranging from building geophysical space instruments and sensors to planetary data analysis. IPGP maintain a staff of nearly 500 persons.

The lead investigator (P.I.) for the seismometer instrument on the international space mission to Mars, InSight (launched 2018) is from this institute. Seismic Experiment for Interior Structure (SEIS) is a seismometer intended to operate on the surface of the planet Mars, hopefully increasing understanding of that planet and in turn the Solar System and Earth interiors.

== See also ==
- Grands établissements
