= DGS =

DGS may refer to:

== Medicine ==
- Death-grip syndrome, a persistent erection due to lack of penile sensitivity
- DiGeorge syndrome, a syndrome caused by the deletion of a small piece of chromosome 22

== Schools ==
- Dartford Grammar School, Kent, England
- Derby Grammar School, Derby, England
- Diocesan Girls' School, Hong Kong
- Downers Grove South, an American high school
- Didcot Girls' School, Oxfordshire, England

== Businesses and organizations ==
- DAL Global Services, a Delta Air Lines subsidiary
- Davis Graham & Stubbs, an American law firm
- Deutscher Gehörlosen-Sportverband, German Deaf Sports Association
- Dirección General de Seguridad, a police department in Francoist Spain located in the Royal House of the Post Office, Madrid
- Direcção Geral de Segurança, the pre-1974 Portuguese Secret Police, known prior to 1969 as the PIDE
- Direction générale de la Santé, a Directorate-General of the French Ministry of Health
- Directorate-General of Health, commonly known as Direção-Geral da Saúde (DGS)
- District Grocery Stores, a grocery store cooperative in the Washington, D.C., area
- German Society for Sociology (German: Deutsche Gesellschaft für Soziologie)

== Other uses ==
- Dai Gyakuten Saiban, the Japanese name of the 2015 game The Great Ace Attorney: Adventures
- Deposit-guarantee scheme, a scheme for deposit insurance
- Dragon Go server, an internet server for the board game Go
- German Sign Language (German: Deutsche Gebärdensprache)
- Vertical Transfer Exam(Turkish: Dikey Geçiş Sınavı), is an exam administered by ÖSYM in Turkey for associate degree graduates to enter undergraduate programs related to the department they graduated from.

== People with the name ==
- D. G. S. Dhinakaran (1935–2008), Indian Christian evangelist

== See also ==
- Department of General Services (disambiguation), various American local agencies
