= Mais qui? =

French antisemitic slogan

Qui? or Mais qui? ("Who?" or "But who?") is an antisemitic French Internet meme which appeared in 2021 and was later used as a slogan on placards at demonstrations in France. One of the first "Mais qui" placards was held up at an August 2021 demonstration in Metz by Cassandre Fristot, who was later convicted of incitement to racial hatred and received a six-month suspended sentence. (In France, incitement to hatred is punishable by law.) After this, other placards appeared at demonstrations: "Mais qui? Je suis Cassandre". The far-right movement Civitas invited demonstrators to march with "Mais qui" placards. The meme was widely used worldwide on discussion forums hosting politically incorrect content, such as 4chan.

== Origins ==
Marc Knobel, a specialist in Internet racist and antisemitic propaganda, notes that "things started well before the appearance of the slogan 'Qui?', a classic strategy of the far right to designate a scapegoat without naming him or her head-on ... From the beginning of the pandemic, there was some trash talk on certain platforms targeting Agnès Buzyn ..., Yves Levy, or ... Jérôme Salomon. Then these accusations were extended to Jews as a whole".

The first occurrence of Qui? with antisemitic undertones was on 18 June 2021, during an interview on the French television channel CNews. Retired General Dominique Delawarde (signatory of the controversial tribune des généraux in the far-right newspaper Valeurs actuelles) referred to a minority which controlled the "media hordes". To make this more explicit, the columnist Claude Posternak (a member of La République en marche and president of the polling agency La Matrice) insisted on asking for greater clarity: "Who? But say who?" Delawarde replied, "The community that you know well". Host Jean-Marc Morandini then interrupted the interview. Shortly afterwards, the Paris public prosecutor's office opened an investigation of Delawarde for "public defamation and incitement to hatred and violence on the grounds of origin or belonging to an ethnic group, nation, race or religion". In November 2020, Delawarde had mentioned in a blog "the hypothesis of major fraud" in the American presidential election, "the Western 'media pack', which we know who controls it".

== Meaning and development ==
=== Meaning ===
French commentators offered interpretations of the phrase. According to political scientist and Conspiracy Watch director Rudy Reichstadt, Mais qui? is antisemitic language trying to dodge "quite clumsily, the reproach of antisemitism". Reichstadt said that since the end of 2018 and the yellow vests protests, accusations of conspiracy have become commonplace on the web and take the form of antisemitic slogans which denounce a "dictatorship" that would prevail under a "totalitarian regime" in France.

Dominique Sopo, President of SOS Racisme, said that "there is no doubt about the meaning of this placard". According to Sopo, "The question ... is a falsely-coded question that refers to the accusation that the Jews are an evil community and the cause of all our ills", and he sees this as an attempt by the far right to lead a new protest movement. Lawyer Patrick Klugman said that Mais qui? becomes a rallying sign for people who want to target the Jewish community as an overpowering community whose interests are hidden and different from the rest of society".

According to sociologist Michel Wieviorka, this "seemingly innocent pronoun that actually targets 'the Jews' ... accuses them of benefiting from the health crisis". For historian Marc Knobel, "The message, stigmatizing, is simple. Who are the ones responsible for the pandemic, and who would benefit from all this? The Jews".

Political scientist Jean-Yves Camus identified the subtext of the question: "Who is trying to make people believe that a pandemic exists and to take advantage of this 'lie' to enact exceptional health measures in terms of public freedoms?" Mais qui? "suggests a malicious intent born in the brain of a group of individuals who are considered to hold such power that together they would pursue a hidden plan of domination, in which the so-called 'health pass' would be only one step towards a dictatorial world government". The formulation of the question without naming the Jews also implies that it would be forbidden to do so (Reichstadt noted that Raphaël Confiant, in defense of Dieudonné, described the Jews as "unspeakable" in 2006), and "this taboo exists only in the paranoid worldview of antisemites".

=== Spread ===
Mais qui? became an Internet meme, notably on the French video-game forum Jeuxvideo.com and internationally on 4chan. It also found root among antisemitic groups such as the neo-Nazi website The Daily Stormer, supporters of Alain Soral and Dieudonné, and activists who focused on the COVID-19 pandemic. The antisemitic website Jesuispartout.com, (Note: The website Jesuispartout.com (I'm everywhere.com) takes the name of the French collaborationist and anti-Semitic weekly newspaper Je suis partout, which was published from 1930 to 1944. Its editor, Robert Brasillach, was executed after the liberation in 1945 for collaborating with the enemy.) was created in 2020 with an associated Telegram channel which positioned Jewish (or supposedly-Jewish) personalities on an interactive map; Interior Minister Gérald Darmanin announced on Twitter that he would take the website to court, calling it "deeply scandalous and nauseating". Its founder, Samuel Goujon, was indicted on 21 August 2021.

A few weeks after the interview with Delawarde, several anti-sanitary-pass demonstrators marched with placards reading "Mais qui?". They were especially visible at rallies organized by Florian Philippot on 17, 24 and 31 July, along with yellow stars and references to the Vichy regime and Nazism, in what Michel Wievioka called an "absolute contradiction". Historian Emmanuel Debono said, "With all these references, we have an illustration of the specificity of antisemitism". explains the h. Interviewed for a far-right YouTube channel, several demonstrators carrying the signs voiced antisemitic tropes about "well-poisoners" and "greed".

On 7 August 2021, the slogan was used on a sign at a demonstration against health passes in Metz. The sign asked the question in red and answered with thirteen names of families or individuals in black (Note: The names were, from top to bottom and left to right: Rothschild, Fabius, Attali, Buzyn, Attal, Véran, BFM Drahi, Macron, Salomon, Soros, K. Schwab, B.H.L., and Ferguson.) who were allegedly Jewish or "accomplices of the Jews": politicians, intellectuals or economists, some of whom were unconnected with the pandemic or vaccine policy, but many of whom were real (or supposed) members of the Jewish community. The names (including Rothschild, B.H.L., Attali, Soros and Drahi) are "recurrent targets of antisemitic propaganda for years - and, in the case of the Rothschilds, since the 19th century", and were labeled "traitors" in white (Note: Reichstadt said that "antisemitism considers the Jews as members of a vast conspiracy, i.e. as congenital traitors, precisely. This is undoubtedly a legacy of Christian anti-Judaism, which made Judas the 'traitor' par excellence.") in white. The letter Q (from "Qui?") is surmounted by black, demonising horns, "emblematic of anti-Jewish passion".

The person holding up the placard, Cassandre Fristot, is a part-time German teacher in Moselle and was a member of the Front National, briefly head of Louis Aliot's cabinet, a candidate in the 2020 municipal elections, and close to the Party of France. Fristot was arrested two days later and suspended from her duties pending "disciplinary action". On 10 August, the Metz public prosecutor announced a trial for "public incitement to racial hatred" scheduled for 8 September. During her hearings in police custody, Fristot said that she did not understand what she was accused of doing; she said that she had been inspired by a model on the Internet to denounce the government's health pass through "the powerful, and not to undermine a community". About the flag she held in her other hand, which read "Sacred heart of Jesus, hope and salvation of France", she said: "Despite the fleur-de-lis, even if it may allude to a royalist flag, it is above all a message of peace." Fristot was defended by Paul Yon, former lawyer for Holocaust denier Robert Faurisson, and François Wagner. She was tried by the Metz criminal court on 8 September 2021, and did not appear at the hearing. The prosecutor requested a three-month suspended prison sentence, Fristot's lawyers pleaded for acquittal; the court reserved judgment until 20 October 2021. Cassandre Fristot was sentenced by the Metz Criminal Court to a six-month suspended sentence and ordered to pay sums ranging from €1 to €300 to anti-racist associations. After seeing the sign in Metz, journalist Éric Naulleau wrote that through this "casual antisemitism in which nothing is missing, [...] in the name of the fight against the health pass; ... the foul beast knows how to vary the masks".

On 14 and 20 August, demonstrations in French cities against the health pass continued to be peppered with provocative slogans, comparisons with Nazi horrors and signs of antisemitism and support for Fristot (including more "Qui?" signs with pictures of Jacques Attali and Claude Posternak or lists of names). Eloi Fauvergue, who had displayed on his torso "Qui?" with the "Q" topped with horns and carried a royalist flag during a 14 August demonstration in Compiègne, was sentenced in January 2022 to a three-month suspended sentence by the criminal court for "public provocation to hatred or violence" towards the Jewish community. Fauvergue said, "My aim was to support Cassandre Fristot for her courage to demonstrate. There was no interpretation. I was supporting freedom of expression. I found it beautiful and original to put horns on the Q of the "Who", but public prosecutor Marie-Céline Lawrysz noted "a perfidious racism that feeds on good feelings". Although the slogan's antisemitic character is unambiguous ("there is not much more antisemitic than this sign "), Reichstadt acknowledges some public ignorance; the sign, however, "provides, as in a game of Cluedo, a certain number of clues, leaving them to connect the dots by themselves ".

Essayist Tristan Mendès-France wrote that the marches "are suitcase demonstrations, organized behind vague terms, which allow communities that have nothing to do with each other to agglomerate"; "There is an extreme heterogeneity of social profiles, many people who have a whole series of grievances that accumulate".

Despite the reaction against antisemitism, other demonstrators saw the controversy as a way to divert attention and discredit their movement. For Reichstadt and others, it is about minimising or trivialising antisemitism.

=== Persistence and apathy ===
Dominique Sopo cites "the recurrent and assumed nature of things ... From now on, the sign bearers do not hide and there is an absence of reaction from other demonstrators. Now the sign bearers do not hide, and there is an absence of reaction from the other demonstrators". Yet the slogan "Who?" and its antisemitic meaning were widely publicised". Michel Wieviorka also notes this visibility, which is a novelty through this "resurgence of antisemitism": "In these anti-sanitary pass demonstrations, ... antisemitism is inserted in a way that is not complicated within the crowd itself and ... no one tries to distance themselves from it or to denounce it". Even if not all the demonstrators are antisemitic, this expression "finds its space ... and is not immediately, strongly rejected by all those around".

=== Simplification and fantasy ===
Sociologist Michel Wieviorka says that the antisemitism of the anti-sanitary pass demonstrations is "a little bit ... of the ultra-left" but mainly "that of the far right ... with an enormous historical depth", which is regularly found in historical contexts; "It resurrects, but its features evolve". "The health crisis - as is often the case in the history of crises - is a breeding ground for the expression of this antisemitism"; "... from the Middle Ages to the Covid, the Jews are traditional scapegoats ... they were accused of poisoning the wells ... This is the first time in a very long time that there was a need for scapegoats in our society ... In these demonstrations where conspiracy theories cloud the minds of some demonstrators, this archaic antisemitism resurfaces". In these demonstrations, where conspiracy theories cloud the minds of some demonstrators, this archaic antisemitism resurfaces. "The myth of the Jewish conspiracy, in particular, comes back regularly during pandemics because it offers a rational explanation for anguish" and its scapegoat "is regularly embodied in the figure of the Jew", says historian, political scientist and CNRS French National Centre for Scientific Research (CNRS) director of research Nonna Mayer.

According to historian Marc Knobel, "With its share of uncertainties and fears, the epidemic has also been instrumentalized for antisemitic purposes". For fellow historian Emmanuel Debono, "In moments of crisis, movements that bring together fairly heterogeneous fringes of the population such as the Yellow Vests, there is a focus, at one point or another, on the Jews". However, Wieviorka notes that the antisemitism of the Yellow Vests is that of "secondary episodes, on the fringes, rather distinct from the message carried by the movement as a whole".

For microbiologist, WHO member and professor emeritus Jean-Pierre Dedet, "the search for someone to blame has been a constant in civilisations faced with a health crisis"; these scapegoats were most often immigrants and Jews. "We can understand these archaic reflexes at a time when epidemics were plagues of mysterious origin ... Today, we know the causes and the processes. It is paradoxical, at a time when technology and communication are at their highest level, that people continue to react irrationally ... there is a lack of knowledge and scientific culture", and "the cacophony of the medical world" adds to misunderstanding. The focus on the Jews is "a reading that simplifies the functioning of a complex world whose ins and outs we do not necessarily understand...", says Debono, "as if Hitler's antisemitism, said to be over, had today given way to other victims (Yellow Vests, Muslims, non-vaccinated against Covid-19 ...) calling for a mobilization against a new persecution. The yellow star would have gone out of history and changed its chest ... the Jews are where we need them to be, even when they are not there". "The fantasy of Jewish omnipresence, which explains everything and its opposite, is difficult if not impossible to extinguish. It functions wonderfully, even in the absence of the Jews. In fact, it functions outside of reality".

== Attitudes ==
Wieviorka says that "without a clear refusal on the part of each demonstrator and of those who urge the crowd to express this type of hatred within the processions, it is to be feared that its presence will be reinforced". The sociologist concludes: "Under no circumstances should we have anything to do with this hatred, we should be surgical in the way we denounce it. I would even say that indifference on this issue is unacceptable" because it is neither anecdotal nor secondary.

At the beginning of September 2021, French Democratic Confederation of Labour (CFDT) Secretary General Laurent Berger described as "infrequent (...) all those who are far-right, who are conspiracy theorists, who are anti-Semites and who, in the end, use this argument to push their ideas". Berger did not want to be lumped in with demonstrators against the health pass.

== See also ==
- Dog whistle (politics) – Political messaging using coded language
- Timeline of antisemitism in the 21st century
