= Winfried =

Winfried is a masculine German given name. Notable people with the name include:

- Winfried Berkemeier (born 1953), former German footballer
- Winfried Bischoff (1941–2023), German-British businessperson
- Winfried Bönig (born 1959), German organist
- Winfried Brugger (1950–2010), German academic
- Winfried Denk (born 1957), German physicist and neurobiologist
- Winfried Glatzeder (born 1945), German television actor
- Winfried Hassemer (1940–2014), German criminal law scientist
- Winfried Klepsch (born 1956), retired West German long jumper
- Winfried Kretschmann (born 1948), German politician
- Winfried Michel (born 1948), German recorder player, composer, and editor of music
- Winfried Nachtwei (born 1946), German politician
- Winfried Schäfer (born 1950), German football manager and former player
- Winfried Otto Schumann (1888–1974), German physicist
- W. G. Sebald (1944–2001), German writer and academic (full name Winfried Georg Sebald)
- Winfried Wiencek (1949–2025), German deaf table tennis player and deaf sports official
- Winfried Zillig (1905–1963), German composer, music theorist, and conductor
- Saint Boniface (672–754), born Winfrid, Apostle of the Germans
