= COVID-19 pandemic in France =

- Disease: COVID-19
- Pathogen: SARS-CoV-2
- Location: France
- First outbreak: Wuhan, Hubei, China
- Index case: Bordeaux
- Arrival date: 24 January 2020 (6 years, 8 months, 1 week and 2 days)
- Confirmed cases: 39,061,500 (updated 18 September 2026)
- Deaths: 168,207 (updated 18 September 2026)
- Fatality rate: 0.43%
- Vaccinations: Updated 18 September 2026: 54,677,680 (total vaccinated); 53,192,480 (fully vaccinated); 158,060,080 (doses administered)

Government website
- Public Health France

The COVID-19 pandemic in France has resulted in 39,061,500 confirmed cases of COVID-19 and 168,207 deaths.

The virus was confirmed to have reached France on 24 January 2020, when the first COVID-19 case in both Europe and France was identified in Bordeaux. The first five confirmed cases were all individuals who had recently arrived from China. A Chinese tourist who was admitted to hospital in Paris on 28 January 2020, died on 14 February 2020, becoming the first known COVID-19 fatality outside Asia as well as the first in France. A key event in the spread of the disease across metropolitan France as well as its overseas territories was the annual assembly of the Christian Open Door Church between 17 and 24 February 2020 in Mulhouse which was attended by about 2,500 people, at least half of whom are believed to have contracted the virus. On 4 May 2020, retroactive testing of samples in one French hospital showed that a patient was probably already infected with the virus on 27 December 2019, almost a month before the first officially confirmed case.

The first lockdown period began on 17 March 2020 and ended on 11 May 2020. On 2 May 2020, Health Minister Olivier Véran announced that the government would seek to extend the health emergency period until 24 July 2020. Several mayors opposed the 11 May 2020 lifting of the lockdown, which had been announced by the president a few weeks earlier in a televised address to the nation, saying it was premature. Véran's bill was discussed in Senate on 4 May 2020.

From August 2020, there was an increase in the rate of infection and on 10 October 2020, France set a record number of new infections in a 24-hour period in Europe with 26,896 recorded. The increase caused France to enter a second nationwide lockdown on 28 October 2020. On 15 October 2020, police raided the homes and offices of key government officials, including Véran and Philippe, in a criminal negligence probe opened by the Cour de Justice de la République. According to a team of French epidemiologists, under 5% of the total population of France, or around 2.8 million people, may have been infected with COVID-19. This was believed to have been nearly twice as high in the Île-de-France and Alsace regions.

On 31 March 2021, Macron announced a third national lockdown which commenced on 3 April 2021 and which was mandated for all of April 2021; measures included the closure of non-essential shops, the suspension of school attendance, a ban on domestic travel and a nationwide curfew from 7pm-6am.

In February 2022, it was reported that no tests are required to enter the country, and children under the age of 12 are free from vaccination requirements.

== Background ==
The pandemic occurred following a series of national protests, which were followed by a strike against pension reform which had been proposed by President Emmanuel Macron in his election manifesto. The pension reform strike was the longest strike in modern French history. In President Emmanuel Macron's second address to the nation on the pandemic on 16 March 2020, he announced the suspension of all reforms, notably those of pensions.

On 12 January 2020, the World Health Organization (WHO) confirmed that a novel coronavirus was the cause of a respiratory illness in a cluster of people in Wuhan, Hubei, China, who had initially come to the attention of the WHO on 31 December 2019. On 21 January 2020, Agnès Buzyn, Minister of Solidarity and Health declared that "The risk of introduction into France is low but it cannot be excluded".

== Timeline ==
Cases

Deaths

=== December 2019 – March 2020: First cases to lockdown ===
==== First cases ====
On 2 December 2019, a man was admitted to Hôpital Albert Schweitzer (Colmar); on 7 May 2020, the director of the medical imagery department claimed that the man had been positive for COVID-19 in December 2019. It is possible the sample was contaminated. His thoracic scan, taken in December 2019, was one of several suspicious scans identified by the hospital as being typical of COVID-19, the earliest of these suspicious scans having been on 16 November 2019.

On 27 December 2019, a man was admitted to Avicenne Hospital and tested for influenza, which came back as negative. On 3 May 2020, Yves Cohen, head of resuscitation at the hospital, said that following a retest of the man's December sample, it had come back positive for COVID-19. Cohen said it was too early to know if the man had been France's "patient zero".

On 23 January 2020, the French Minister of Health's office published an analysis of the situation, and on the same day Air France suspended its flights from and to Wuhan, and reduced the frequency of its flights from and to Beijing and Shanghai.

On 24 January 2020, the first COVID-19 case in Europe was confirmed in Bordeaux. The patient, a 48-year-old French citizen from China, who arrived in France on 22 January 2020, was hospitalised at Centre Hospitalier Universitaire de Bordeaux. He was placed in isolation, and the authorities tried to trace people who had been in contact with him. On the same day that Agnès Buzyn said that "The risks of propagation of the virus in France are extremely low", two more cases were confirmed in Paris – a couple who had returned from China on 18 January 2020. The 31-year-old man and his 30-year-old partner, both from Wuhan, tested positive for SARS-CoV-2 and were hospitalised at Bichat–Claude Bernard Hospital in Paris. On 26 January 2020, Buzyn declared that the French government had millions of masks which could be distributed to the population if necessary.

On 28 January 2020, an 80-year-old Chinese tourist from Hubei tested positive and was hospitalised at Bichat–Claude Bernard Hospital. The following day, his 50-year-old daughter tested positive and was admitted to the same hospital. The death of the 80-year-old on 14 February 2020 marked the first death from COVID-19 outside of Asia.

On 30 January 2020, a Paris doctor who had come into contact with a Chinese tourist whose infection was confirmed upon her return to China was confirmed positive for COVID-19. The same day, Air France suspended all flights to mainland China, except for a single daily flight to Beijing and Shanghai.

On 31 January 2020, Marie Fontanel, the President counselor for solidarity and health, quit her job to help her husband in the coming municipal elections. She would be replaced only one month later. The same day, all the countries of the Schengen Area, except France, suspended the issuing of visas in China.

==== Les Contamines-Montjoie cluster ====
On 8 February 2020, then-Minister of Health Agnès Buzyn confirmed five new cases which originated from a group of people who were on a holiday in Les Contamines-Montjoie, Haute-Savoie. They contracted the infection from a British national who had attended a conference in Singapore a few days before. Another British national, who had stayed in the same chalet as the five other individuals at Les Contamines-Montjoie, tested positive for COVID-19. On 18 February 2020, Minister of Health, Olivier Véran – who replaced Agnès Buzyn after she stood down to run in the Paris mayoral election for La République En Marche! – announced that only four people remained infected in France. These four, all British nationals, three from the first group of Les Contamines-Montjoie and a fourth case which was discovered later, underwent quarantine at the hospital. The last remaining British national was discharged six days later.

==== Sundry cases ====
In late February 2020, multiple cases appeared in France, notably within three new clusters, in Oise, Haute-Savoie, and Morbihan.

Number of cases (blue) and number of deaths (red) on a logarithmic scale.

On 25 February 2020, a French teacher from Crépy-en-Valois died; on the same day, a Chinese man who had returned from China was confirmed as a carrier of SARS-CoV-2, but showed signs of recent recovery. A 64-year-old man from La Balme-de-Sillingy, who returned from a trip to Lombardy on 15 February, tested positive for SARS-CoV-2 and was treated in Centre Hospitalier Annecy-Genevois, Épagny-Metz-Tessy. His wife also tested positive and was admitted to the same hospital as her husband.

On 26 February 2020, a 36-year-old man, who had made multiple trips to Lombardy, tested positive and was treated in Nouvel Hôpital Civil, Strasbourg. A 60-year-old French teacher from Oise was first admitted to Creil Hospital, then transferred to Pitié-Salpêtrière Hospital, Paris, where he died a few hours later. A 55-year-old man from Oise was admitted to the intensive care unit at CHU Amiens-Picardie, Amiens.

The same day, during an audition by the French Senate, Jérôme Salomon, the French Directeur général de la Santé, declared that "A mask shortage is not a subject".

On 27 February 2020, the Minister of Health Olivier Véran announced that France had 38 cases of COVID-19 on its soil, with 20 new cases detected including a cluster in the Oise caused by close contacts with patients that were infected in Egypt.

On 28 February 2020, one new case was confirmed, a 23-year-old fashion student from Nice who had recently returned from Milan. Landes confirmed the first case of COVID-19 in the region, a woman who tested positive at Centre Hospitalier de Mont-de-Marsan and underwent isolation.

==== Mulhouse cluster ====
A religious week in Mulhouse that took place from 17 to 24 February 2020 was involved in the rapid spread of the virus to eastern France and beyond. Linked cases developed from early March in Orléans, Besançon, Saint-Lô, Belfort, Dijon, Mâcon, Agen, Briançon, Paris, Corsica, and French Guiana.

The annual gathering of the Christian Open Door Church between 17 and 24 February 2020 in Mulhouse which was attended by about 2,500 people became a significant cluster in the spread of coronavirus in France. Alerted by a parishioner and by 18 family members who tested positive on 1 March, the pastor notified the health authorities. A man who lived alone in Nîmes – and who had driven back alone from Mulhouse and who otherwise had no close contacts – tested positive, and the flurry of reported cases locally on 2 March brought the existence of a Mulhouse cluster to light.

On 3 March 2020, seven participants in the evangelical rally – including five members of a local family and a general practitioner from Bernwiller – had tested positive for the virus. Starting on the evening of 3 March 2020, the local helpline of the Emergency medical services recorded an unprecedented flood of distress calls, from people who had attended the gathering. According to an investigative report by Radio France, at least half of the attendees had contracted the virus; in an interview on France Info, the pastor of the church admitted that 2000 attendees may have been infected. It is said that no specific health advice existed in light of the threat at the time. The source of the initial infection has not been determined; furthermore, as different attendees were welcomed each day, and due to the absence of any attendance register, epidemiological follow-up subsequent to the discovery of attendees who tested positive was rendered impossible. Even President Emmanuel Macron had spent several hours electioneering on 18 February 2020 in the Bourtzwiller district close to the church. It was only on 2 March 2020 when the health authorities woke up to data that there was an outbreak all over the country linked to the religious meeting, by which time secondary infections had spread out of control.

A Radio France investigation identified that one nurse who had attended the event was the origin of a subsequent cluster in Strasbourg at her workplace at the Strasbourg University Hospitals involving some 250 hospital colleagues. Five returnees from the Mulhouse rally were confirmed in French Guiana on 4 March 2020. On 5 March 2020, a retired couple from Lot-et-Garonne and another person from Deux-Sèvres who had attended the same Mulhouse gathering were declared positive for the disease. Five new cases from this cluster were registered in Corsica, and three in Normandy. On 6 March 2020, with 81 cases that had been detected in the previous 24 hours in Mulhouse, the departmental prefect declared that the means were no longer sufficient to systematically screen all suspected cases; only the most serious patients were to be hospitalised. The department of Haut-Rhin, in which Mulhouse is situated, imposed strict limits on the gatherings; all schools were closed henceforth.

==== Repatriations ====
On 31 January 2020, approximately 220 French returnees from China landed at Istres-Le Tubé Air Base, aboard an Airbus A340 from Esterel 3/60 transport squadron stationed at Creil Air Base. These evacuees were quarantined in a holiday camp in Carry-le-Rouet. A second wave of repatriation took place on 2 February 2020 when 65 evacuated French nationals on board a chartered Airbus A380-800 Hi Fly Malta landed at the Istres air base. A third repatriation of 38 French occurred on 8 February 2020 under the auspices of the British government.

On 21 February 2020, a further thirty French people who had been staying in Wuhan were repatriated to France and placed in quarantine at Branville, in the Calvados. On 13 March 2020, twelve trainee gendarmes at the School of Gendarmerie of Tulle (Corrèze) saw their internship in Spain terminated, with them and their 20 companions repatriated. They had been confined from 10 March 2020 following the positive test results of two of their Spanish cohort.

==== Municipal elections ====
The first round of municipal elections in France took place on 15 March 2020 against the backdrop of the government decision to move to Stage III of measures to prevent the spread of the coronavirus. Stringent restrictions on public life involving the closure of bars, restaurants and other businesses considered non-essential were set to begin the following day. Then-Health Minister, Agnès Buzyn, resigned on 16 February 2020 to run for the Paris mayor for La République En Marche!. She is succeeded by Olivier Véran, a neurologist. The decision to press ahead with the election was justified as being critical to democratic life in the country, despite concerns about how a second round could be held as the toll of infections and deaths continued to rise. In the end, the turnout of registered voters was 40%, lower than achieved in 1971 – the previous record lowest turnout.

A number of communes in various parts of the country reported that despite the safety measures put in place by the government, some candidates and assessors had subsequently developed symptoms or tested positive for the virus.

==== Lockdown measures ====
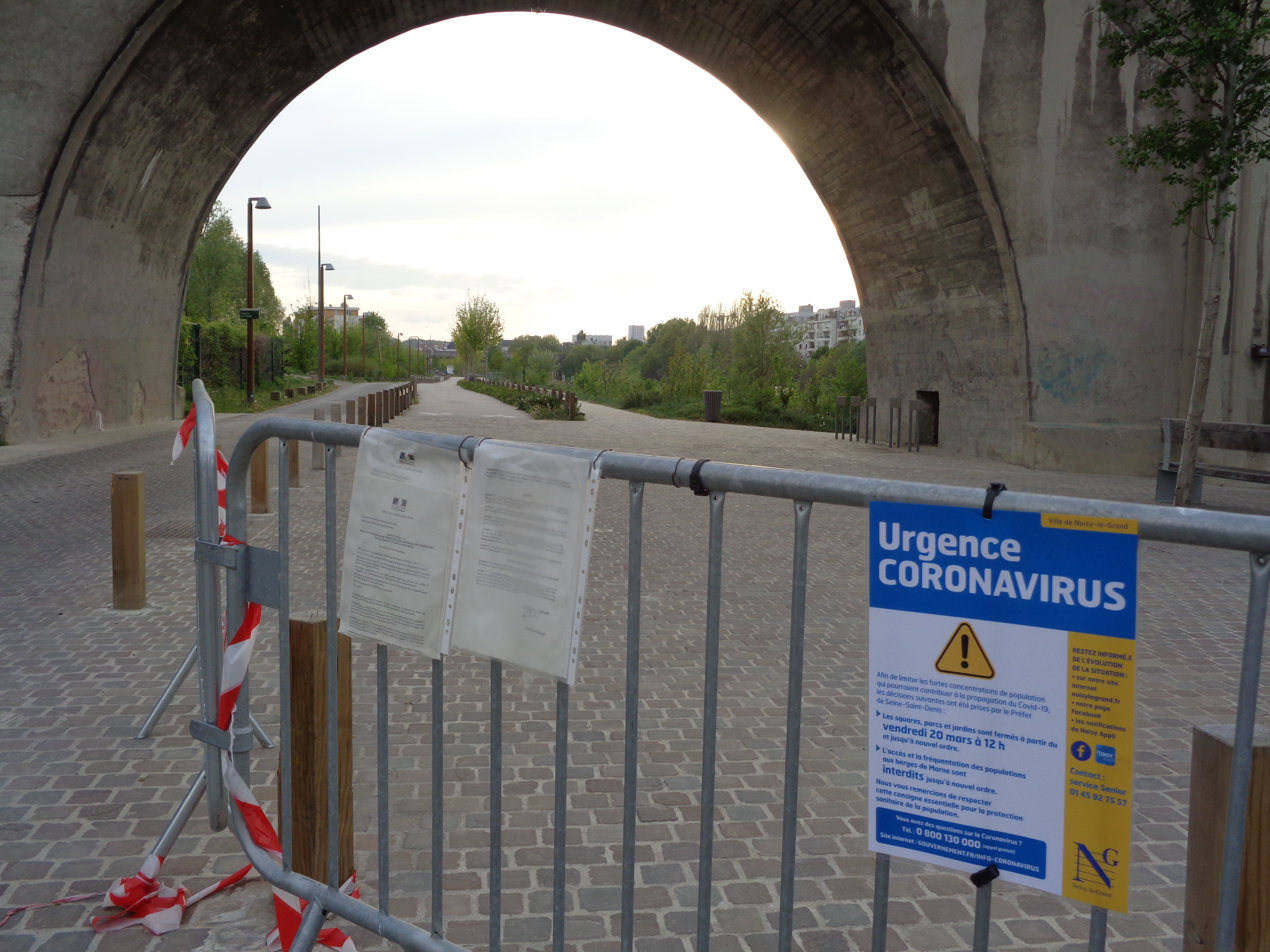
In Noisy-le-Grand in the suburbs of Paris, strolling along the river Marne has been forbidden "until further notice"

On 11 March 2020, the government named 11 prominent scientists to a committee to advise on scientific matters pertaining to the epidemic in France. On 17 March 2020, the Direction générale de la Santé (DGS) asked Santé publique France to buy urgently 1,1 million of FFP2 masks.

On 12 March 2020, Emmanuel Macron announced in a televised address that all schools and universities across the country would be closed.

On 13 March 2020, the Prime Minister, Édouard Philippe announced the closure of all pubs, restaurants, cinemas and nightclubs.

On 16 March 2020 (one day after the first round of the municipal elections), Emmanuel Macron announced the beginning of a lockdown period from 17 March 2020 at noon.

After the announcement of the lockdown, the Fédération Française du Bâtiment decided to stop non-essential work because of the danger for construction workers. On 19 March 2020, Muriel Pénicaud, the French Minister of Labour, criticized this decision, saying that it showed a lack of civic spirit. On 20 March 2020, the President of the federation replied in an open letter that what the Minister said was "scandalous". After several days, an agreement allowing a few construction sites to reopen was signed.

=== April–May 2020: First peak ===
During early April 2020, the numbers of deaths from coronavirus increased dramatically, with more than 10,000 people dying during that period of time.

The lockdown had initially been planned for 15 days, then for 30 days, but on 13 April 2020, Macron announced that the lockdown period would be extended until 11 May 2020.

On 4 May 2020, scientists retesting old samples found that a man had been infected with COVID-19 on 27 December 2019, almost a month before France reported its first case. The patient had not travelled abroad which sparked fears that the coronavirus might have been spreading in Europe earlier than leaders had thought.

On 11 May 2020, as daily cases had dropped to under 100 per day, primary schools and some middle schools were allowed to reopen in what was the first steps to reopening the economy.

On 28 May 2020, Édouard Philippe announced that a travel ban of 100 km (62 miles) would be lifted on 2 June 2020. Cafes, bars and restaurants were also allowed to reopen on the same day. This easing of restrictions did not apply to Paris.

=== June–July 2020: Easing of restrictions ===
On 14 June 2020, Cafes, Restaurants and Pubs were allowed to reopen in Paris.

On 22 June 2020, Cinemas, holiday centres, sports halls for group sports, all crèches, schools, and collèges (middle school) were allowed to reopen in what was the third stage of reopening the economy.

On 1 July 2020, France reopened its borders with non-European Union countries.

On 3 July 2020, Philippe resigned as Prime Minister and was replaced by Jean Castex. Castex had previously been appointed coordinator of the phasing out of the lockdown (confinement) implemented in France.

On 10 July 2020, the State of Health Emergency in France came to an end, essentially ending the lockdown. However, there were still restrictions on social distancing.

On 15 July 2020, Olivier Véran announced that from 24 July 2020, face coverings would be compulsory in all public indoor spaces and some outdoor public areas such as the Eiffel Tower.

=== August–October 2020 ===
During August 2020, cases began to rise again. In the week ending 16 August 2020, more than 10,000 cases were reported during that week.

On 28 August 2020, France set a new record for the number of new cases in a single 24-hour period with 7,379 new cases reported. With this in mind, Paris made it compulsory to wear face coverings in most public spaces.

On 12 September 2020, France recorded more than 10,000 new cases in a single 24-hour period for the first time. Deaths had also begun to rise again, with 154 recorded on 18 September 2020, the highest since 17 May 2020 and the first time daily deaths increased by more than 100 since 16 June 2020.

On 5 October 2020, Paris once again shut its pubs, restaurants and cafes over a resurgence in cases, the second city to do so after Marseille. However, the government kept insisting that they would not impose a second nationwide lockdown.

On 10 October 2020, France recorded its then biggest daily increase in new cases with 26,896 new infections. President Macron announced in an interview on prime-time television on 14 October 2020 that in view of the vertiginous spread of the disease in several major cities, there would be 9 pm–6am curfews imposed in areas which have become hotspots for the virus in the country, to last for 4 weeks; the financial aid measures and furloughing scheme for affected business would be re-introduced.

On 15 October 2020, France became the first country in Europe to record more than 30,000 cases in a day, with 30,621 cases reported. This increase pushed France over the 800,000 mark in terms of cases, only the third country in Europe to reach this figure.

On 22 October 2020, Prime Minister of France Jean Castex extended the overnight curfew to 38 more departments as cases surged, affecting 46 million people (67% population).

On 23 October 2020, France's confirmed cases of COVID-19 passed 1 million. The total number of confirmed cases was 1,048,075, with an increase of 42,032, the highest daily rise in a 24-hour period.

On 25 October 2020, daily cases topped 50,000 for the first time, with a total of 52,013 new cases reported.

On 28 October 2020, Macron announced on a televised address that France would enter a second nationwide lockdown from 30 October 2020 that would last until at least 1 December 2020. Non-essential businesses such as pubs and restaurants would close but schools and factories would remain open.

=== November 2020 ===
On 5 November 2020, Paris Mayor Anne Hidalgo announced further restrictions in Paris after some citizens were caught disobeying existing rules. These included requiring food shops to close at 10:00 pm to prevent people from gathering there.

On 12 November 2020, French Prime Minister Jean Castex said in a press conference that any loosening of restrictions at the start of December would be "strictly limited", meaning businesses like restaurants, bars and sports halls would remain closed. He also stated that 1 in 4 deaths in France were at that time due to COVID-19.

=== December 2020 ===
On 17 December 2020, Macron tested positive for COVID-19.

On 27 December 2020, a 78-year-old woman became the first person in France to get vaccinated against COVID-19. She received the first dose of Pfizer-BioNTech vaccine at the René-Muret Hospital in Sevran, Seine-Saint-Denis.

=== 2021 ===
On 31 March 2021, in a televised address to the nation, President Macron announced a third national lockdown to begin on 3 April 2021, and to last for at least a month. Macron warned that the country would "lose control if we do not move now". Principal measures announced included the closure of non-essential shops during the national lockdown and the suspension of attendance at schools for three weeks. During the national lockdown, domestic travel was banned and a nationwide curfew from 7pm-6am remained in place.

On 25 April, health authorities that the country has 5,473,579 confirmed cases with 76,502 deaths and 13,834,667 people have been given the first dose of vaccine.

On 29 April, President Macron announced dates for the easing of restrictions from the third national lockdown:

- 19 May: Curfew moves from 19:00 to 21:00. Shops, museums, cinemas, terraces, outdoor sports venues can reopen. Gatherings of more than ten people are prohibited.
- 9 June: Curfew extended to 23:00. Cafes and restaurants can reopen inside with tables of up to six people.
- 30 June: Curfew comes to an end.

On 2 December, the first confirmed case of the Omicron variant in France have been reported.

=== 2022 ===
On 5 January, President Macron said he, "really wants to piss off the non-vaccinated".

On 13 January, the French Senate approves President Macron's new set of measures that include a vaccine pass to enter public facilitates.

=== Timeline of measures ===
National restrictions (within metropolitan France) relating to the COVID-19 Pandemic

Legend

1. School closures
2. Closure of restaurants and museums
3. Travel restrictions: full stay-at-home order, part-time curfew, beyond 100 km
4. Legal regime : sanitary state of emergency, lifting of state of emergency
5. Health pass restrictions

Measures enacted	Effective from
4–14 March 2020 : First bans on gatherings
Ban on gatherings of more than 5000 people in enclosed spaces	5 March 2020
Ban on all gatherings of more than 1000 people	10 March 2020
Ban on all gatherings of more than 100 people	14 March 2020
Ban on ships carrying more than 100 passengers from calling in on or anchoring in inland and territorial waters	14 March 2020
17 March 2020 – 10 May 2020: First national lockdown
Closure of most public establishments. Only "essential services (food shops, pharmacies, banks, newsagents, petrol/service stations...) and all essential public services" are authorised to remain open. Citizens asked to "avoid gatherings where possible, limit meetings with friends and family, only use public transport to go to work if presence at the workplace is essential, and to only leave the home to buy essential groceries, to briefly exercise or to vote in local elections"	15 March 2020
Closure of schools and institutes of higher education	16 March 2020
Ban on all religious gatherings except for funeral services with fewer than 20 attendees	16 March 2020
Ban on all travel except relating to professional activity, buying essential goods, health or family reasons or brief individual exercise. Those outside the home were required to carry identification and a signed and dated declaration (attestation) for any travel.	17 March 2020
Ban on embalming. All suspected or confirmed cases of death due to COVID-19 were to be placed in coffins immediately.	24 March 2020
11 May 2020 – 1 June 2020: Progressive lifting of lockdown restrictions
Ban on gatherings of more than 10 people in a public space across all French territory. More generally, all gatherings, meetings, activities, travel and users of public transport were required to respect social distancing rules. Public access to parks, gardens and green spaces in urban areas was prohibited in areas of France classified as 'red zones'. Most businesses could re-open but restaurants, cafes and bars remained shut. A travel declaration (attestation) was no longer needed for travel outside one's place of residence. Full lockdown restrictions remained in the overseas department of Mayotte.	11 May 2020
Ban on travel outside the department of residence or exceeding a 100 km radius from one's place of residence, except in specified circumstances. Citizens were still required to carry identification, and a signed declaration, for any travel outside a 100 km radius of one's residence or for travel on public transport during peak hours. Masks were made compulsory on public transport. More generally, all gatherings, meetings, activities, travel and usage of public transport were required to respect social distancing rules. Public access to parks, gardens and green spaces in urban areas was prohibited in areas of France that are classified as 'red zones'. Full lockdown restrictions remained in the overseas department of Mayotte.	12 May 2020
Parks in red zones reopened.	30 May 2020
2–22 June 2020
Restaurants and museums allowed to re-open across most of France, although a ban on indoor seating in restaurants is maintained in the 'orange zones' of Île-de-France, French Guiana and Mayotte. A declaration was no longer required for travel exceeding 100 km.	2 June 2020
Demonstrations that abide by social distancing guidelines are permitted. Île-de-France becomes a 'green' zone, allowing restaurants and cafes to open fully, although French Guiana and Mayotte remain 'orange'.	15 June 2020
A declaration (attestation) is no longer required to travel on public transport during rush hour.	16–21 June 2020
Cinemas were re-opened.	22 June 2020
11–19 July 2020
Majority of restrictions lifted, although a ban on gatherings of more than 5000 people remained, and nightclubs stayed closed, and masks remained obligatory on public transport. The state of emergency remained in effect in the overseas departments of French Guiana and Mayotte until 16 September.	11 July
20 July 2020 – 16 October 2020: Extension of mask-wearing rules
Masks made mandatory in an extended range of public places.	20 July 2020
Prefectures given powers to expand mandatory mask-wearing measures	29 July 2020
On 4 August 2020, Paris makes mask wearing compulsory for pedestrians outdoors in some streets in the city and extends the area several times over the following weeks.	4 August 2020
Paris and the department of Bouches-du-Rhône are classed as 'red' departments in which the virus is actively circulating.	13 August 2020
19 additional departments are classed as 'red': Alpes-Maritimes, Essonne, Gard, Gironde, Guadeloupe, Haute-Garonne, Hauts-de-Seine, Hérault, Loiret, Martinique, Rhône, Sarthe, Seine-et-Marne, Seine-Saint-Denis, Val-d'Oise, Val-de-Marne, Var, Vaucluse and Yvelines.	27 August 2020
Mask-wearing is made compulsory outdoors in the whole of Paris and its inner suburbs (Hauts-de-Seine, Seine-Saint-Denis and Val-de-Marne) for pedestrians age 11 and older.	28 August 2020
Mask-wearing required in workplaces.	1 September 2020
Schools reopen with mask requirements for teachers and students age 11 and older.	1 September 2020
17 October 2020 – 14 December 2020: Introduction of curfews and second national lockdown
Overnight curfew (9pm to 6 am) in Paris and suburbs; Marseille, Lyon, Lille, Saint-Etienne, Rouen, Toulouse, Grenoble and Montpellier. Gatherings of more than six people discouraged.	17 October 2020
Overnight curfews extended to 38 French departments.	24 October 2020
Second national lockdown begins, with similar restrictions to the first national lockdown except that primary- and secondary school children can still attend school.	30 October 2020
Non-essential services can re-open and exercise restrictions relaxed to 3 hours a day within a 20 km radius of one's place of residence.	28 November 2020
15 December 2020 – 26 February 2021
Travel restrictions are lifted and a declaration (attestation) is no longer needed to leave one's residence apart from during overnight curfew hours of between 8 pm and 6 am every day.	15 December 2020
Curfew hours extended nationally to between 6 pm and 6 am every day.	16 January 2021
Closure of shops above a given size	31 January 2021
26 February 2021 – 2 May 2021: Third set of regional and national lockdowns relating to Alpha variant
Weekend lockdowns imposed in the Côte d'Azur and Dunkirk regions	26 February 2021
Daily lockdowns imposed in 16 departments including the whole of Île-de-France, Hauts-de-France, Upper Normandy and the department of Alpes-Maritimes in Provence-Alpes-Côte d'Azur. For these areas, a declaration (attestation) is required for travel beyond 10 km of one's place of residence while non-essential travel to other regions is prohibited. All non-essential shops are to close, albeit with an expanded definition of what is considered essential. Curfew hours shifted nationally to between 7 pm and 6 am every day.	20 March 2021
Daily lockdown rules as above, but extended to the whole of Metropolitan France.	3 April 2021
Closure of schools and higher education establishments	5 April 2021
3 May 2021 – 12 July 2021: Progressive lifting of lockdown restrictions
Non-essential travel permitted beyond 10 km during the day, secondary schools re-open (with primary schools re-opening on 25 April).	3 May 2021
Non-essential shops, cinemas, theatres, museums and restaurants/bars/cafes with outdoor seating allowed to re-open. Curfew pushed back to 9 pm.	19 May 2021
Restaurants/bars/cafes allowed to re-open indoors to 50% capacity. Curfew pushed back to 11 pm. Health pass required to access establishments holding gatherings of over 1000 people.	9 June 2021
Outdoor mask-wearing rules relaxed	17 June 2021
Nightly curfew abolished	20 June 2021
13 July 2021 – 1 February 2022: Restrictions relating to Delta and Omicron variants
Re-introduction of sanitary state of emergency in the overseas departments of Réunion and Martinique, with an 11 pm curfew introduced in Réunion and a 9 pm curfew introduced in Martinique.	13 July 2021
All people over 12 require a health pass to access venues welcoming over 50 people (e.g. museums, theatres, cinemas, festivals and sport/leisure centres). Such a health pass is valid either from a week after being fully vaccinated, within 2 days of a negative PCR or antigen test, or within 11 days – 6 months after having recovered from Covid.	21 July 2021
Health pass extended to bars/restaurants/cafes as well as intercity travel by public transport.	9 August 2021
Facemasks made compulsory for all primary school children	15 November 2021
Unvaccinated people who have not recently recovered from Covid willing to go to venues where the health pass is enforced must have had a negative PCR or antigen test within the preceding 24 hours, as opposed to 48 hours previously.	29 November 2021
Closure of nightclubs	11 December 2021
Anyone over the age of 65 who has not had the booster within 4 months of their second dose, or anyone who initially received the J&J/Janssen single-dose vaccine before 15 October who has not had a second dose before 15 December, must receive a booster to reactivate their health pass.	15 December 2021
Ban on indoor gatherings of over 2000 people and outdoor gatherings of more than 5000 people. Consumption of food and drink banned in large venues and on public transport. Table-seating compulsory at restaurants and bars. Minimum age for wearing facemasks in markets and public transport reduced from 11 to 6. Remote work mandated for at least 3 days a week.	3 January 2022
Anyone over the age of 18 who has not had a dose of the vaccine in the preceding 7 months will have their health pass deactivated and must receive a booster to reactivate their health pass.	15 January 2022
Unvaccinated people over the age of 16 are no longer able to get a health pass by providing a negative test result, unless they are partially vaccinated but have not yet completed the full course of doses. However, they can activate their health pass by providing a certificate that proves they cannot receive the vaccine on legitimate medical grounds (attestation de contre-indication)	24 January 2022
2 Feb 2022 – 1 Aug 2022 : Progressive lifting of restrictions, transition to endemic phase of Covid
Masks no longer required in outdoor public spaces. Mandatory remote working abolished. Restrictions on sizes of public gatherings removed.	2 February 2022
Nightclubs reopen, table service no longer compulsory in restaurants and bars, ban on consumption of food and drink in public transport and indoor public spaces lifted.	16 February 2022
Relaxation of mask rules in primary schools	21 February 2022
Masks no longer required in indoor public spaces that require a vaccine pass to enter, except on intercity public transport.	28 February 2022
Masks no longer required in any indoor public spaces apart from in public transport or hospitals and care homes. Health pass laws repealed.	14 March 2022
Masks no longer required in public transport.	16 May 2022
Sanitary state of emergency lifted. Parliamentary approval required for further measures.	1 August 2022

== Situation by region ==
=== Auvergne-Rhône-Alpes ===
On 25 February 2020, a man from La Balme-de-Sillingy, who had returned from Italy, was declared infected and hospitalised in Annecy. He had been asymptomatic the previous evening, and so was the trigger for a cluster in Haute-Savoie. One day later his wife was hospitalised. On 27 February, a friend and his daughter followed him into the hospital. On 2 March 2020, 26 people were COVID-19 positive in Haute-Savoie. The hospital in Annecy being saturated, a case was transferred to Chambéry. François Daviet, the mayor of La Balme-de-Sillingy was also hospitalised.

On 27 February 2020, a man from Francheville was admitted to a Lyon hospital and tested positive for coronavirus. Three new cases were reported in the city of Lyon on 1 March.

A couple from Divonne-les-Bains were infected after a journey in Italy and hospitalised in neighbouring Switzerland on 29 February 2020. On the same day, two other men from Ferney-Voltaire, one French national who works in Switzerland and one Italian national, were also hospitalised in the Helvetic Country.

On 2 March 2020, an 89-year-old woman from Nyons was treated at Valréas hospital in the Enclave of the Popes in Vaucluse and tested COVID-19 positive. On the same day there were four new cases in Haute-Savoie.

=== Burgundy-Franche-Comté ===
On 2 March 2020, 10 cases were reported at the Dijon hospital. The first wave was reported on 27 February with cases related to the Oise cluster who subsequently infected their relatives. Five new cases of COVID-19 were confirmed on 3 March. The 15 cases in the region received care at Dijon CHU. Four cases in Côte-d'Or had been in contact with someone who was already hospitalised, while another case in Saône-et-Loire was in Italy the previous week.

=== Brittany ===
On 2 March 2020, 19 cases were reported in Brittany. Two were in the western city of Brest, an elderly man from Plougonvelin, returning from a trip from Egypt and his wife. There were also four cases in the regional capital Rennes, a firefighter and his wife, and two people who had returned from Veneto. 13 others cases were reported in Morbihan, around a cluster of 6 in Crac'h, 3 in Auray, 3 in Carnac and 1 in Saint-Philibert.

Also on 2 March 2020, the fourth death in France, and the first one in Brittany occurred, a 92-year-old man, who had been hospitalised in Vannes.

As of 29 March 2020, 962 cases had been reported as follows : 208 in Ille-et-Vilaine, 230 in Finistère, 313 in Morbihan and 107 in Côtes d'Armor.

=== Grand Est ===
On 26 February 2020, a 36-year-old man who had made repeated trips to the Italian region of Lombardy was hospitalised in Strasbourg but didn't have severe symptoms.

On 2 March 2020, it was announced that ten more people tested positive in the Grand Est, eight hospitalised in Strasbourg and three in Nancy. In Alsace, a Molsheim couple was hospitalised. The man had returned from Italy and was hospitalised first, followed by his wife. Four members of a family from Hésingue, a 27-year-old mother and her two children aged five and one, as well as one of the grandfathers, a 57-year-old man, were infected. Two others cases identified in the Bas-Rhin, a 49-year-old man and his 14-year-old son, had been in contact with a person from the Oise hospitalised in Amiens. Three family members were hospitalised in Nancy, a father and his son, aged 50 and 23, and the girl-friend of the 50-year-old patient, all from the department of Aisne.

=== Hauts-de-France ===
As of 2 March 2020, 67 people were infected by COVID-19 in the Hauts-de-France region. This figure, the highest in France, was linked to a major cluster originating in the city of Creil, in the Oise, whose source remains unknown. The five departments of Hauts-de-France now each had at least one proven case of people infected by the coronavirus. In Aisne and Pas-de-Calais, spared by the epidemic until 1 March, the authorities confirmed the presence of patients with COVID-19, except the Nord where hospitalisations without local infections had taken place. Some days before, on 26 February, a man died overnight after being rushed to a Paris hospital from Creil where he was hospitalised for 6 days in ICU in serious condition, bringing the total death toll in the country to two at that time. On 2 March 2020, it was announced the second death in Hauts-de-France and the third at the national level, a woman of 89 "diagnosed post-mortem" at the hospital of Compiègne. She had other serious pre-existing conditions.

=== Île-de-France ===
On 25 February 2020, a young woman returned from China was hospitalised in the Bichat–Claude Bernard Hospital, Paris but showed signs of recovery and was out of hospital on 26 February 2020.

On 28 February 2020, an infected person from the Val-d'Oise, returning from Italy was hospitalised in Bichat–Claude Bernard Hospital, Paris. He was working for a contractor of Charles de Gaulle Airport. On the same day, Hôpital Tenon, which had received a patient from the Oise before he had been diagnosed, announced that it had been directly affected by the coronavirus with three infected medical personnel.

Two cases of Coronavirus had been identified in Seine-Saint-Denis in Montreuil in the same family, a father and his child, on 2 March 2020.

Despite the COVID-19 pandemic, a substantial International Women's Day march occurred in Paris on 8 March 2020.

=== Normandy ===
On 27 February 2020, a doctor from the Rouen University Hospital was declared a positive carrier of COVID-19 and was confined to his home, after a professional journey to Munich. A second case of coronavirus was confirmed in Normandy on 2 March. He is a French resident in Eure. He was hospitalised at the Rouen University Hospital.

=== Nouvelle-Aquitaine ===
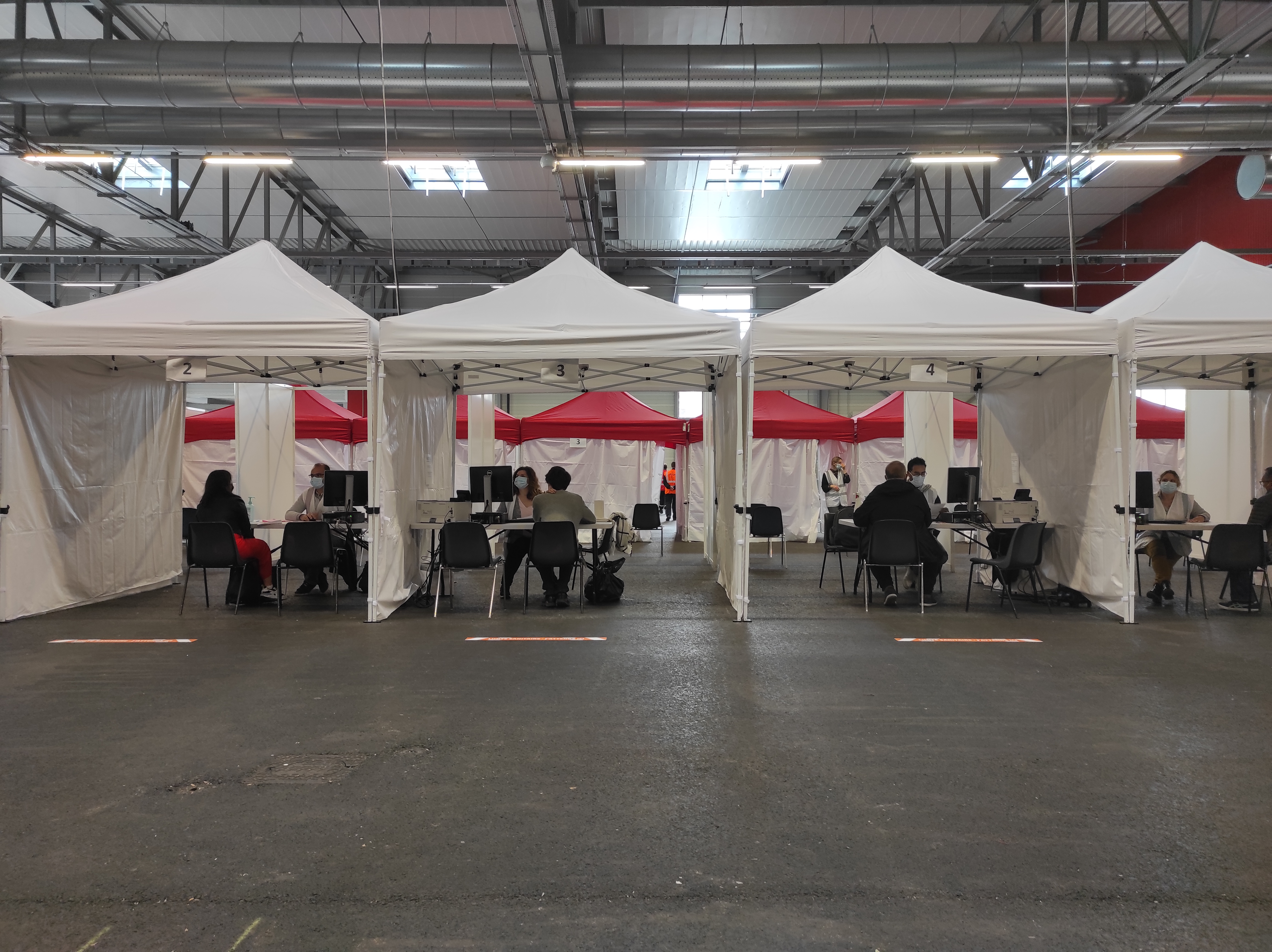
COVID-19 vaccination booths in the city of Poitiers, in 2021

After news of the first infected individuals in Europe had been released in late January, three new patients were declared COVID-19 positive in February, a patient in Bordeaux who was hospitalised at the Bordeaux University Hospital after returning from a stay in Italy, a soldier from Rochefort, Charente-Maritime who had had contact with people from the Creil air base in the Oise, who was hospitalised in Poitiers, and a woman from Mont-de-Marsan who had also been in contact with cases in Creil, who was hospitalised in Bordeaux.

=== Occitania ===
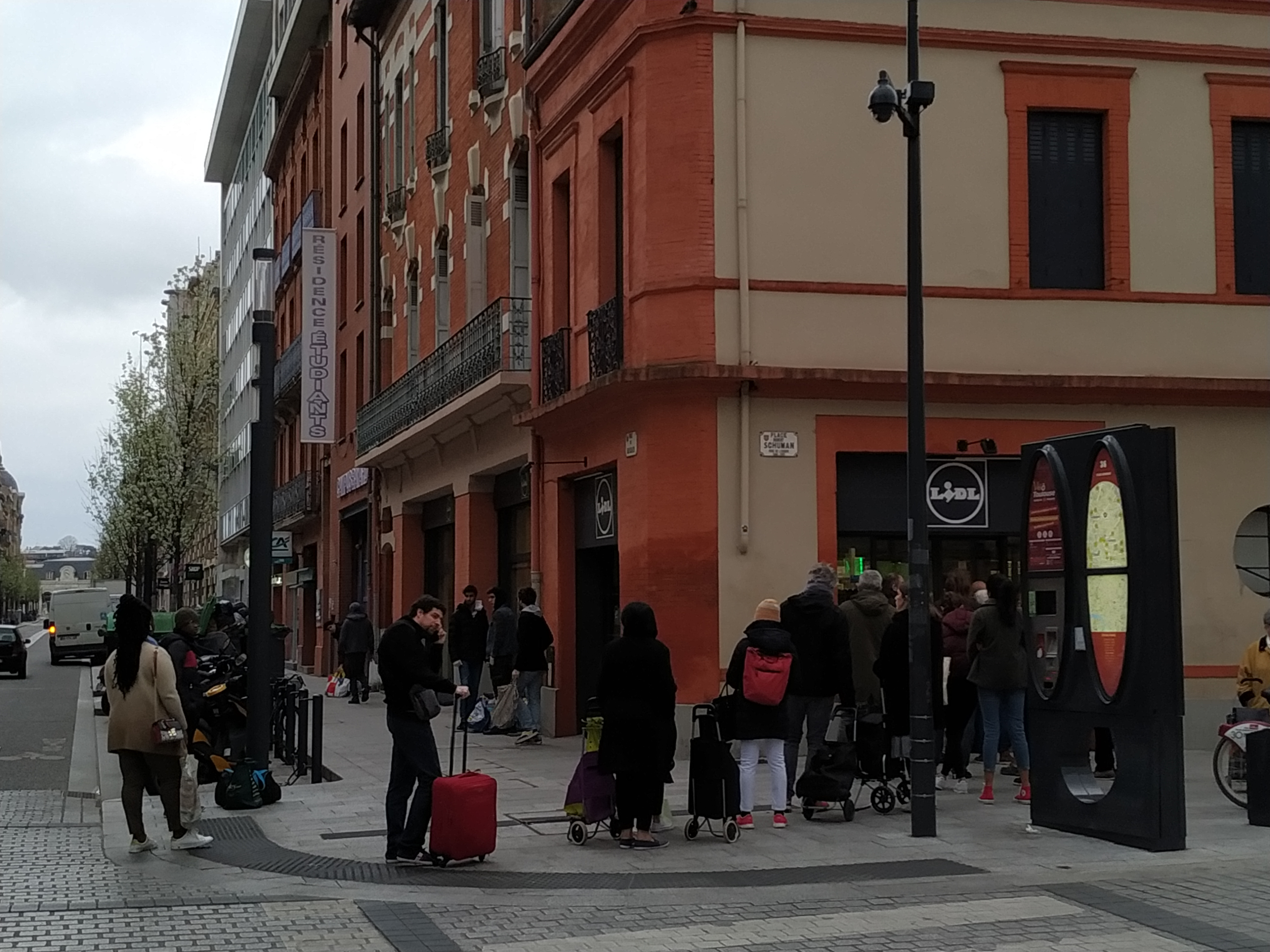
Residents of Toulouse maintain social distance while queueing

Three cases were declared in Occitania in February 2020, all in Montpellier. A man who recently returned from Italy was diagnosed on 27 February 2020, followed the next day by his wife and a 41-year-old man recently returned from Emilia-Romagna. On 1 March 2020, the two children of the couple were hospitalised and one was COVID-19 positive. On 2 March 2020, two new cases were announced there: a 31-year-old man and his 29-year-old wife, also back from Emilia-Romagna. One day later, a 70-year-old man from the village of Boisset-et-Gaujac in the Gard was hospitalised in Nîmes.

On 2 March 2020, a case in Nimes was traced to the mid-February Mulhouse Megachurch event. This case helped identify the Mulhouse cluster.

=== Pays de la Loire ===
A 58-year-old female general practitioner, tested positive for coronavirus and was hospitalised on 27 February 2020, at the Nantes University Hospital. Hers was the first confirmed case in the Pays de la Loire region. She lived near Compiègne, in the Oise department, where a dozen cases had already been identified. On 13 February 2020, she had seen a patient who was later hospitalised in an intensive care unit in Amiens.

On 2 March 2020, four people were hospitalised at the Angers University Hospital for cases of coronavirus. The first case was detected on 28 February 2020; a 27-year-old woman from the Sarthe declared herself to the SAMU centre 15 after a stay in Milan in Italy. Three other cases have since been detected in Mayenne and Maine-et-Loire. They were infected by a patient from Brest.

=== Provence-Alpes-Côte d'Azur ===
The first case of the Provence-Alpes-Côte d'Azur region was announced on 28 February 2020. A young woman from Cannes was infected after a journey in Milan. One day later three new cases were hospitalised, two French vacationers returned from a risk zone and an Italian tourist. Two new cases appeared during the weekend of 29 February 2020 and 1 March 2020: a 15-year-old adolescent and a 23-year-old woman. On 2 March 2020, a seventh case was announced, a 3-year-old girl.

On 29 February 2020, Monaco announced its first COVID-19 case, a man who was admitted to the Princess Grace Hospital Centre, then transferred to the Nice University Hospital in France.

On 22 March 2020, the Alpes-Maritimes prefecture issued a decree putting into place a curfew from 10 pm to 5 am affecting cities of more than 10,000 residents and all towns on the Mediterranean coast until 31 March 2020. This replaced local measures which had already been taken in Nice, Béziers, and Cannes.

=== Overseas regions ===
==== French Guiana ====
As of 4 March 2020, French Guiana had five confirmed cases, all in Saint-Laurent du Maroni. The first death was announced on 20 April 2020.

==== Guadeloupe ====
By 26 March 2020, there had been 84 positive cases and 1 death in Guadeloupe.

==== Martinique ====
The COVID-19 pandemic was confirmed to have reached the Martinique on 5 March 2020. By 15 March 2020, the first virus-related death had occurred and there were 15 infected patients in Martinique.

==== Mayotte ====
The COVID-19 pandemic was confirmed to have reached Mayotte on 10 March 2020. On 31 March 2020, the first person died of COVID-19.

==== Réunion ====
The COVID-19 pandemic was confirmed to have reached Réunion on 11 March 2020.

=== Overseas and sui generis collectivities ===
==== French Polynesia ====
Maina Sage, a French politician representing French Polynesia at the French national assembly, was diagnosed with the first case of COVID-19 in French Polynesia on 11 March 2020.

==== New Caledonia ====
As of 19 March, there have been two cases in New Caledonia.

==== Saint Barthélemy ====
A resident of the French island of Saint Barthélemy was diagnosed with COVID-19 on 1 March 2020. His parents on the neighbouring island of Saint Martin also tested positive.

==== Saint Martin ====
A couple from the French part of Saint Martin island was diagnosed with COVID-19 on 1 March 2020. Their son, who lives on the neighbouring island of Saint Barthélemy, also tested positive.

==== Wallis and Futuna ====
The first case in Wallis and Futuna was reported on 16 October 2020.

=== Charles de Gaulle aircraft carrier ===
The Ministry of Armed Forces reported infections on board one of its ships on 8 April 2020. After about 40 crew members aboard the aircraft carrier Charles de Gaulle showed symptoms, the ship cut short its mission and returned to its home port of Toulon on 12 April 2020, 11 days earlier than planned. The ministry initially announced that out of 66 personnel tested, 50 were positive. Three sailors were evacuated by air to Saint Anne Army Teaching Hospital. On 18 April 2020, the final count of infected crew members was announced as 1,046 with nearly 50 percent diagnosed as asymptomatic.

The carrier arrived in Toulon on the afternoon of 12 April 2020, when a 14-day quarantine for the crew began. The source of the infection remains unknown, as the last port of call had been Brest from 13 to 15 March.

There was criticism in France the carrier mission was not interrupted after the first cases were detected, and rumours that the carrier had asked permission to interrupt its mission in mid March during its stopover in Brest, which had been refused. Florence Parly, the French Minister of Armed Forces, said that these rumours were false when questioned by French deputies.

== Effects on civilian life ==
Empty streets in Paris

Some stores that remain open impose disciplined queuing for customers waiting to enter

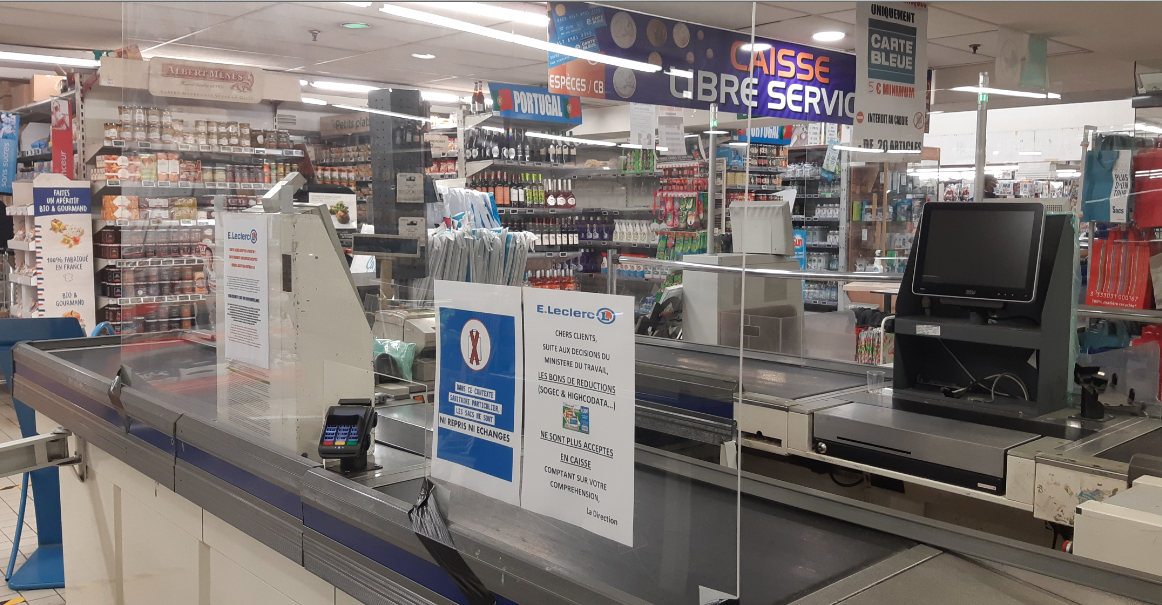
Major supermarket chains installed equipment to safeguard staff and customers

=== Closures ===
On 28 February 2020, the fashion designer agnès b. cancelled fashion shows in Paris Fashion Week, which had been scheduled to run until 3 March. The following day, the Paris half marathon scheduled for Sunday 1 March 2020, with 44,000 participants was cancelled as one of a number of measures announced by health minister Olivier Véran (which also included the banning of all indoor public gatherings of more than 5,000 people).

In a televised statement on 12 March 2020, President of the Republic Emmanuel Macron decreed the closure of nurseries, schools, colleges, high schools and universities. The Ministry of Health requested the deprogramming of non-urgent surgical procedures. From the next day, gatherings of more than 100 people were prohibited.

On 13 March 2020, the Ligue de Football Professionnel suspended Ligue 1 and Ligue 2 (the top two divisions of football in France) indefinitely due to health risks.

On 14 March 2020, many cultural institutions announced their closure. These are mainly Parisian institutions or institutions in the Paris region, such as Louvre, Centre Georges Pompidou, Eiffel Tower, Musée d'Orsay, and Château de Versailles, but also institutions in the provinces such as Château de Montsoreau – Museum of Contemporary Art, CAPC – Musée d'Art Contemporain de Bordeaux, MUCEM in Marseille.

=== Restrictions on movement ===
Starting from 23 March 2020, everyone in a public space was required to carry a self-completed declaration, known as an "Attestation de déplacement dérogatoire", which stated one's reasons for being out in public. Without this declaration individuals could be fined if found engaging in non-essential movement. Acceptable reasons for being outside included: shopping for food and essential needs, traveling to and from a place of work, if the work could not be performed at home, accessing necessary healthcare, traveling for essential family matters including childcare or care of the elderly or to assist vulnerable people, exercising within 1 km of the home for up to 1 hour during permitted hours, for an administrative legal matter (such as a summons), or at the direction of an administrative authority. Initially it was necessary to carry a paper copy of the declaration but later a QR code based electronic equivalent for smartphones became an option. Most of the requirements of these measures expired on 11 May 2020 with the expiration of the general stay-at-home order however new requirements subsequently came into effect limiting general travel to a range of 100 km from one's residence without a permit. The 100 km limitation remained in effect until 2 June.

Police around the country set up road blocks to check those outside their homes had good reason and that their exemption declarations were in order. Up to 7 April 2020, more than 8 million checks had been made, and half a million fines had been issued for failure to respect rules of confinement. Police report receiving hundreds of telephone denunciations from citizens complaining of their neighbours walking their dogs too often; a woman also denounced her husband for going out to see his mistress.

On 28 September 2020, according to an Amnesty International report French authorities wrongly punished thousands of peaceful protesters under draconian laws in pre and post COVID-19 crackdowns. Many people were arbitrarily fined, arrested, and detained for peaceful protests.

=== Unemployment ===
President Macron announced on 12 March 2020 that companies could postpone the payment of social security contributions and taxes due in March without justification, formalities, or penalties. An "exceptional and massive" mechanism of state-funded furloughing (partial lay-offs) was envisaged. Employees were encouraged to remote work where possible. During the second half of March, 4 million French workers applied for temporary unemployment benefits. As of April 2020, approximately 8.6 million employees in France were furloughed. The total cost of the operation for the three months from March was €24 billion.

The French state, which has hitherto borne 100% of the costs of furloughing, reduced the indemnity to 85% from 1 June 2020, with businesses footing 15% of the bill; employees will receive 70% of their gross pay, or around 84% of their net salary. Employees in sectors of activity related to restaurants, culture and tourism, which remain subject to forced closure, continue to receive 100% state indemnity. According to the French statistical agency INSEE, 3% of the French labor force frequently teleworks. 2% of French workers travel fewer than 5 kilometers from their home to work, and 8% must travel more than 50 km.

=== Riots in the Paris region ===
From 18 April 2020, suburbs near Paris saw several nights of violent clashes over police treatment of ethnic minorities in the banlieues during the coronavirus lockdown.

=== Fatal bus attack ===
On 5 July 2020, a 59-year-old male bus driver in Bayonne was left brain dead after being attacked by passengers who refused to pay for tickets and to wear face masks on his bus. Five people were arrested; two men were charged with attempted murder, two others with non-assistance to a person in danger and a fifth with attempting to hide a suspect. The driver died on 10 July, five days after the attack.

== Shortage of masks controversy ==
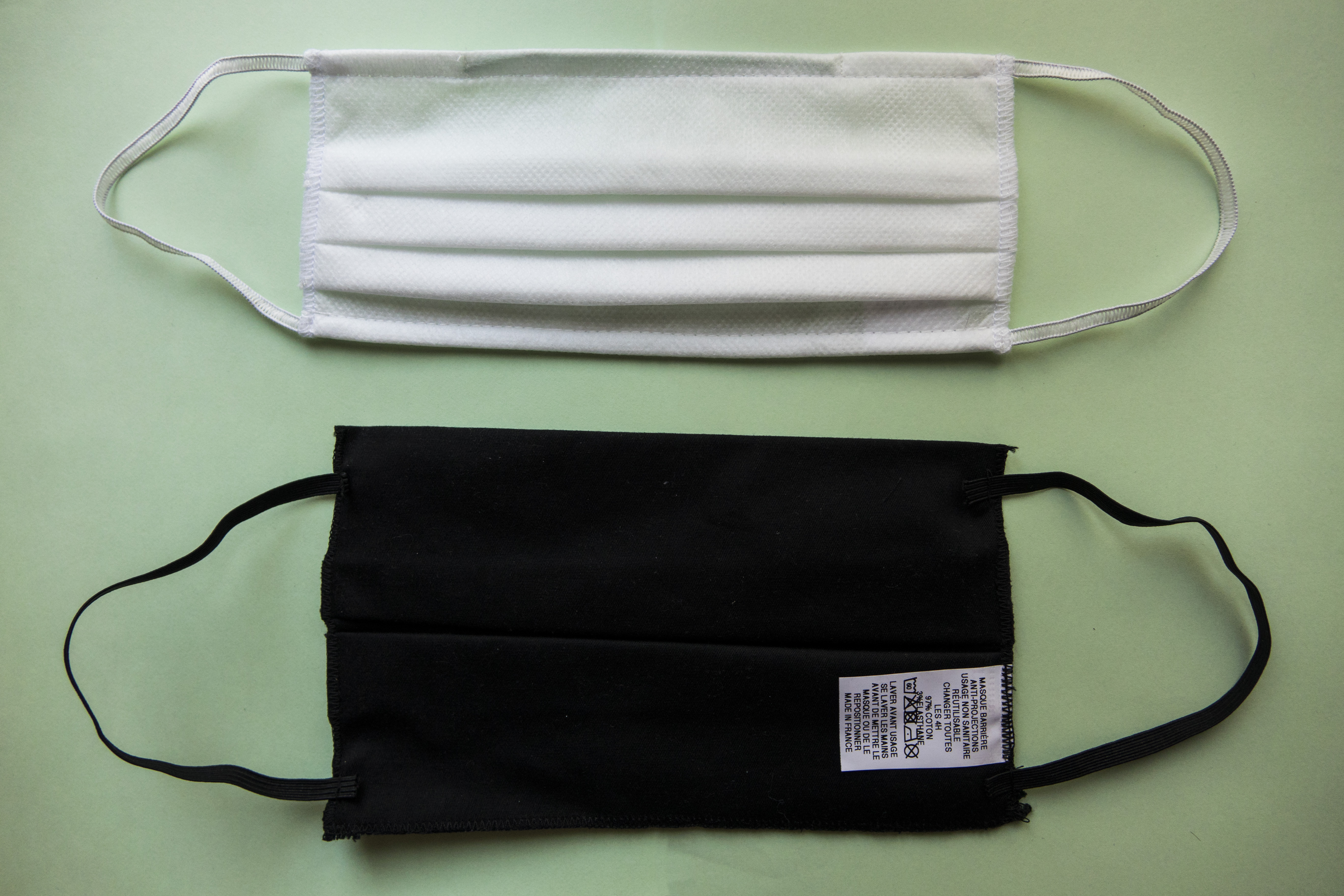
Cloth face masks certified by AFNOR. The white mask is made of polypropylene and the black one is made of cotton.

Strategic stocks of masks in 2009 under Roselyne Bachelot, minister of health from May 2007 to November 2010, amounted to 1 billion surgical masks and 600 million FFP2 masks. According to the French government, a change of doctrine had occurred upon recommendations from the General Health Directorate in July 2011, the decision was taken then to allow depletion of strategic stocks on the grounds of cost of maintaining the stockpile – including arbitrating the cost of obsolescence. Stock of surgical masks and FFP2 masks in late 2019 had dropped to 140 million and zero units respectively.

Then-health minister Agnès Buzyn declared on 26 January that there would be no shortage of masks in France during the outbreak. Later on 26 February, Jérôme Salomon, the French Directeur général de la Santé, declared during a debate by the French Senate that "A mask shortage is not a subject". However, health professionals complained that they were ill-equipped to face the crisis, due to inadequate stocks of protective equipment. On 3 March, with France still facing a shortage, President Macron commandeered all masks produced and stored in the country for distribution to health professionals and people who had contracted the virus.

France was subsequently accused of seizing medical equipment intended for other nations. On 5 March 2020, French authorities confiscated four million masks from the Swedish health care company Mölnlycke, which were in a distribution centre in Lyon and destined for Spain and Italy. Two weeks later, after pressure from the Swedish government, France released the masks, allowing two million of them through, with the rest remaining in France either to be used there or for re-export. Mölnlycke estimated that a total of "six million masks were seized by the French. All had been contracted for, including a million masks each for France, Italy and Spain. The rest were destined for Belgium, the Netherlands, Portugal and Switzerland."

On 27 April 2020, it was revealed by Libération that, contrary to government claims in March, a change of doctrine was not the main cause of the mask shortage, and that the government had been fully informed as early as 2018 that strategic reserves were depleted.

On 8 May 2020, the government announced that 200 million masks per week would be available starting on 11 May: 100 million for medical workers and 100 million for the general public.

== Hydroxychloroquine controversy ==
On 17 March 2020, Didier Raoult of the Mediterranean infectious and tropical disease institute in Marseille and member of the scientific council advising the government announced in a YouTube video entitled "Coronavirus: endgame!" that a trial by his team involving 24 patients supported the claim that hydroxychloroquine and azithromycin were effective in treating COVID-19. The design of the study as well as its conclusions are controversial and generally viewed as flawed and inconclusive. Raoult has nevertheless offered testing of those with symptoms at his institute and prescribed hydroxychloroquine for those who tested positive. The French Health Minister, Olivier Véran, announced that "new tests will now go ahead to evaluate the results of Raoult, to independently replicate the trials and ensure the findings are scientifically robust, before any possible decision might be made to roll any treatment out to the wider public".

On 30 March 2020, hospitals reported that there had been two dozen cases with three deaths of individuals who were suspected of self-medication with Plaquenil – a brand name for hydroxychloroquine. Drug safety agency (ANSM) warned against potentially fatal side effects, notably cardiac arrhythmia and heart attack. The agency banned its use, even with prescriptions, outside of hospitals, and in clinical trials, while stepping up its surveillance.

Raoult later resigned from the committee, and defended chloroquine as a drug that has been safely used for 80 years.

On 3 December 2021, the Order of Physicians in France gave Raoult a blame for promoting hydroxychloroquine "without scientific data".

== Chinese Embassy article ==
In mid-April 2020, the Chinese embassy published an online article entitled "Restoring distorted facts – Observations of a Chinese diplomat posted to Paris", which criticised western countries' slow response and accused workers at nursing homes in France of "abandoning their posts overnight ... and leaving their residents to die of hunger and disease". French Foreign Minister Jean-Yves Le Drian summoned the Chinese ambassador, and said that the remarks were not in line with the "quality of the bilateral relationship" between France and China.

== Cooperation with neighbouring states ==
On 29 February 2020, Monaco announced the first COVID-19 case, a man who was admitted to the Princess Grace Hospital Centre, then transferred to Nice University Hospital in France. Also on 29 February 2020, three French nationals and one Italian resident of Ain were being hospitalised in Lausanne or other places in Switzerland.

On 22 March 2020, Switzerland announced that three hospitals near the Alsace region had agreed to take in any French-based patients after Alsace officials made a request for assistance. Patients from Grand Est were also taken into hospitals in Baden-Württemberg, Rhineland-Palatinate, Saarland, and Hesse in Germany.

Up to 1 April 2020 over 100 COVID-19 patients from Alsace had been transferred for treatment to Germany, Luxembourg, and Switzerland.

== Statistics ==
(Source: official daily statistics from Minister of Health)

=== Graphs ===
==== Cumulative number of cases ====
View source data.

==== New cases per day ====
View source data.

==== Cumulative number of deaths ====
View source data.

==== Deaths per day ====
View source data.

==== Deaths in hospitals per day ====
Deaths from retirement homes (EHPAD) and assisted living facilities March to June 2020.

View source data.

==== Number of cases in ICU ====
View source data.

==== Death excess by place of death ====
View source data.

=== Location statistics ===
==== Death excess by town density ====
View source data.
View source data.

==== Death by administrative region ====
In addition to the Petite Couronne, cases have been detected in the following departments: Gironde, Haute-Savoie, Bas-Rhin, Val-d'Oise, Hérault, Finistère, Lyon Metropolis, Côte-d'Or, Alpes-Maritimes, Seine-Maritime, Loire-Atlantique, Ain, Landes, Charente-Maritime, Mayenne, Ille-et-Vilaine, Morbihan, Haut-Rhin, Eure, Sarthe, Gard, Drôme, Saône-et-Loire, all the departments of the region Hauts-de-France, except the Nord, and in the overseas territories of Saint Barthélemy and Saint Martin.

=== Simulation statistics ===
Simulation studies helped convince the government that taking no action would result in large numbers of civilian casualties. In such a case between 30,000 and 100,000 more ICU beds would be required in the hospitals. In France there are 5,000 reanimation service beds and 7,364 ICU beds. These simulations were provided by Neil Ferguson, epidemiologist at the Imperial College London.

== See also ==
- COVID-19 pandemic by country
- COVID-19 pandemic in Europe
- COVID-19 recession
