= Wiencek =

Wiencek is a surname. Notable people with the surname include:

- Henry Wiencek (born 1952), American journalist, historian and editor
- Patrick Wiencek (born 1989), German handballer
- Tami Wiencek (born 1969), American politician
- Winfried Wiencek (1949–2025), German deaf table tennis player
