= Christian Open Door Church =

Coordinates: 47.7702°N 7.3266°E

Église Porte Ouverte Chrétienne
- Église Porte Ouverte Chrétienne
- Location: Mulhouse
- Country: France
- Denomination: Evangelicalism, charismatic
- Website: porte-ouverte.com

History
- Founded: 1966
- Founder: Jean Peterschmitt

The Christian Open Door Church (Mission du Plein Évangile – Église Porte Ouverte Chrétienne [POC]) is a charismatic evangelical multi-site megachurch whose main place of worship is located in Mulhouse. It is the second largest Evangelical church in France, with over 2,200 people. The church is a member of the Federation of Full Gospel Churches in Francophonie and the National Council of Evangelicals of France. The senior pastor is Samuel Peterschmitt.

== History ==
The church was officially founded by Suzanne and Jean Peterschmitt in Mulhouse in 1966. This assembly was registered under its current name as cultural charitable organization. In 1972, the church had between 60 and 80 members.

In 1987, Samuel Peterschmitt succeeded his father as senior pastor of the church. This same year, the premises were relocated to a former supermarket in Mulhouse, with a capacity of 600 seats.

In 1989, the church established its new premises in a former supermarket with a capacity of 1,500 seats.

In 1995, the sanctuary was enlarged to provide 1,900 seats.

In 2005, 1,500 people were regularly attending the church.

By 2010, about 4,000 people were watching the church's broadcast of worship on the church's official site. Worships are broadcast by satellite in 37 countries and in Internet.

In 2015, the church had expansion work done in its building to create a capacity of 2,500 seats.

In 2017, the attendance had reached 2,200 people.

In 2023, it had opened 8 campus in different cities in France, Switzerland and Bulgaria.

== Beliefs ==
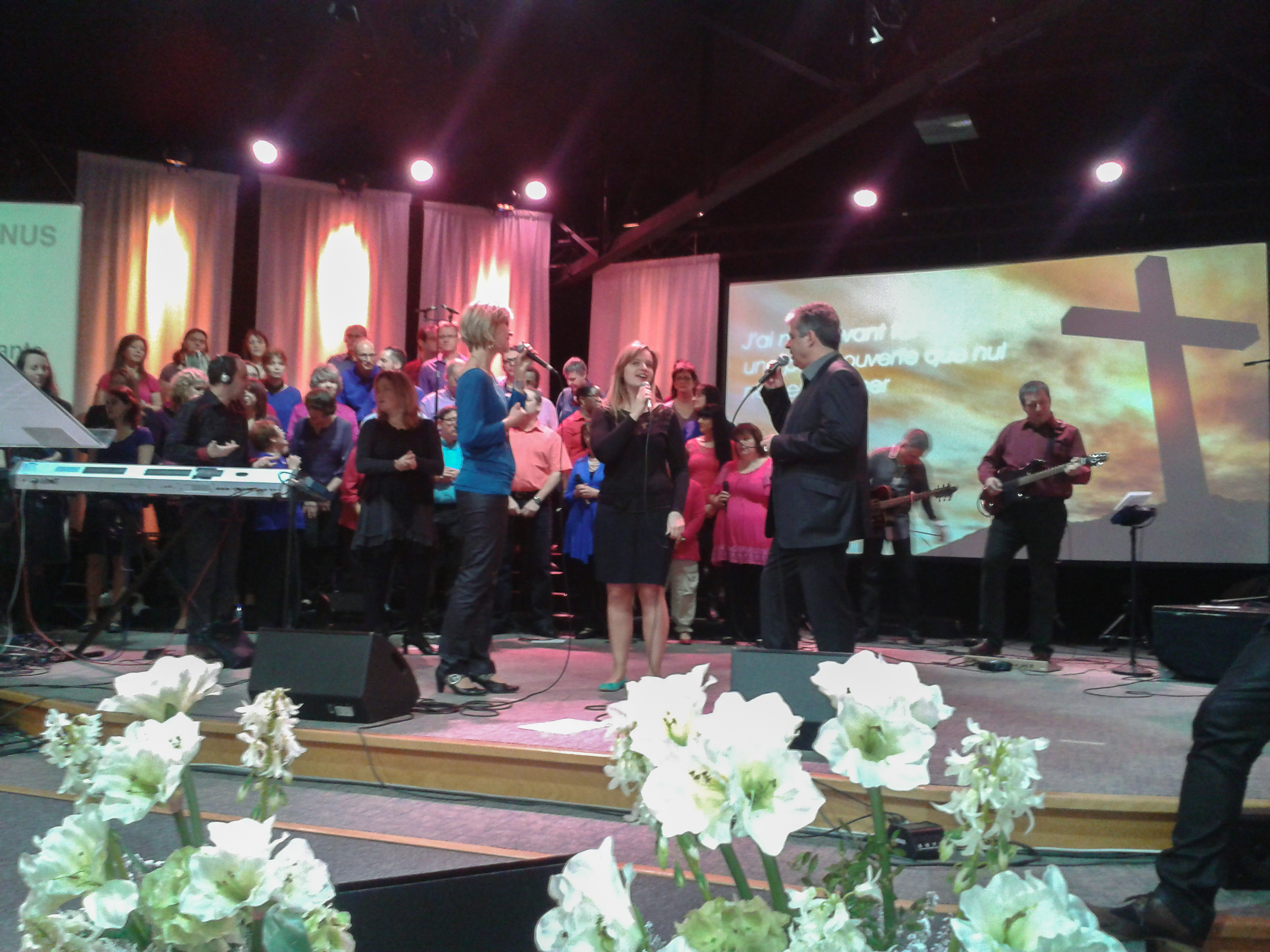
The church choir and its pastor, Samuel Peterschmitt.

The beliefs of the church are shared with that of the Federation of Full Gospel Churches in Francophonie, an evangelical charismatic association.

== Social programs ==
The church is involved in the city with humanitarian aid and, in this, is recognized by the town hall; the church also provides school support, clothing donation and administrative assistance.

== Philadelphia ==
In 1999, the church created the Philadelphia Cultural Association (Association Culturelle Philadelphie) which sells many books, DVD and CD.

== Controversies ==
In the 1990s, the church was criticized by former members, their families, anti-cult associations and by the Catholic Church. In 1993, the group "Religious Evolution and New Spiritualities" ("Évolution Religieuses et Nouvelles Spiritualités"), led by the Catholic Church, added to the criticisms. Then, in 1996, the anti-cult association CCMM, received the first complaints from former members. In 1999, Claude Omnibus, the husband of a deceased follower, accused the movement of having killed his wife after her refusal of an organ transplant, and created an association of victims named Association of Victims of the Christian Open Door (Association des Victimes de la Porte Ouverte Chrétienne, AVIPOC). He participated in many television programs to warn against the COD, and was supported by the ADFI and CCMM, two anti-cult associations (the CCMM asked the Mission interministérielle de vigilance et de lutte contre les dérives sectaires to add the COD in the 1995 list of cults). The COD was described as "a dangerous cult" in a book by two journalists and in many press articles. Activities of the group that are criticized include anti-social speech, family breakdowns, false promises of healing which led to abandonment of medical treatments, theological deviances and financial disclosures. Meanwhile, the COD sought support from French Evangelical Association (Association Évangélique Française [AEF]) and unsuccessfully tried to integrate the Protestant Federation of France.

Pastor Peterschmitt and members denied these accusations when they were interviewed in the media. The pastor said his church was a victim of religious discrimination.

Two sociologists who studied this church in 2002 rejected these criticisms and said in their conclusion that any group might experience deviances.

== COVID-19 ==
A gathering organised by the church in mid-February 2020 in Mulhouse and attended by about 2,000 faithful became a significant event in the spread of the COVID-19 pandemic across France. On 3 March, seven local participants had tested positive for the virus; five returnees from the Mulhouse event were confirmed positive in French Guiana on 4 March. On 5 March a retired couple from Lot-et-Garonne and another person from Deux-Sèvres who had attended the same gathering were declared positive for the disease; five new cases from this cluster were registered in Corsica, and three more in Normandy the same day.

On 6 March, it was announced that 81 cases had been detected in the previous 24 hours in Mulhouse. The department of Haut Rhin, in which Mulhouse is situated, imposed strict limits on the gatherings; all schools were closed henceforth. Physical church services were suspended in favour of internet worship.

During the spring of 2020, the church received blame for the spread of the virus in France, and its pastor and other members reported receiving threats. However, a May 2020 study by a doctor at the Albert-Schweitzer hospital in Colmar suggested that the impact of the church meeting had been overstated, reporting that the virus had been present in the region since November 2019, and that the Church was "only one link in the chain of virus transmission".

== See also ==
- List of the largest evangelical churches
- List of the largest evangelical church auditoriums

== Sources ==
- Willaime, Jean-Paul; Amiotte-Suchet, Laurent (October 2004). "" La pluie de l'Esprit " — Étude sociologique d'une assemblée pentecôtiste mulhousienne: " Mission du Plein Évangile. La Porte Ouverte Chrétienne "" (PDF) (in French). Groupe de Sociologie des Religions et de la Laïcité.
