= Jérôme Salomon =

French physician and official

Directeur général de la Santé
- Incumbent
- Assumed office 8 January 2018
- President: Emmanuel Macron
- Prime Minister: Jean Castex
- Preceded by: Benoît Vallet

Personal details
- Born: 26 April 1969 (age 57) Paris, France
- Education: University of Paris

Jérôme Salomon (French pronunciation: [ʒeʁom salɔmɔ̃]; born 4 April 1969) is a French infectious diseases physician and high-ranking civil servant. He is the French Directeur général de la Santé since 8 January 2018. He became known in France since the COVID-19 pandemic.

== Medical career ==
He worked on Emerging infectious diseases, Epidemics and Antimicrobial resistance at Inserm, Pasteur Institute, and Versailles Saint-Quentin-en-Yvelines University. He was clinic director at the Raymond Poincaré University Hospital from 1999 to 2002, then physician from 2004 to 2009.

== Public service career ==
He was a counselor of Bernard Kouchner at the beginning of the 2000 years. In 2010, he became health expert in the Marisol Touraine (then Social Affairs and Health) cabinet, then counselor from 2013 to 2015.

In 2016, he rallied the then beginning Macron's campaign for the 2017 French presidential election and participated in the redaction of the health part of the candidate program.

In January 2018, he was chosen by Agnès Buzyn to become Directeur général de la Santé.

=== Coronavirus pandemic ===
Jérôme Salomon became known in France since the COVID-19 pandemic, making daily statements about the daily trend analysis and situation within the country, the status of those diagnosed. It was said in March 2020 that his position was very difficult because he warned Emmanuel Macron as soon as 2016 that France was unprepared about the consequences of a possible pandemic but now was required to justify the current French government actions.
