= Department of General Services =

Department of General Services can refer to agencies of various governments:

== United States ==
- California Department of General Services
- Pennsylvania Department of General Services
