= Fédération Française du Bâtiment =

The Fédération Française du Bâtiment (FFB) represents 57,000 companies as well as approximately two thirds of the French building industry’s turnover and salaried staff. It was founded in 1904 by the merger of several regional organisations.

== Goals ==
The goals of the FFB are to:

- Reduce constraints which hinder the building industry
- Stimulate social policy within the building industry, in particular with regards to prevention and safety
- Enhance the profession’s image
- Recapture the domestic market
- Develop public procurement and encourage local authorities to invest

== Overview ==
The FFB is a network made up of 96 local federations, 27 regional federations and 30 trade unions. It actively promotes the restoration and preservation of buildings. Also, the FFB promotes sustainable construction.

- To improve the environment and the built-up landscape
- To enhance well-being inside buildings
- To have better control of the use of raw materials
- To save energy and to reduce pollution
- To offer a better approach of water use and quality
- To pay attention to quality and safety on building sites
