= Winfried Wiencek =

German sports official and table tennis player (1949–2025)

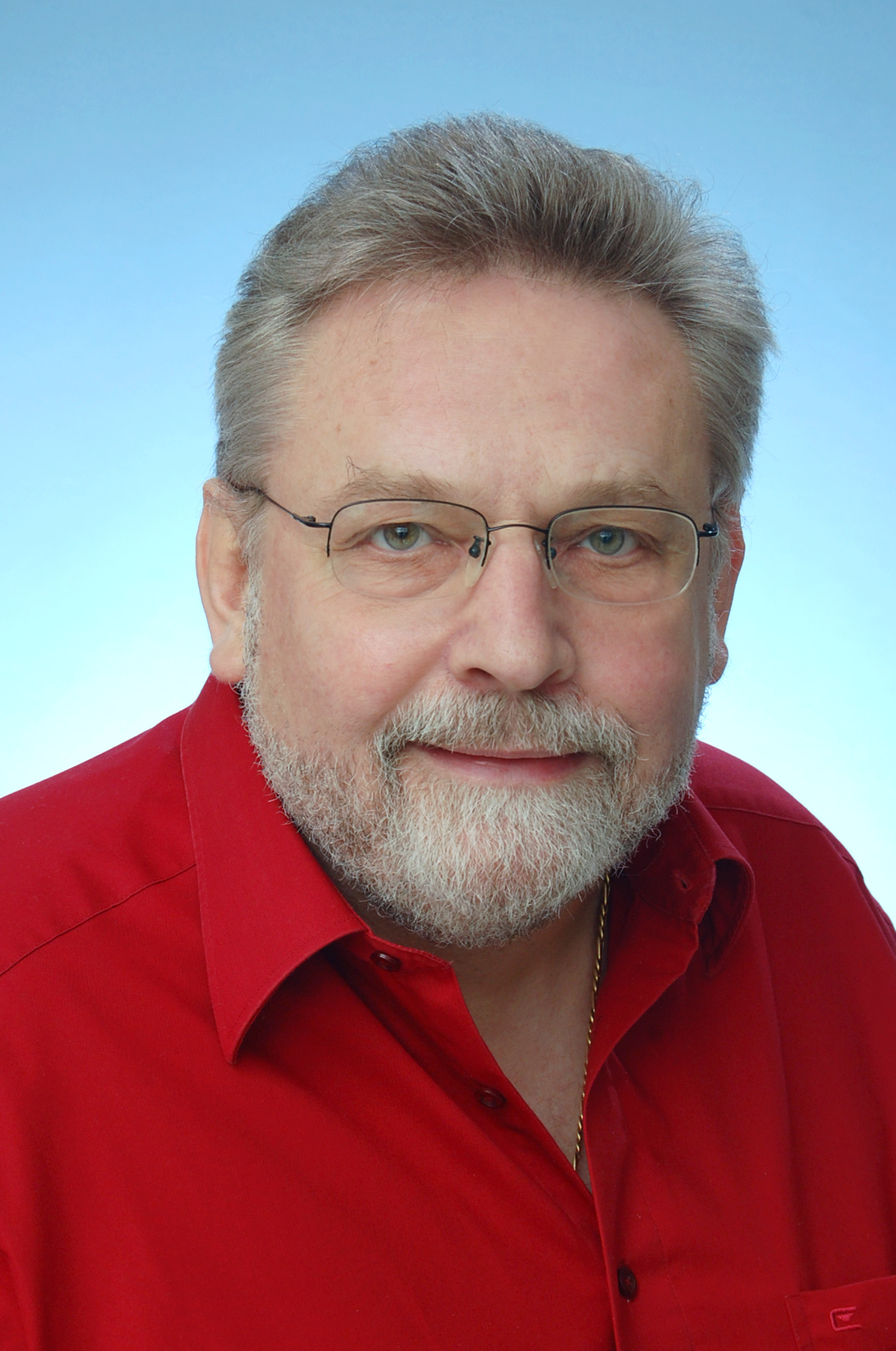
Wiencek in 2009

Winfried Wiencek (2 January 1949 – 10 January 2025) was a deaf sports official and German deaf table tennis player. Since 2003 he was General Secretary of the German Deaf Sports Association. He was president of the Deaf Sports Association North Rhine-Westphalia (German: Gehörlosen-Sportverband Nordrhein-Westfalen e.V.), and a recipient of the Order of Merit of the Federal Republic of Germany.

== Career ==
Wiencek was born in Sengwarden. He won 19 German titles and 36 NRW-Championship titles. He was a national player, coach at four European Championships and four World Games for the Deaf. He became involved with his club, Dortmund GTSV as a sportsman, youth officer, managing director and 1st chairman.

In 2006 he became president of Deaf Sports Association North Rhine-Westphalia, after serving as youth officer, chief cashier, assessor and 2nd chairman.

At the German Deaf Sports Association, he was a youth secretary, association special warden for table tennis and board member. He was the technical director for table tennis at the European Deaf Sports Association (EDSO) and the International Committee of Sports for the Deaf (ICSD).

== Athlete ==
- German deaf champion table-tennis team (11): 1975–79, 1981–1984, 1994, 1997
- German deaf champion table tennis junior double: 1968
- German deaf champion table tennis junior mixed: 1970
- German deaf champion table tennis seniors double (2): 1989, 1991
- German deaf champion table tennis senior mixed: 1993
- NRW deaf champion table tennis singles (3): 1972–73, 1975
- NRW deaf champion table-tennis team (20): 1971–75, 1977–79, 1981–1982, 1985–89,1991–92, 1995, 1998-99
- NRW deaf champion table tennis doubles (10): 1972–75, 1977, 1979, 1981, 1986–1988,
- NRW deaf table Tennis Team Cup Winners (3): 1991, 1992, 1996
- TT-deaf national team (6): 1975-1980

== Volunteer ==
- 2006–Present President of Deaf Sports Association NRW
- 2002 - 2006 associate judge in Deaf Sports Association NRW
- 1998 - 2002 2nd Chairman of the Deaf Sports Association North Rhine-Westphalia (NRW)
- 1995 - 2003 assessors in the presidium of the German Deaf Sports Association
- 1993 - 2003 technical director for table tennis in the EDSO (European Deaf Sports Association)
- 1991 - 2001 technical director for table tennis in the CISS (Comité International des Sports des Sourds)
- 1990 - 1998 associate judge in Deaf Sports Association North Rhine-Westphalia
- 1988 - 1996 1st chairman deaf gymnastics and sports club Dortmund
- 1984 - 1986 Managing Director of Deaf Sports and Gymnastics Club Dortmund
- 1982 - 1986 treasurer in Deaf Sports Association of North Rhine-Westphalia
- 1975 - 2002 association special warden TT in German Deaf Sports Association
- 1974 - 1978 youth secretary of the German Deaf Sports Association
- 1974 - 1976 youth officer deaf gymnastics and sports club Dortmund
- 1971 - 1974 sports director deaf gymnastics and sports club Dortmund
- 1970 - 1971 1st chairman deaf gymnastics and sports club Dortmund

== Other ==
- 2013 Sofia: Deputy head of mission at the 2013 Summer Deaflympics
- 2009 Taipei: Deputy head of mission at the 2009 Summer Deaflympics
- 1991 Sofia: Supervisor of the German national team at the European Championship TT
- 1989 Christchurch: Supervisor of the German deaf TT national team at World Games of the Deaf
- 1987 Budapest: Supervisor of the German national team at the European Championship TT
- 1985 Los Angeles: Supervisor of the German deaf TT national team at the World Games for the Deaf
- 1983 Copenhagen: Supervisor of the German deaf TT team at the European Championships
- 1981 Cologne: Supervisor of the German deaf TT national team at the World Games for the Deaf
- 1979 Brussels: Supervisor of the German deaf TT team at the European Championships
- 1977 Bucharest: Participate as athletes in table tennis at the World Games for the Deaf

== Awards ==
| Year | Award | Labeller |
|---|---|---|
| 2010 | Order of Merrit | Federal Republic of Germany |
| 2008 | Silver badge of honour | Deaf Sports Association of North Rhine-Westphalia |
| 2006 | Sport badge | State North Rhine-Westfalia |
| 2000 | Golden badge of honour | German Deaf Sports Association |
| 1994 | Silver badge of honour | Urban Sports Association Dortmund |
| 1992 | Silver badge of honour | German Deaf Sports Association |
| 1982 | Bronze badge of honour | German Deaf Sports Association |

== See also ==
- Deutscher Gehörlosen-Sportverband
- Deaflympics
