= Deutscher Gehörlosen-Sportverband =

German umbrella organization for sport of deaf people

- Abbreviation: DGS
- Formation: 1910
- Headquarters: Essen
- Location: Germany
- President: Norbert Hensen
- Website: dg-sv.de

Deutscher Gehörlosen Sportverband (DGS) is the German umbrella organization for sport for deaf and people with hearing impairments. The DGS is a registered organization based in Essen.

== History ==
In the mid-19th century, a group of gymnasts, bowlers and chess players met to form teams. With the establishment of the "Taubstummen Turnvereinigung Berlin" (Berlin Deaf Gymnastics Association) on 18 October 1888, the foundation was laid for the organization of deaf athletes. The group added women's and children's divisions in 1896.

A key figure in the development of the Taubstummen Turnvereinigung was Albert Gutzmann, the first director of a school for the deaf-mute in Germany.

Other teams followed the lead of the Taubstummen, and established associations throughout Germany.

Throughout the early 20th century (interrupted only by the outbreak of World War I, which brought much of Germany's amateur athletic pursuits to a standstill), the various deaf athletic associations grew and merged, resulting in the culmination: the formation of the DGS in Hanover in 1946.

== Goals ==
- Development, maintenance and further development of deaf sports, especially youth sports
- To represent deaf sports at home and abroad, whether to individuals, clubs, associations, or governments, and all related matters to the common benefit of all members, shall be based on the sporting spirit
- Make sure that deaf sports are held within the Federal Republic of Germany in accordance with national and international regulations
- Training of trainers and coaches, and the promotion of sports courses and the introduction of measures of general education and youth sport nursing kind
- Competitions in the respective sports in DGS operated German deaf champion to be determined in national cup competitions the winner to set up the necessary arrangements for this purpose as part of his orders to carry out further international matches and the necessary preparation for their games and training sessions

== Past presidents ==
1910–1914:	Hermann Hauboldt
1914–1924:	Hermann Zech
1924–1933:	Hermann Hauboldt
1946–1974:	Heinrich Siepmann
1974–1991:	Friedrich Waldow
1991–2003:	Hubert Wilhelm
2003–2013:	Karl-Werner Broska

== Honorary members ==
- Theo Krumscheid (†)
- Harry Förster (†)
- Käthi George

== Sponsors, partners and supporters ==
=== Sponsors ===
- Federal Ministry of the Interior (Germany)
- German sports aid foundation

=== Partners ===
==== General partners ====
- Volkswagen Group
- powerone
- Verband der Deutschen Automatenindustrie (VDAI, Federation of German vending industry)
- Mundipharma GmbH

==== Media partners ====
- German deaf newspaper
- Life in sight
- German cochlear implant Society
- Schnecke-online.de

=== Supporter ===
- Reha Com Tech
- SnowTrex

== See also ==
- Deaflympics
- Deaf people in the Olympics
