= Direction générale de la Santé =

Governmental organization overview
- Formed: 1956
- Governmental organization executive: Jérôme Salomon
- Website: lannuaire.service-public.fr/gouvernement

The Direction générale de la Santé (DGS) is one of the Directorates-General of the French Ministry of Health.

It was created in 1956 through the merger of the Direction de l’hygiène publique and Direction de l’Hygiène sociale.

== Mission ==
Its mission is to develop public health policy and contribute to its implementation.
